= Culture of Los Angeles =

The culture of Los Angeles is ethnically diverse and rich with arts. In the 1920s and 1930s, Will and Ariel Durant, Arnold Schoenberg, the city's actors and filmmakers, and others were representatives of culture. As the city flourished financially in the middle of the 20th century, boosters such as Dorothy Buffum Chandler raised funds for the establishment of art museums, music centers, and theaters.

Los Angeles is strongly influenced by Mexican American culture due to California formerly being part of Mexico and, previously, the Spanish Empire.

== Architecture ==
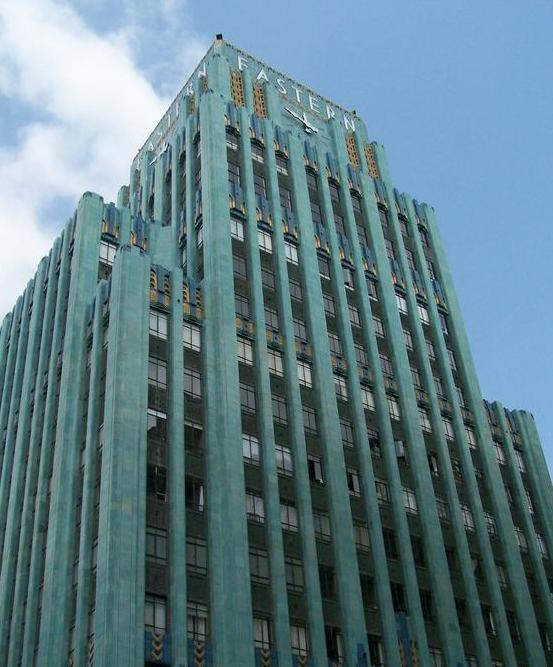
Eastern Columbia Building, a well known Art Deco building in downtown Los Angeles

Los Angeles features many different architectural styles and has a rich and diverse history of architectural works. The city has been known throughout professional architectural circles as a testbed for architecture. The case study houses in particular revolutionized residential architecture, as did many of the city's theaters. Architectural styles throughout the city include Mission Revival, Mayan Revival, various forms of European Revival, Spanish Colonial Revival, American Craftsman, Arts and Crafts, Art Deco, International Style, Mid Century Modern, Googie, Neo-futurism, Deconstructivism, and Programmatic.

In 1878, Robert Brown Young was one of two architects residing in the city, the other was Ezra F. Kysor. At one point, Young had 87 different buildings under construction, and Kysor was responsible for many of the city's first and oldest buildings as well. Los Angeles's most renowned late 19th/early 20th century architects include Sumner Hunt, the Tifal brothers, Train and Williams, Abram M. Edelman, Samuel Tilden Norton, Morgan, Walls and Morgan, and John B. Parkinson. The city's most renowned architects the 1920s and 1930s include Albert C. Martin Sr., Walker & Eisen, John C. Austin, Parkinson & Parkinson, Curlett & Beelman, and Morgan, Walls & Clements, and the city's most notable theater architects during these decades include S. Charles Lee, B. Marcus Priteca, G. Albert Lansburgh, Lewis Arthur Smith, and William Lee Woollett. Mid century architects with important works in the city include Richard Neutra, Jack A. Charney, Pereira & Luckman, Paul R. Williams, Pierre Koenig, John Lautner, and Welton Becket, and notable modern architects include Frank Gehry, Richard Meier, Thom Mayne, Rafael Moneo, and Ma Yansong. Frank Lloyd Wright designed numerous buildings in Los Angeles as well.

== Cinema and television ==
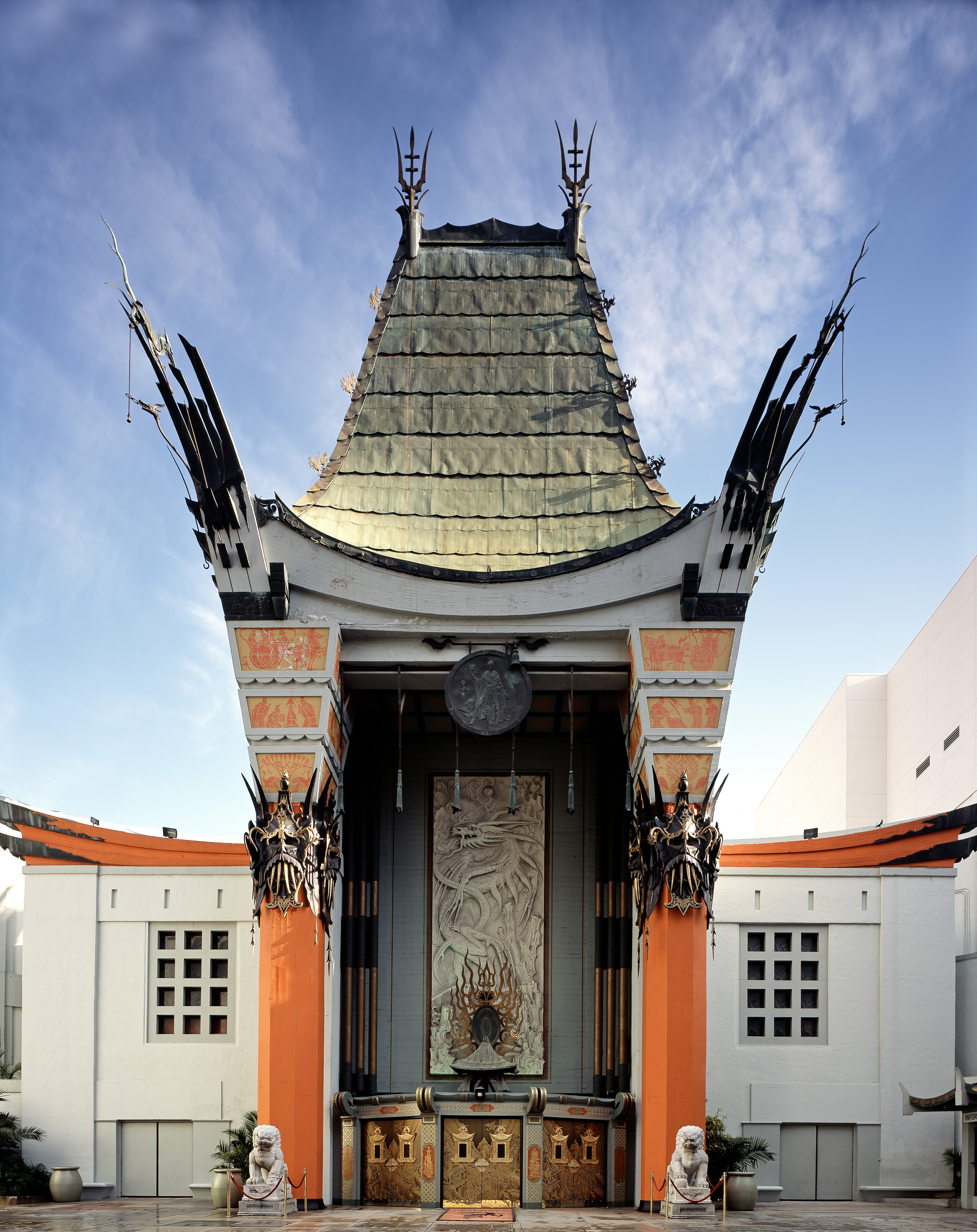
Grauman's Chinese Theatre

The greater Los Angeles area is the most important site in the United States for movie and television production. The area's motion picture and television industries have helped create the image that defines Los Angeles across the world. Many tourists visit film-related landmarks such as the Walk of Fame and the Hollywood Sign.

Hollywood, a neighborhood in the central region of Los Angeles, is notable as the home of the United States film industry and its name has come to be a shorthand reference for the industry and the people in it. Every major United States film studio was located in Hollywood and all are still located in the Los Angeles area. Los Angeles is also home to many important film-related organizations, including the Academy of Motion Picture Arts and Sciences, Academy of Television Arts & Sciences, American Cinematheque, Film Independent, and numerous filmmaking unions.

Los Angeles is home to many film festivals, including AFIfest, Los Angeles Film Festival, Screamfest, Outfest, and Dances with Films. The city hosts the vast majority of the industry's premieres, and it contains numerous historic movie palaces, art theaters, and other specialty theaters, including the flagship theaters for both Netflix and Disney.

== Comedy ==
Many comedy clubs are located in the Los Angeles area. West Hollywood's Comedy Store and Laugh Factory are considered two of the most prestigious comedy clubs in the country; other notable clubs include The Ice House, Comedy Chateau, and Flappers.

Improv comedy clubs located in Los Angeles include Upright Citizens Brigade and a Second City Training Center. Additionally, iO West was located in Hollywood from 1997 to 2018.

Netflix Is A Joke is also occasionally held throughout Los Angeles.

== Cuisine ==
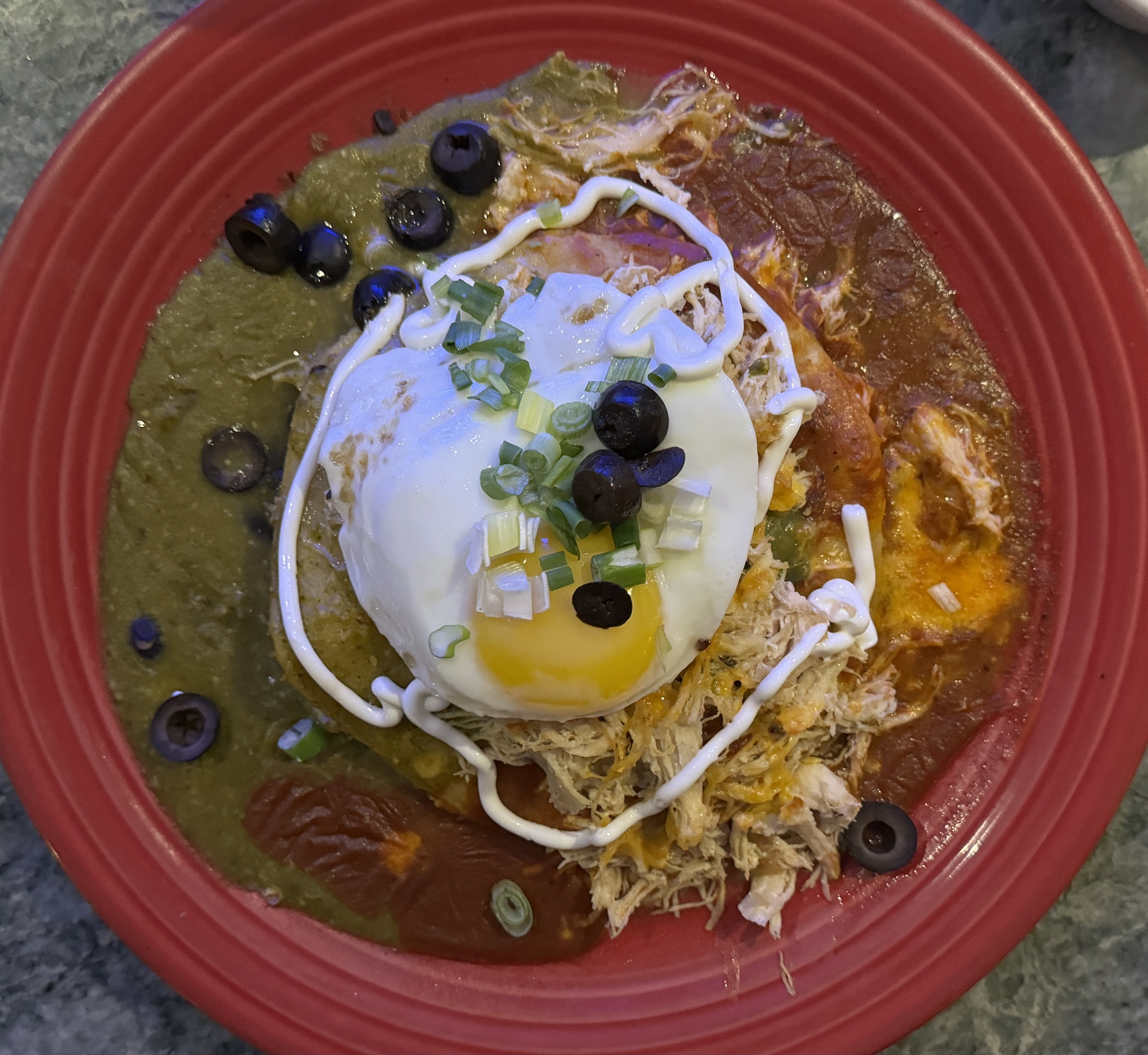
Sonora style enchiladas at El Cholo Spanish Cafe

According to Oxford Encyclopedia of Food and Drink in America, Los Angeles "remains the United States's preeminent city to eat regional Mexican food." The city of Glendale has among the highest concentration of Armenian restaurants in the country. In predominantly African American neighborhoods, soul food restaurants such as Dulan's Soul Food Kitchen, The Serving Spoon, Red's Flavor Table, Harold & Belle's, Alta Adams and Roscoe's House of Chicken and Waffles are popular. And given the area's constant flow of Asian immigrants, Asian food has a large foothold, with Japanese, Chinese, Vietnamese, Korean, Indian, and Thai restaurants extremely common. Asian inspired food festivals include 626 Night Market. Ventura Boulevard has the highest concentration of sushi restaurants outside Japan.

Many foods and food businesses started in Los Angeles. Fast food chains that started in the area include Fatburger, In-N-Out Burger, Carl's Jr., Tommy's, McDonald's, Hot Dog on a Stick, Wienerschnitzel, Taco Bell, Del Taco, Dave's Hot Chicken, Panda Express, Pick Up Stix, Yum-Yum Donuts, Winchell's, Wetzel's Pretzels and Coffee Bean and Tea Leaf; restaurants chains include IHOP, Norms Restaurants, Denny's, Bob's Big Boy, Cheesecake Factory, Pizza Studio, Blaze Pizza, and California Pizza Kitchen; ice cream/frozen yogurt shops include Baskin Robbins, Yogurtland, Menchie's, and Pinkberry. Many popular dishes were invented in Los Angeles, including the Cheeseburger, Chili burger, Pastrami burger, Cobb salad (Hollywood Brown Derby), Chinese chicken salad, California roll, French-Dip sandwich (either at Cole's Pacific Electric Buffet or Phillippe's), ice blended coffee (Coffee Bean & Tea Leaf), hot fudge sundae (C.C. Brown's), pizza bagel (Western Bagel), smoothie (Orange Julius) and Korean taco.

The city's dining scene includes a wide variety of options. DineLA Restaurant Week offers a sample of these restaurants twice a year. In 2018, PETA declared Los Angeles to be the "most vegan-friendly city" in the world.

== Literature ==
Los Angeles has a significant crime and noir history, which started with Raymond Chandler, whose hard-boiled detective stories were set in pre-war and immediate post-war Los Angeles, and was continued by Ross Macdonald into the 1950s, 1960s, and 1970s. Other local writers who've contributed to the genre include Walter Mosley, James Ellroy, Joseph Hansen, Eve Babitz, James Robert Baker, Michael Connelly, and Bret Easton Ellis. Outside noir, Nathanael West's The Day of the Locust depicts a raw side to Hollywood and Ray Bradbury wrote science fiction after moving to the city in 1934. In the 1960s, Joan Didion became one of Los Angeles's most acclaimed writers; her essay collections Slouching Towards Bethlehem (1968), The White Album (1979), and novel Play It as It Lays (1970) established her as one of the preeminent chroniclers of the city. John Fante is also considered one of the most important writers from Los Angeles; his novel Ask the Dust is widely considered the great Los Angeles novel. Other notable Los Angeles novelists include Janet Fitch, Viet Thanh Nguyen, Carolyn See, and Héctor Tobar.

Los Angeles's best known local poet was Charles Bukowski. Additionally, tens of thousands of screenplays have been written by Los Angeles residents. The movie business has also attracted many authors to the city, including F. Scott Fitzgerald, Aldous Huxley, Tennessee Williams, Evelyn Waugh, William Faulkner, and Joan Didion.

Los Angeles contains many independent bookstores, including The Last Bookstore, the largest bookstore in California and second largest on the West Coast, and Larry Edmunds Bookshop, considered by film critic Leonard Maltin to be "the best movie bookstore in the world." Los Angeles is also home to several literary magazine, including the Los Angeles Review of Books, Slake, The Santa Monica Review, and Black Clock. The Los Angeles Times Festival of Books, held annually, is the largest book festival in the world.

== Music ==
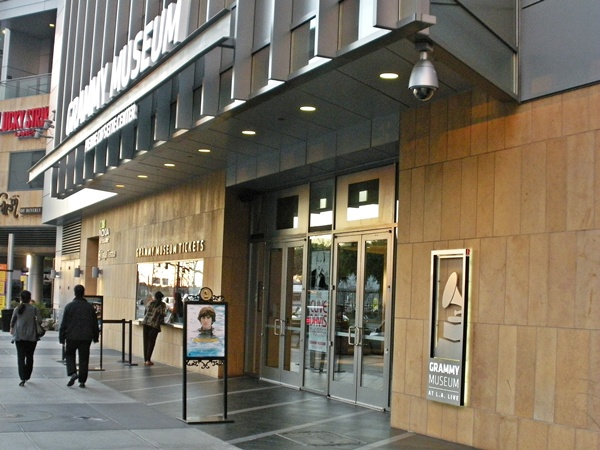
The entrance of the Grammy Museum

Los Angeles is one of the most important cities in the world for recorded and live music. The landmark Capitol Records building is located in Hollywood, A&M Records long occupied a studio off Sunset Boulevard, and the Warner Brothers built a major recording business in addition to their film business. Local Rhino Records began a reissue boom by repackaging old recordings for modern audiences. Notable music venues include the Hollywood Bowl, Greek Theatre, Ford Amphitheatre, Walt Disney Concert Hall, and rock venues such as the Roxy and Troubadour.

Los Angeles has a vibrant African-American music community. Historically, a number of musicians congregated around Central Avenue, and the community produced several great talents, including Charles Mingus, Buddy Collette, and Gerald Wilson. Later, the 1990s saw gangsta rap reestablish the Los Angeles area (particularly Long Beach and Compton) as a center of African-American music. Performers in this movement include N.W.A, Dr. Dre, Eazy-E, Ice Cube, 2Pac, and Snoop Dogg.

In the 1960s, the Sunset Strip became a discovery ground for bands like The Byrds, Buffalo Springfield, and The Doors. Numerous hard rock acts have come from the Los Angeles area, including Van Halen, Mötley Crüe, Guns N' Roses, Megadeth, Metallica, Jane's Addiction, Korn, The Offspring, and the Red Hot Chili Peppers. Softer rock acts also flourished, including the Eagles and Linda Ronstadt. The area was also home to a sizeable punk rock movement, and featured bands such as X, Black Flag, and Wasted Youth. In the 1980s, the Paisley Underground movement was native to Los Angeles. Los Angeles' contribution to rock continued in the 1990s and early 21st century with artists such as Beck, Tool, System of a Down, Rage Against the Machine, No Doubt, Linkin Park, Incubus, Deftones, AFI, and Thirty Seconds to Mars.

Los Angeles is also a large contributor to pop music. The area produced many of the 20th century's most popular performers, and in the 21st century, the area has produced The Black Eyed Peas, Justin Timberlake, Miley Cyrus, Selena Gomez, Demi Lovato, Katy Perry, Kesha, and Ariana Grande.

The Music Center of Los Angeles County, which consists of the Walt Disney Concert Hall, Dorothy Chandler Pavilion, Ahmanson Theatre, and Mark Taper Forum, is located in downtown Los Angeles. The Los Angeles Philharmonic Orchestra performs at Walt Disney Concert Hall and summer concerts at the Hollywood Bowl. Walt Disney Concert Hall is also home to the Los Angeles Master Chorale. Dorothy Chandler Pavilion is home to the Los Angeles Opera and Dance at the Music Center.

== Public art ==
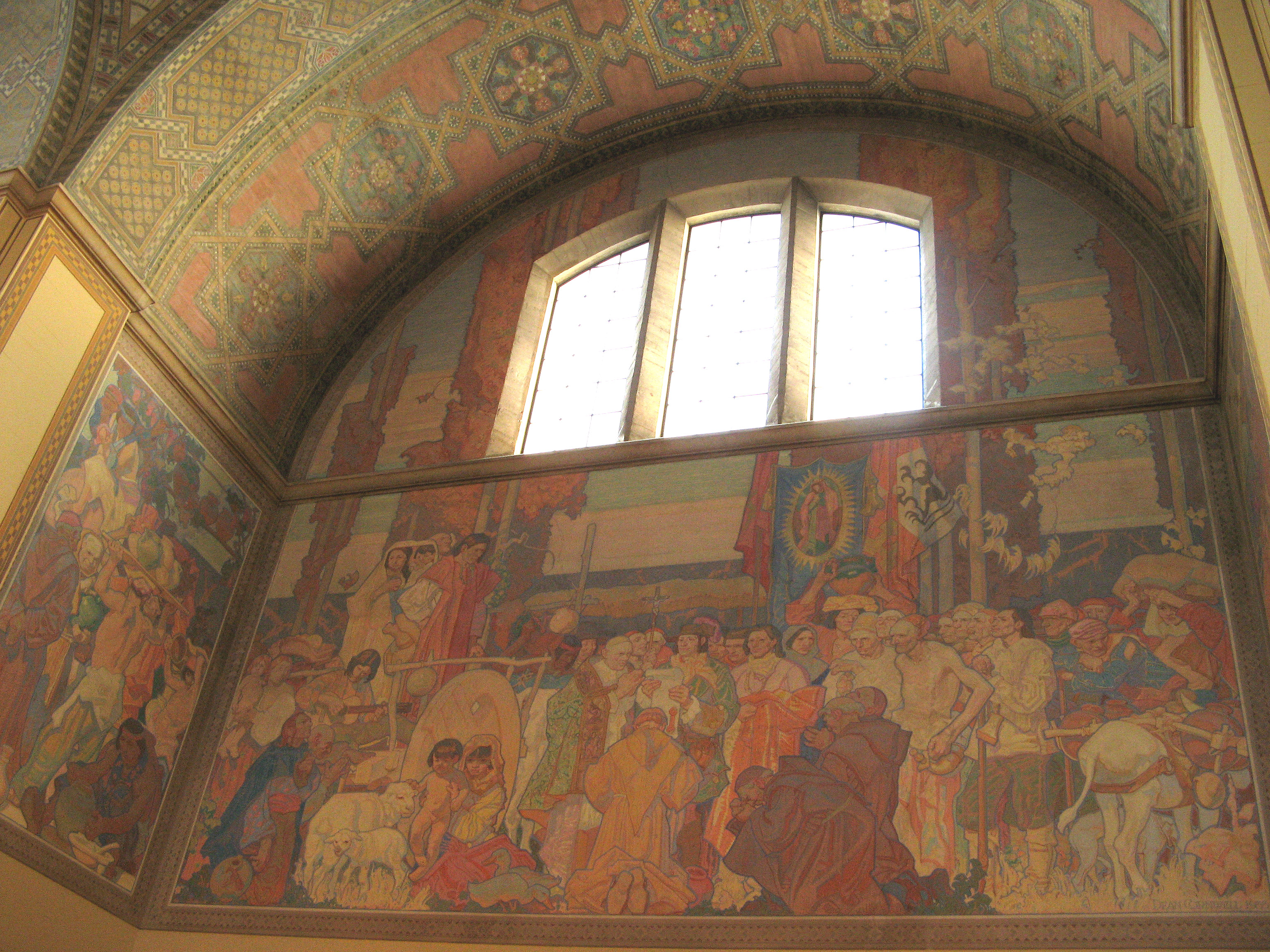
The Era of Discovery by Dean Cornwell in the Central Library rotunda

Los Angeles is known for its murals. Many were painted by Mexican muralists Diego Rivera, David Alfaro Siqueiros, and José Clemente Orozco. Central Library incorporates murals and sculptures throughout, notably four rotunda murals by Dean Cornwell. During the 1960s and 1970s, the Chicano art movement took hold in Los Angeles. Works produced in this era included those by East Los Streetscapers and Judy Baca. Chicano arts in Los Angeles also gave rise to Self Help Graphics & Art, known for its Corita Kent-influenced serigraphs and its annual Día de los Muertos festival.

During the 1970s, public art in downtown Los Angeles was characterized by large abstract sculptures such as Herbert Bayer's Double Ascension (1973), and Alexander Calder's Four Arches (1973). In 1989, the City passed an ordinance requiring developers to contribute one percent a building's construction cost to public art. The resulting funds created public art installations throughout the city.

The oldest known public artwork in Los Angeles is the 1900 sculpture of a soldier by S. M. Goddard and Kilpatrick; it is now part of the Spanish-American War Memorial located in Pershing Square. More recently, Chris Burden's Urban Light (2008), located at the Los Angeles County Museum of Art, has been featured in several films and is considered an iconic image of Los Angeles.

== Theater ==
Los Angeles has a thriving theater scene, primarily centered in downtown's Broadway Theatre District, the NoHo Arts District, and Hollywood Theatre Row. The Hollywood Pantages is the highest grossing live theater venue in the city; it mostly shows Broadway productions.

== Sports ==
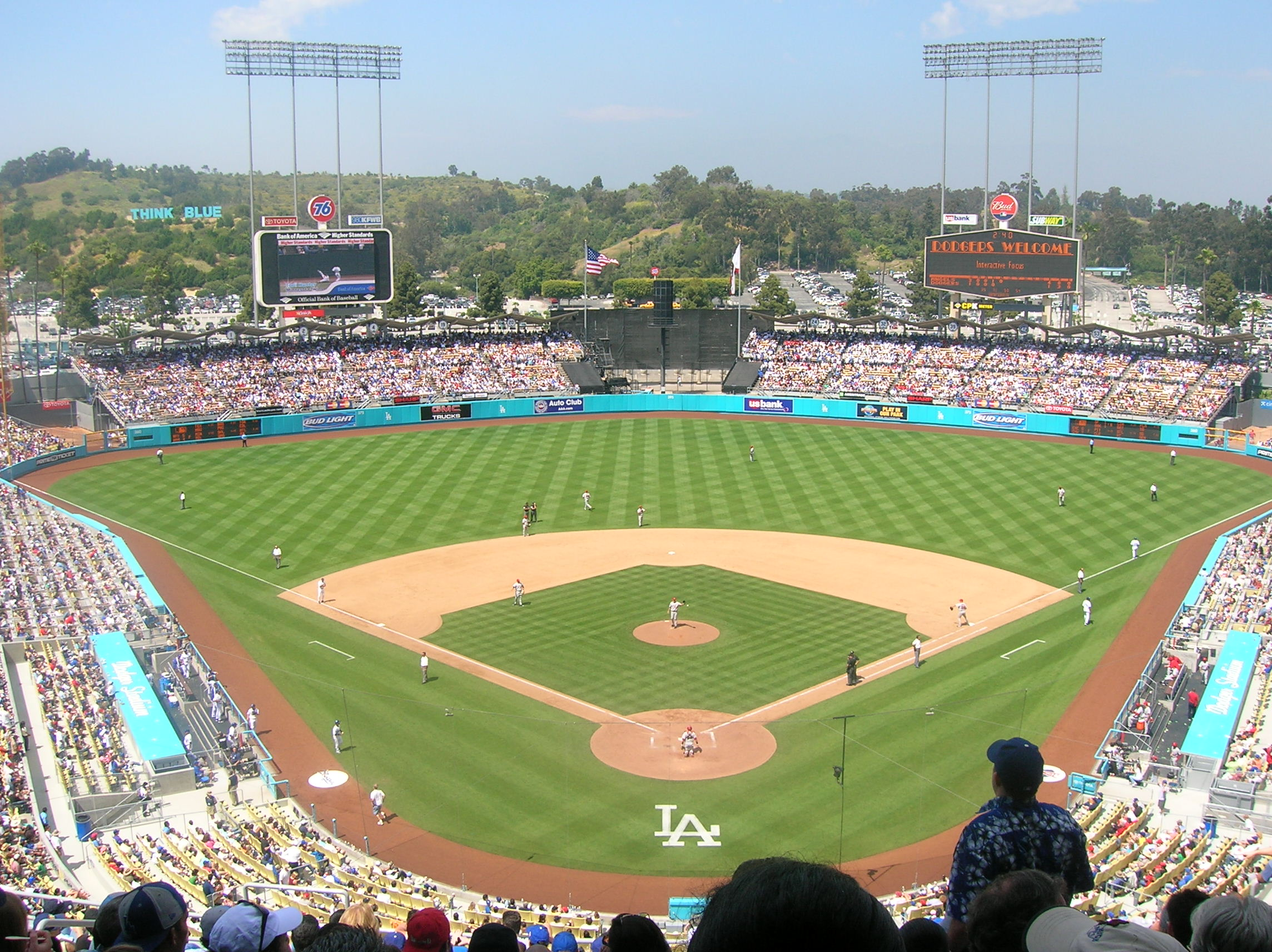
Dodger Stadium, home of the Los Angeles Dodgers

Unlike most of the United States, Los Angeles is not considered a football city. The city lacked a National Football League team from 1995 to 2015. Prior to 1995, it was home to the Rams and Raiders and post-2015 it has been home to the Rams and Chargers.

Baseball and basketball are Los Angeles's most popular sports, with Major League Baseball's Dodgers and National Basketball Association's Lakers having the largest fanbases. Other professional baseball teams in the area include the Angels in Anaheim, the Queens of the Women's Pro Baseball League, and multiple minor league teams. Other professional basketball teams include the Clippers and the Sparks of the Women's National Basketball League.

Los Angeles features three top-level professional soccer teams: Galaxy and LAFC of Major League Soccer and Angel City of the National Women's Football League. The area also has one second division, multiple third division, and numerous semi-professional teams. The city was also home to top-level Chivas USA from 2005 to 2014.

Los Angeles is home to one National Hockey League team, the Kings, with a second, the Ducks, located in Anaheim. The area is also home to one Major League Cricket team: the Knight Riders. College teams with significant followings in Los Angeles include USC Trojans football, UCLA Bruins football, and UCLA Bruins men's basketball. The Rose Bowl Game is also held yearly in Pasadena.

Los Angeles, specifically Muscle Beach, was the birthplace of United States physical fitness boom and brought worldwide popularity to acrobatics and bodybuilding. Los Angeles is also an important destination for beach volleyball, surfing, and skateboarding due to its weather and geography. Mixed Martial Arts was conceived and created in Los Angeles as well.

In 2028, Los Angeles will become the third city to host the Olympic Games three times; the city also hosted the event in 1932 and 1984. The 1984 Olympics is widely considered to be the most financially successful modern Olympics; it generated more than $200 million ($620 million in 2025) in profit and is considered to have redefined hosting the event.

Several 1994 FIFA World Cup, 1999 FIFA Women's World Cup, 2003 FIFA Women's World Cup, 2026, and 2024 Copa América matches were held in the Los Angeles area, including the 1994, 1999, and 2003 finals. The 2031 FIFA Women's World Cup also has plans to host matches in Los Angeles.

== Visual arts ==
The plein air movement of impressionistic landscape painting found early adherents in the Los Angeles area, and the California Art Club (est. 1909) was instrumental in the development of the genre. Much of the city's art scene in the 1940s through 1980 came from collectors, collectives, print shops, art schools, and commercial galleries.

== Cultural institutions ==
=== Museums and galleries ===
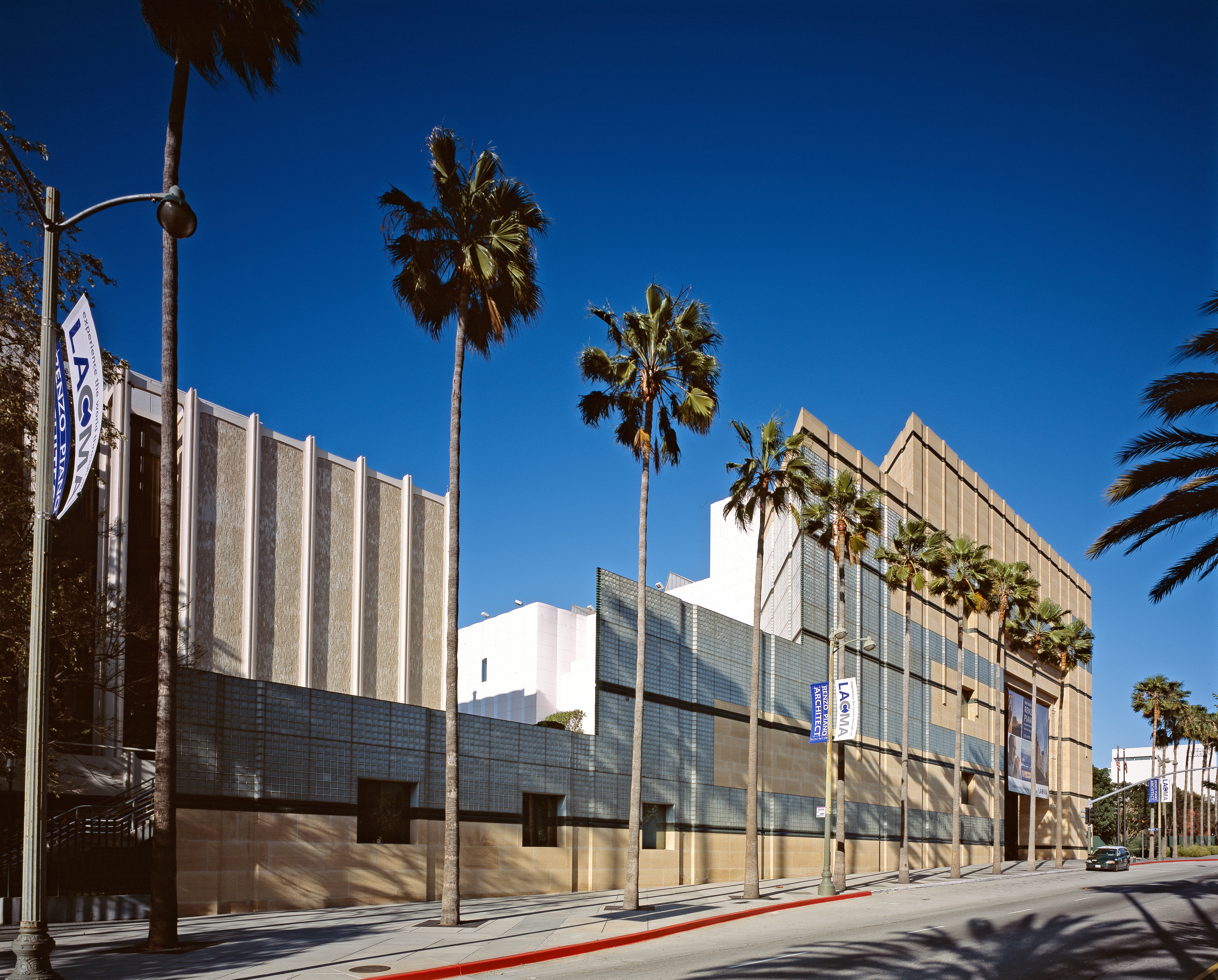
Los Angeles County Museum of Art

Los Angeles County contains more than 800 museums and art galleries, and the City of Los Angeles contains more museums per capita than any other city in the world.Gallery Row]], where tens of thousands attend a monthly Downtown Art Walk. Galleries are also concentrated on La Cienega Boulevard and in Silver Lake, Los Feliz, and Orange County.

Los Angeles County's most notable art museums include Los Angeles County Museum of Art, Getty Center, Museum of Contemporary Art, The Broad, Hammer Museum, The Huntington, Norton Simon, and the Lucas Museum of Narrative Art. Other notable museums in Los Angeles include the Natural History Museum of Los Angeles County, California Science Center, Griffith Observatory, Battleship Iowa, and the Academy, Autry, Grammy, Page, and Peterson Automotive museums. Smaller museums in the area include the Craft Contemporary, California African American, Franklin D. Murphy Sculpture Garden, LA Plaza de Cultura y Artes, and the Museum of Jurassic Technology. Many of Los Angeles's museums are concentrated in Exposition Park and Museum Row.

=== Art schools and colleges ===
Los Angeles County is home to three major art colleges: Art Center College of Design, Otis College of Art and Design, and California Institute of the Arts (Cal Arts). Cal Arts is successor to the Chouinard Art Institute.

Los Angeles County also contains many notable film schools. UCLA School of Theater, Film and Television, USC School of Cinematic Arts, and AFI Conservatory are often considered amongst the five best film schools in the country; other notable film schools include those at Cal Arts, the Art Center College of Design, Loyola Marymount, Los Angeles City College, and California State Universities Los Angeles, Long Beach, and Northridge. For-profit film schools include New York Film Academy and Los Angeles Film School.

Notable music schools in Los Angeles include USC Thornton School of Music, UCLA Herb Alpert School of Music, and Colburn School. For-profit music schools include the Musicians Institute, Los Angeles College of Music, and Los Angeles Recording School.

The Fashion Institute of Design and Merchandising is also located in Los Angeles, as are many private acting schools.

== Cultural enclaves ==
The Los Angeles metropolitan area is one of the most diverse areas in the world, with hundreds of cultures represented.

=== Ethnic enclaves ===
Ethnic Enclaves of Los Angeles Metro Area
Ethnic Enclave Name	Neighborhood	Ethnicity Represented	Official Recognition or Dedicated District
East Asian Ethnic Enclaves
Chinatown	Chinatown, Los Angeles	Chinese Americans, Taiwanese Americans, & Hong Kong Americans; as well as many other Asian Americans	Yes, 1938
626/SGV	Chinese enclaves in the San Gabriel Valley	Chinese Americans, Taiwanese Americans, & Hong Kong Americans; as well as many other Asian Americans	No
Little Taipei	Monterey Park, California	Taiwanese Americans in Los Angeles	No
Little Taipei	Rowland Heights, & Hacienda Heights, California	Taiwanese Americans in Los Angeles	No
Koreatown	Koreatown, Los Angeles	Korean Americans	Yes, 2008
Orange County Koreatown	Koreatown, Garden Grove	Korean Americans	Yes, 2019
Little Tokyo	Little Tokyo, Los Angeles	Japanese Americans	Yes, 1995
Little Osaka/Sawtelle Japantown	Sawtelle, Los Angeles	Japanese Americans	Yes, 2015
South East Asian Ethnic Enclaves
Filipinotown	Historic Filipinotown, Los Angeles	Historically Filipino Americans	Yes, 2002
ManilaTown	Downtown Riverside	Historically Filipino Americans	No
Little Manila	Carson, California	Filipino Americans	No
	Eagle Rock, Los Angeles & Glendale, California	Filipino Americans	No
	San Gabriel Valley	Filipino Americans	No
	West Long Beach	Filipino Americans	No
Little Saigon	Little Saigon, Orange County	Vietnamese Americans	Yes, 1988
Little Saigon, Los Angeles	Little Saigon, Los Angeles	Vietnamese Americans	Yes
Thai Town	Thai Town, Los Angeles	Thai Americans	Yes, October 27, 1999
Cambodia Town	Cambodia Town, Long Beach, California	Cambodian Americans	Yes, 2007
South Asian Ethnic Enclaves
Little India	Little India, Artesia, California	Indian Americans	Yes
Little Bangladesh	Little Bangladesh, Los Angeles	Bangladeshi Americans	Yes, 2010
Little Afghanistan	Hollywood	Afghan Americans	No
Middle Eastern Ethnic Enclaves
Little Armenia	Little Armenia, Los Angeles	Armenian Americans	Yes, October 6, 2000
Arabia Street	West Los Angeles	Middle Eastern Americans	No
	Reseda, Los Angeles	Middle Eastern Americans	No
Little Arabia	Anaheim, California	Egyptian American, Syrian American, Lebanese American, & Yemeni American	Pending
Little Gaza	Anaheim, California	Palestinian American	Pending
Tehrangeles or Little Persia	Westwood, Los Angeles	Iranian Americans	No
Tehrangeles or Little Persia	Southern San Fernando Valley	Iranian Americans	No
Tehrangeles or Little Persia	Beverly Hills, California	Iranian Americans	No
Persian Square	Near UCLA	Iranian Americans	No
Los Angeles Community Eruv	Agoura Hills, Beverly Hills, Hancock Park, Pico-Robertson, West Hollywood, & Westwood	Jewish American	
North Valley Eruv	Chatsworth, Granada Hills, North Hills, & Northridge	Jewish American	
Valley Eruv	North Hollywood, Valley Village, Van Nuys, Sherman Oaks, Sherman Village, and Panorama City	Jewish American	
Woodland Hills/West Hills Eruv	Woodland Hills/West Hills	Jewish American	
Latin American/Caribbean Ethnic Enclaves
El Salvador Corridor	Pico-Union, Los Angeles	Salvadoran Americans	Yes, August 2012
El Salvador Corridor	Pico-Union, Los Angeles	Guatemalan Americans, Honduran Americans, & other Central American groups	No
Little Central America	Westlake, Los Angeles & Harvard Heights, Los Angeles	Guatemalan Americans, Honduran Americans, & other Central American groups	No
Olvera Street	El Pueblo de Los Ángeles Historical Monument	Mexican Americans & Chicano	Yes, 1877
Sonoratown		Mexican Americans & Chicano	Removed, 1732–1938
	East Los Angeles, California	Mexican Americans & Chicano	No
Byzantine-Latino Quarter	Byzantine-Latino Quarter	Mexican American, & Hispanic Caribbean American	No
El Corredor Oaxaqueño	Mid-City, Los Angeles	Oaxacan Mexican Americans	No
Little Brazil	Culver City, California	Brazilian Americans & Other Lusophone Americans	No
Little Belize	Vermont Square, Los Angeles	Belizean Americans	No
African and African American Ethnic Enclaves
Little Ethiopia	Little Ethiopia, Los Angeles	Ethiopian Americans	Yes, 2002
Freetown	Whittier, California	African Americans	No
	South-central Los Angeles, Compton, Carson, Inglewood, Culver City, and Hawthorne	African Americans	No
	Antelope Valley	African Americans	No
Native American Ethnic Enclaves
Indian Alley	Skid Row, Los Angeles	Native Americans	No
Pacific Islander Ethnic Enclaves
	Carson, California	Pacific Islander Americans	No
	Eagle Rock, Los Angeles & Glendale, California	Pacific Islander Americans	No
European Ethnic Enclaves
Little Italy/Via Italia	San Pedro, Los Angeles	Italian Americans & Maltese Americans	No
Croatian Place	San Pedro, Los Angeles	Croatian Americans	No
Greektown	San Pedro, Los Angeles	Greek Americans	No
Byzantine-Latino Quarter	Byzantine-Latino Quarter	Greek Americans	No
Little Portugal	Little Portugal, Los Angeles	Portuguese Americans	No
Frogtown	Frogtown, Los Angeles & Lincoln Heights, Los Angeles	French Americans	No
Little Moscow	Los Feliz, Los Angeles	Russian Americans	No
Little Odessa	West Hollywood, California	Ukrainian Americans in Los Angeles	No

=== LGBTQ enclaves ===
Los Angeles is also home to gay villages centered around the LGBTQ community.

LGBTQ Enclaves in Los Angeles
Name	Neighborhood
Gay Village	Silver Lake, Los Angeles
Gay WeHo	West Hollywood, California

== See also ==
- LGBT culture in Los Angeles
- Media in Los Angeles
