= Ethnic groups in Los Angeles =

The 1990 United States census and 2000 United States census found that non-Hispanic whites were becoming a minority in Los Angeles. Estimates for the 2010 United States census results find Latinos to be approximately half (47-49%) of the city's population, growing from 40% in 2000 and 30-35% in 1990 census.

The racial/ethnic/cultural composition of Los Angeles as of the 2005-2009 American Community Survey was as follows:

- Hispanic or Latino (of any race): 47.5%
- White: 41.3% (Non-Hispanic Whites: 29.4%)
- Black or African American: 9.8%
- Native American: 0.5%
- Asian: 10.7%
- Native Hawaiian and Other Pacific Islander: 0.2%
- Other: 25.2%
- Two or more races: 2.8%

Approximately 59.4% of Los Angeles' residents were born in the 50 United States, and 0.9% were born in Puerto Rico, US territories, or abroad to American parents. 39.7% of the population were foreign-born. Most foreigners (64.5%) were born in Latin America. A large minority (26.3%) were born in Asia. Smaller numbers were born in Europe (6.5%), Africa (1.5%), Northern America (0.9%), and Oceania (0.3%).

== African Americans ==
Los Angeles was founded by settlers who were predominantly of African descent and the city had 2,100 Black Americans in 1900. By 1920 this grew to approximately 15,000. In 1910, the city had the highest percentage of black home ownership in the nation, with more than 36% of the city's African-American residents owning their own homes. Black leader W.E.B. Du Bois described Los Angeles in 1913 as a "wonderful place" because it was less subjected to racial discrimination due to its population being small and the ongoing tensions between Anglos and Mexicans. This changed in the 1920s when restrictive covenants that enforced segregation became widespread. Blacks were mostly confined along the South Central corridor, Watts, and small enclaves in Venice and Pacoima, which received far fewer services than other areas of the city.

After World War II, the city's black population grew from 63,774 in 1940 to 170,000 a decade later as many continued to flee from the South for better opportunities. By 1960, Los Angeles had the fifth largest black population in the United States, larger than any city in the South. Still, they remained in segregated enclaves. The Supreme Court banned the legal enforcement of race-oriented restrictive covenants in the Shelley v. Kraemer case (1948), yet black home ownership declined severely during this period.

Decades of police mistreatment and other racial injustices eventually lead to the Watts riots of 1965, after a minor traffic incident resulted in four days of rioting. Thirty-four people were killed and 1,034 injured at a cost of $40 million in property damage and looting. So many businesses burned on 103rd Street that it became known as "Charcoal Alley."

The city strove to improve social services for the black community, but with many of the high-paying industrial jobs gone black unemployment remained high. The growth of street gangs and drugs in minority communities exacerbated the problems.

By 1990, the LAPD, which had followed a paramilitaristic model since Chief Parker's regime in the 1950s, became more alienated from minority communities following accusations of racial profiling. In 1992, a jury in suburban Simi Valley acquitted white Los Angeles police officers involved in the beating of a black motorist, Rodney King, the year before. After four days of rioting, more than 50 deaths, and billions of dollars of property losses, mostly in the Central City, the California Army National Guard, federal troops, and the local and state police finally regained control.

Since the 1980s, more middle class black families have left the central core of Los Angeles to settle in other California municipalities or out of state. In 1970, blacks made up 18% of the city's population. That percentage has dropped to 10% in 2010 as many continue to leave to settle elsewhere. Los Angeles still has the largest black population of any city in the Western United States. Blacks from Los Angeles have moved to the north suburbs of Palmdale and Lancaster. Many blacks are relocating to the Southern United States.

Caribbean and African black immigrants are more recent. 7,000 Nigerians, 5,000 Ethiopians, 1,000 Ghanaians, 9,900 Jamaicans, 1,900 Haitians, and 1,700 Trinidadians live in Los Angeles. They are concentrated in South Los Angeles, Compton and Inglewood.

There is an Ethiopian and Eritrean community in Little Ethiopia.

Louisiana Creoles are present in Los Angeles. Between 1940 and 1970, roughly 5 million African Americans from the Southern United States migrated North during the Second Great Migration. Many came from Southern states bordering the Gulf Coast, primarily Texas, Louisiana, and Mississippi. Black families from Louisiana escaping Jim Crow racism primarily settled in California. Many of them were Louisiana Creoles.

=== Ethiopians ===
There is a large Ethiopian community in Little Ethiopia.

=== Eritreans ===
There is an Eritrean community in Los Angeles.

=== Jamaicans ===
Jamaicans are concentrated in South Los Angeles, South Bay and Long Beach.

=== Africans ===
There is a growing African immigrant community in Los Angeles. The largest African immigrant groups are Egyptians, Nigerians, South Africans, Ghanaians, Ethiopians, Cameroonians, Moroccans, Ugandans, Kenyans and Eritreans.

=== Louisiana Creoles ===
Black Louisiana Creole people settled in Los Angeles.

== Asian Americans ==
According to the report "A Community Of Contrasts: Asian Americans, Native Hawaiians and Pacific Islanders in Los Angeles County" by the nonprofit group Asian Americans Advancing Justice - Los Angeles (formerly the Asian Pacific American Legal Center), Los Angeles County had 1,497,960 Asian Americans as of 2010. From 2000 to 2010 the Asian population in Los Angeles County increased by 20%.

Within Los Angeles County, as of 2010 13 cities and places are majority Asian. As of that year, the City of Los Angeles had the highest numeric Asian population, with slightly fewer than 500,000. The city with the highest percentage of Asians was Monterey Park, which was 68% Asian. From 2000 to 2010 the city of Arcadia saw its Asian population increase by 38%, the largest such increase in the county.

As of 2010, in the world, except for the respective home countries, Los Angeles County has the largest populations of Burmese, Cambodian, Chinese, Filipino, Indonesian, Korean, Sri Lankan, and Thai people. In Los Angeles County the largest Asian ethnic groups were the Chinese and the Filipinos. In the period 2000-2010 the percentage of Bangladeshi Americans increased by 122%. Indian Americans, Pakistani Americans, Sri Lankan Americans, and other South Asian ethnic groups had, according to the report and as paraphrased by Elson Trinidad of KCET, "high growth rates".

As of 2010, of the Asian ethnic groups, 70% of Japanese Americans were born in the U.S., the highest such rate of the ethnic groups. 19% of Japanese Americans were senior citizens, the highest such rate of the ethnic groups. From 2000 to 2010 Japanese Americans increased by 1%, the lowest such rate.

=== Bangladeshis ===
More than 20,000 Bangladeshis live in the Los Angeles area. There is a Little Bangladesh.

=== Cambodians ===
Cambodians are concentrated in Long Beach, Van Nuys in the San Fernando Valley, the Monterey Park-Alhambra area of the south San Gabriel Valley and the Walnut-Pomona area of the east San Gabriel Valley.

=== Chinese ===
The first Chinese arrived in Los Angeles in 1850. The great majority came from Guangdong Province in southeastern China, seeking a fortune in Gum Saan ("Gold Mountain"), the Chinese name for America. Henry Huntington came to value their expertise as engineers. He later said he would not have been able to build his portion of the transcontinental railroad without them. After the transcontinental railroad was completed, most took their earnings and returned to China, where they could find a wife and own a little land. Others moved to Chinatowns in the cities. By 1870, there were 178 Chinese in LA; 80% were adult men. Most worked as launderers, cooks and fruit and vegetable growers and sellers. Labor unions blamed Chinese for lowering the wages and living standards of Anglo workers, and for being ruled by violent secret societies known as "tongs." The newspapers of both Los Angeles and San Francisco were filled with anti-Chinese propaganda.

The thriving Chinatown, on the eastern edge of the Plaza, was the site of terrible violence on October 24, 1871. A gunfight between rival tongs resulted in the accidental death of a white man. This enraged the bystanders, and a mob of about 500 Anglos and Latinos descended on Chinatown. They randomly lynched 19 Chinese men and boys, only one of whom may have been involved in the original killing. Homes and businesses were looted. Only 10 rioters were tried. Eight were convicted of manslaughter, but their convictions were overturned the following year on a legal technicality. This Chinese Massacre of 1871 was the first time that Los Angeles was reported on the front pages of newspapers all over the world, even crowding out reports of the Great Chicago Fire, which had taken place two weeks earlier. While the Los Angeles Star went so far to call the massacre "a glorious victory", others fretted about the city's racist and violent image. With the coming economic opportunities of the railroads, city fathers set themselves to wipe out mob violence.

Their efforts, however, led to more restrictive measures against the Chinese. In 1878–79, the city council passed several measures adversely affecting Chinese vegetable merchants. The merchants went on strike. Los Angeles went without vegetables for several weeks, finally bringing the city to the bargaining table. Historian William Estrada wrote: "This little-known event may have helped the Chinese to better understand their role in the community as well as the power of organization as a means for community self-defense. The strike was a sign that Los Angeles was undergoing dramatic social, economic, and technological change and that the Chinese were a part of that change."

=== Filipinos ===
The city of Los Angeles is home to one of the largest communities of Filipinos abroad, boasting a population of nearly 150,000 people both foreign-born and multi-generational. Filipino American communities can be found throughout the city, however there is a dedicated Historic Filipinotown located near Echo Park.

=== Indians ===
Around 109,000 Indian Americans reside in Los Angeles County.

=== Indonesians ===
There is an Indonesian community in the Los Angeles area.

=== Japanese ===
The labor vacuum created by the Chinese Exclusion Act of 1882 was filled by Japanese workers and, by 1910, the settlement known as "Little Tokyo" had risen next to Chinatown. As of December 1941, there were 37,000 ethnic Japanese in Los Angeles County, most of the adults lacked United States citizenship. It was disrupted in 1942 with all the residents moved to relocation camps inland in the Japanese American internment.

=== Koreans ===
Since 1965 when the immigration laws were liberalized, Los Angeles has emerged as a major center of the Korean American community. Its "Koreatown" is often seen as the "overseas Korean capital." Many have been entrepreneurs, opening shops and small factories. Koreatown experienced rapid transition in the 1990s, with heavy investment by Korean banks and corporations, and the arrival of tens of thousands of Koreans, as well as even larger numbers of Hispanic workers. Many entrepreneurs opened small businesses, and were hard hit by the 1992 Los Angeles riots. More recently, L.A.'s Koreatown has been perceived to have experienced declining political power secondary to re-districting and an increased crime rate, prompting an exodus of Koreans from the area. After the riots many relocated to the San Francisco Bay Area.

According to Park (1998) the violence against Korean Americans in 1992 stimulated a new wave of political activism among Korean Americans, but it also split them into two main camps. The "liberals" sought to unite with other minorities in Los Angeles to fight against racial oppression and scapegoating. The "conservatives," emphasized law and order and generally favored the economic and social policies of the Republican Party. The conservatives tended to emphasize the political differences between Koreans and other minorities, specifically blacks and Hispanics. Abelmann and Lie, (1997) report that the most profound result was the politicization of Korean Americans, all across the U.S. The younger generation especially realized they had been too uninvolved in American politics, and the riot shifted their political attention from South Korea to conditions in the United States.

=== Roma ===
50,000 Roma live in Los Angeles.

=== Thais ===
The largest Thai diaspora outside of Thailand is in Los Angeles. The ethnic enclave Thai Town, Los Angeles epitomizes the Thai community in Los Angeles.

=== Vietnamese ===
87,468 Vietnamese people lived in Los Angeles in 2010. There is a Vietnamese community in the Los Angeles area. The Vietnamese are concentrated in Westminster and Garden Grove in Greater Los Angeles, while other Vietnamese are scattered in small communities around Los Angeles. In the San Fernando Valley, the only significant Vietnamese community is in Reseda.

== European Americans ==
The first Europeans to settle in Los Angeles were the Spanish. Spanish explorer Juan Rodríguez Cabrillo claimed the land for the Crown of Castile on October 6, 1542. White people are concentrated in Hollywood Hills. There is also a large white population in South Bay, Palos Verdes Peninsula, Bel Air, Malibu, and some sections of the San Gabriel Valley.

=== Basques ===
There is a Basque community in Los Angeles.

=== Bosnians ===
There is a Bosnian community in the city. In the 1980 and 1990 Census, Bosnian people had established themselves in Los Angeles, before the breakup of the former Yugoslavia and Bosnian War of the 1990s. However, Yugoslav immigration was already ongoing in Los Angeles and beyond, in Southern California (i.e. San Pedro, Los Angeles), since the turn of the 20th century's global immigration boom.

=== British ===
Approximately 200,000 British people live in Los Angeles County. Many reside in Santa Monica.

=== Croatians ===
San Pedro, Los Angeles has over 40,000 Croat immigrants and descendants. Croatians settled in the San Pedro area helped develop the tuna industry.

=== Dutch ===
There is a Dutch American presence in the Los Angeles area. The Dutch communities in Southern California emerged as prominent figures in the state's dairy industry. Dutch dairy farms were primarily located in suburban areas surrounding Los Angeles, such as Chino, Artesia, Bellflower and Hynes. In the 1920s, a settlement known as Kleine Nederland (now Paramount) was established in the region, which functioned as a lively social hub. While distinct cultural enclaves have diminished over time, it is noteworthy that approximately fifty percent of all Dutch immigrants arriving in California since World War II continue to do so.

=== French ===
There is a French community in Los Angeles.

French international schools include Lycée Français de Los Angeles and International School of Los Angeles.

=== Greeks ===
There is a Greek community in Los Angeles. There is a historically Greek community near Downtown LA known as the Byzantine-Latino Quarter now.

There are also big populations of Greeks in Venice, Los Angeles, making up 2% of the neighborhood's population, far higher than the 0.1-0.2% of LA being Greek ethnically. There are 3,500 people with self-reported solitaire Greek ancestry, and another 9,000 report partial Greek ancestry in the City of Los Angeles; this amounts to 12,000 Greek people living in L.A., nearly 1/3 of a percentage of L.A.'s population.

=== Italians ===
There is an Italian community in San Pedro.

=== Russians ===
There is a Russian community in West Hollywood. Russians are also concentrated in Hidden Hills, Calabasas, Los Angeles, Westlake Village, and Agoura Hills.

=== Ukrainians ===
Los Angeles is home to approximately 34,000 Ukrainians.

=== Poles ===
More than 56,000 people of Polish descent live in Los Angeles.

=== Lithuanians ===
There is a Lithuanian community in St. Casimir Lithuanian parish in the Los Feliz area.

=== Latvians ===
There is a Latvian presence in Los Angeles. Around 300 Latvians resided in Los Angeles in 1930. The Latvians worked as surveyors, painters, shoemakers, carpenters, fishermen, farmers, machinists, gardeners and shopkeepers.

=== Romanians ===
More than 10,000 Romanians live in the Greater Los Angeles area. Romanians are scattered in neighborhoods ranging from Santa Monica to Bell.

== Native Americans ==
1,700 people Tongva people lived in Los Angeles in 2008. In 2022, some land of Los Angeles County was returned to the Tongva tribe.

Native Americans and Alaskan Natives (including Latin American Indian groups) are a low-percentage, yet notable, part of the population. Los Angeles is thought to have the largest Urban Indian community in the United States (est. above 100,000-about 2% or higher upwards to 5% of the city population) who belong to over 100 tribal nations. There are between 2,000 and 25,000 members of the Cherokee Nation based in Tahlequah, Oklahoma in the city and county respectively. There is the local Chumash tribe whose homeland encompasses the Los Angeles Basin and Central Coast of California. Native Americans in Los Angeles, like throughout the country, are referred to an "invisible minority" in the press.

== Hispanic and Latino Americans ==
The city has witnessed a development of a Hispanic (mainly Mexican) cultural presence since its settlement as a city in 1781. Mexican Americans have been one of the largest ethnic groups in Los Angeles since the 1910 census, as Mexican immigrants and U.S.-born Mexicans from the Southwest states came to the booming industrial economy of the LA area between 1915 and 1960, the Mexican-American or Chicano population was estimated at 815,000 by 1970. This migration peaked in the 1920s and again in the World War II era (1941–45).

The city's original barrios were located in the eastern half of the city and the unincorporated community of East Los Angeles. The trend of Hispanization began in 1970, then accelerated in the 1980s and 1990s with immigration from Mexico and Central America (especially El Salvador, Honduras, and Guatemala). These immigrants settled in the city's eastern and southern neighborhoods. Salvadoran Americans are the second largest Hispanic population in Los Angeles, a city which holds the largest Salvadoran population outside of El Salvador and the Salvadoran diaspora living abroad and overseas. These were refugees that arrived in the 1980s and 1990s during the Salvadoran Civil War which was part of the Central American crisis. By 2000, South Los Angeles was a majority Latino area, displacing most previous African American and Asian American residents. The city is often said to have the largest Mexican population outside Mexico and has the largest Spanish-speaking population outside Latin America or Spain. As of 2007, estimates of the number of residents originally from the Mexican state of Oaxaca ranged from 50,000 to 250,000. Central American, Cuban, Puerto Rican, and South American nationalities are also represented.

There is a shift of second and third generation Mexican Americans out of Los Angeles into nearby suburbs, such as Ventura County, Orange County, San Diego, and the Inland Empire, California region. Mexican and other Hispanic immigrants moved in east and south sections of Los Angeles and sometimes, Asian immigrants moved into historic barrios to become mostly Asian American areas. Starting in the late 1980s, Downey has become a renowned Latino majority community in Southern California, and the majority of residents moved in were middle or upper-middle class, and second and third generation Mexican Americans.

The anti-union, open-shop heritage of the Chandlers and the Los Angeles Times continued to assure Los Angeles of a steady supply of cheap labor from Mexico and Central America throughout the 20th century. This was met by the increasing opposition of anti-immigration forces throughout the country.

A steady migration of Mexicans to California from 1910 to 1930 expanded the Mexican and Latino population in Los Angeles to 97,116 or 7.8%. In 1930, a large repatriation of 400–500,000 Mexican immigrants and their children began after the onset of the Depression, massive unemployment, encouragement by the government of Mexico, the threat of deportation and welfare agencies willing to pay for the tickets of those leaving (some 2 million European immigrants left as well).

At the same time, the city celebrated its 150th anniversary in 1931 with a grand "fiesta de Los Angeles" featuring a blond "reina" in historic ranchera costume. By 1940 the Latino population dropped to 7.1%, but remained at slightly over 100,000.

During World War II, hostility toward Mexican-Americans took a different form, as local newspapers portrayed Chicano youths, who sometimes called themselves "pachucos", as barely civilized gangsters. Anglo servicemen attacked young Chicanos dressed in the pachuco uniform of the day: long coats with wide shoulders and pleated, high-waisted, pegged pants, or zoot suits. In 1943, twenty-two young Chicanos were convicted of a murder of another youth at a party held at a swimming hole southeast of Los Angeles known as the "sleepy lagoon" on a warm night in August 1942; they were eventually freed after an appeal that demonstrated both their innocence and the racism of the judge conducting the trial. Today, the event is known as the Zoot Suit Riots.

In the 1960s and 1970s, Chicanos and/or Mexican-Americans in Los Angeles organized protests and demonstrations calling for their civil rights and promoted self-empowerment in the Chicano Movement. In the 1990s, redistricting led to the election of Latino members of the city council and the first Latino members of the Los Angeles County Board of Supervisors since its inception. In 1994, California voters passed Proposition 187, which denied undocumented immigrants and their families in California welfare, health benefits, and education.

City council member Antonio Villaraigosa was elected mayor in 2005, the first Latino elected to that office since the 1872.

In 2006 anti-immigration forces supported the federal Border Protection, Anti-terrorism and Illegal Immigration Control Act of 2005 (H.R. 4437). The act made "unlawful presence" an "aggravated felony." On 25 March, a million Latinos staged La Gran Marcha on City Hall to protest the bill. It was the largest demonstration in California history. Similar protests in other cities across the country made this a turning point in the debate on immigration reform.

Hispanics are concentrated in San Gabriel Valley suburbs like El Monte, Baldwin Park, Irwindale, and West Covina.

More than 10,000 Chileans live in the Los Angeles area.

== Middle Eastern Americans ==
Middle Eastern groups in the Los Angeles area include Arab, Armenian, Iranian, and Israeli populations. The U.S. Census classifies them as "White".

Over 50% of Middle Eastern men in Los Angeles held professional and managerial jobs as of 1990. Compared to men, women of Middle Eastern backgrounds had less of a likelihood of having these positions. A large number of Middle Eastern immigrants to Los Angeles are self-employed.

=== Arabs ===
As of the 1990 U.S. census, the Los Angeles area had 80,000 Arabs, making up 9% of the total number of Arabs in the United States. This was, outside of Metro Detroit, one of the largest Arab populations in the country. As of 1996 economic reasons were the primary reasons for Arab immigration.

Most Arabs in the Los Angeles area come from Egypt and Lebanon; Arabs from other countries in the Middle East and North Africa are present. Most Arabs in Los Angeles are Muslim and Christian, though some are Jewish.

As of 1996, the self-employment rate of Arab managers and professionals in Los Angeles is over 50%.

The New Horizon School, a private Muslim day school in South Pasadena, was established in 1984 and had sponsorship of the Islamic Center of Southern California. 80% of its student body, as of 1988, was Muslim. The school had one daily hour of Arabic language instruction for its students.

=== Armenians ===
The Los Angeles metropolitan area has a significant Armenian American population. Beginning in the 1970s, large waves of Armenian immigration to Los Angeles took place, as a result of the Lebanese Civil War, the Iranian Revolution, the collapse of the Soviet Union, and the First Nagorno-Karabakh War

=== Israelis ===
As of the 1990 U.S. census, the Los Angeles area had 20,000 Israelis, making up 17% of the total number of Israelis in the United States. This was the second-largest Israeli population after that of New York City. As of 1996 economic reasons were the primary reasons for Israeli immigration.

As of 1996 most immigrants from Israel to Los Angeles are Jews who are Hebrew-speakers.

As of 1996, the self-employment rate of Israeli managers and professionals in Los Angeles is over 50%.

== Pacific Islander Americans ==
According to the report "A Community Of Contrasts: Asian Americans, Native Hawaiians and Pacific Islanders in Los Angeles County" by the nonprofit group Asian Americans Advancing Justice - Los Angeles, Los Angeles County had 54,169 Pacific Islanders as of 2010. From 2000 to 2010 the Pacific Islander population in Los Angeles County increased by 9%. In 2010 the City of Los Angeles had 15,000 Pacific Islanders, the numerically largest in the county. The largest such per capita population was in Carson. From 2000 to 2010 the number of Pacific Islanders in Glendale increased by 74%, the largest such increase in the county.

The population of Fijian Americans in the county grew by 68% during 2000–2010, making them the fastest growing Pacific Islander group. Los Angeles County, as of 2013, has the largest population of non-immigrant Native Hawaiians on the mainland United States.

=== Hawaiians ===
There is a Hawaiian community in Los Angeles.

== Others ==
More than 50,000 Roma live in Los Angeles. Los Angeles has the largest population of Romani Americans in the United States.

The history of Rivertown, aka "Frogtown", a late 19th century enclave of French immigrants in downtown Los Angeles.

Los Angeles has a significant Italian population.

More than 56,000 people of Polish descent live in Los Angeles.

Brazilians are concentrated in Culver City and Palms.

Approximately 40,000 Australian Americans reside in the Los Angeles area. Los Angeles has the largest Australian population in the US.

There is a Belizean immigrant community in Los Angeles.

Los Angeles has a Lithuanian community, mostly concentrated in a section dubbed "Little Lithuania", located north of downtown, by the city of Los Angeles.

== Ethnoreligious groups ==
=== Churches ===
Mormons who are members of the Church of Jesus Christ of Latter-Day Saints developed a community in Los Angeles as early as the 1890s by settlers from their home base in Utah arrived in the Los Angeles Basin. Their temple is in Westwood, a section of western Los Angeles.

== Ethnic enclaves ==
Ethnic enclaves like Chinatown, the Byzantine-Latino Quarter, Historic Filipinotown, Little Saigon, Little Armenia, Little Ethiopia, Little Bangladesh, Little Moscow (in Hollywood), Little Tokyo, Croatian Place and Via Italia in San Pedro, several Koreatowns, Tehrangeles in West Los Angeles, the Chinese enclaves in the San Gabriel Valley and Thai Town provide examples of the polyglot multicultural character of Los Angeles. Below is a list of many ethnic enclaves present in the Los Angeles metropolitan area.

| Ethnic Enclave Name | Neighborhood | Ethnicity Represented | Official Recognition or Dedicated District |
East Asian Ethnic Enclaves
| Chinatown | Chinatown, Los Angeles | Chinese Americans, Taiwanese Americans, & Hong Kong Americans; as well as many other Asian Americans | Yes, 1938 |
| 626/SGV | Chinese enclaves in the San Gabriel Valley | Chinese Americans, Taiwanese Americans, & Hong Kong Americans; as well as many other Asian Americans | No |
| | Cerritos, California | Chinese Americans, Taiwanese Americans, & Hong Kong Americans; as well as many other Asian Americans | No |
| | Irvine & Tustin, California | Chinese Americans, Taiwanese Americans, & Hong Kong Americans; as well as many other Asian Americans | No |
| | Chino Hills & Eastvale, California | Chinese Americans, Taiwanese Americans, & Hong Kong Americans; as well as many other Asian Americans | No |
| Little Taipei | Monterey Park, California | Taiwanese Americans in Los Angeles, Chinese Americans | No |
| Little Taipei | Rowland Heights, & Hacienda Heights, California | Taiwanese Americans in Los Angeles, Chinese Americans | No |
| Koreatown | Koreatown, Los Angeles | Korean Americans | Yes, 2008 |
| Orange County Koreatown | Koreatown, Garden Grove | Korean Americans | Yes, 2019 |
| North Orange County Koreantown | Buena Park, Fullerton, & La Mirada | Korean Americans | Yes, 2023 |
| Pachappa Camp | Riverside, California | Historically Korean Americans | Yes, December 6, 2016 |
| Little Tokyo | Little Tokyo, Los Angeles | Japanese Americans as well as many other Asian Americans | Yes, 1995 |
| Little Osaka/Sawtelle Japantown | Sawtelle, Los Angeles | Japanese Americans as well as many other Asian Americans | Yes, 2015 |
| Japan's 48th prefecture | Torrance, & Gardena, California | Japanese Americans as well as many other Asian Americans | No |
| | Costa Mesa | Japanese Americans as well as many other Asian Americans | No |
| Little Saigon | Little Saigon, Orange County in Westminster, Garden Grove, & Fountain Valley, California | Vietnamese Americans | Yes, 1988 |
South East Asian Ethnic Enclaves
| Filipinotown | Historic Filipinotown, Los Angeles | Filipino Americans | Yes, 2002 |
| Manilatown | Downtown Riverside | Filipino Americans | No |
| Little Manila | West Covina, California | Filipino Americans | Yes, 2017 |
| | Panorama City, Eagle Rock, & Glendale | Filipino Americans | No |
| | Cerritos, California | Filipino Americans | No |
| | Rancho Cucamonga | Filipino Americans | No |
| | Carson & Long Beach, California | Filipino Americans | No |
| Thai Town | Thai Town, Los Angeles | Thai Americans | Yes, October 27, 1999 |
| Cambodia Town | Cambodia Town, Long Beach, California | Cambodian Americans | Yes, 2007 |
South Asian Ethnic Enclaves
| Little India | Little India, Artesia, California | Indian Americans | Yes |
| Little Bangladesh | Little Bangladesh, Los Angeles | Bangladeshi Americans | Yes, 2010 |
Middle Eastern Ethnic Enclaves
| Little Armenia | Little Armenia, Los Angeles | Armenian Americans | Yes, October 6, 2000 |
| Arabia Street | West Los Angeles | Middle Eastern Americans | No |
| | Reseda, Los Angeles | Middle Eastern Americans | No |
| Little Arabia | Anaheim, California | Egyptian American, Syrian American, Lebanese American, & Yemeni American | Yes, August 24, 2022 |
| Little Gaza | Anaheim, California | Palestinian American | Pending |
| Tehrangeles or Little Persia | Westwood, Los Angeles | Iranian Americans | No |
| Tehrangeles or Little Persia | Southern San Fernando Valley | Iranian Americans | No |
| Tehrangeles or Little Persia | Beverly Hills, California | Iranian Americans | No |
| Persian Square | Near UCLA | Iranian Americans | Yes, 2010 |
| Little Afghanistan | Hollywood | Afghan Americans | No |
| Los Angeles Community Eruv | Agoura Hills, Beverly Hills, Hancock Park, Pico-Robertson, West Hollywood, & Westwood | Jewish American | |
| North Valley Eruv | Chatsworth, Granada Hills, North Hills, & Northridge | Jewish American | |
| Valley Eruv | North Hollywood, Valley Village, Van Nuys, Sherman Oaks, Sherman Village, and Panorama City | Jewish American | |
| Woodland Hills/West Hills Eruv | Woodland Hills/West Hills | Jewish American | |
Latin American/Caribbean Ethnic Enclaves
| El Salvador Corridor | Pico-Union, Los Angeles | Salvadoran Americans | Yes, August 2012 |
| El Salvador Corridor | Pico-Union, Los Angeles | Guatemalan Americans, Honduran Americans, & other Central American groups | No |
| Little Central America | Westlake, Los Angeles & Harvard Heights, Los Angeles | Guatemalan Americans, Honduran Americans, & other Central American groups | No |
| Olvera Street | El Pueblo de Los Ángeles Historical Monument | Mexican Americans & Chicano | Yes, 1877 |
| Sonoratown | | Mexican Americans & Chicano | Removed, 1732–1938 |
| Mariachi Plaza | East Los Angeles, California | Mexican Americans & Chicano | No |
| Gateway Cities | | Mexican Americans & Chicano | No |
| | El Monte, La Puente, and Baldwin Park | Mexican Americans & Chicano | No |
| | Santa Ana | Mexican Americans & Chicano | No |
| | San Fernando | Mexican Americans & Chicano | No |
| Anaheim Colony District | Anaheim, California | Mexican Americans & Chicano | No |
| | Pomona and Ontario | Mexican Americans & Chicano | No |
| San Bernardino Valley | San Bernardino, Colton, Fontana, Rialto, and Bloomington | Mexican Americans & Chicano | No |
| | Moreno Valley and Perris | Mexican Americans & Chicano | No |
| | Riverside, Corona, and Jurupa Valley | Mexican Americans & Chicano | No |
| Byzantine-Latino Quarter | Byzantine-Latino Quarter, Los Angeles | Mexican American, & Hispanic Caribbean American | No |
| El Corredor Oaxaqueño | Mid-City, Los Angeles | Oaxacan Mexican Americans | No |
| Little Brazil | Culver City, California | Brazilian Americans & Other Lusophone Americans | No |
| Little Belize | Vermont Square, Los Angeles | Belizean Americans | No |
African and African American Ethnic Enclaves
| Little Ethiopia | Little Ethiopia, Los Angeles | Ethiopian Americans | Yes, 2002 |
| Freetown | Whittier, California | African Americans | No |
| | South-central Los Angeles, Compton, Carson, Inglewood, Culver City, and Hawthorne | African Americans | No |
| | Altadena, California | African Americans | No |
| | Antelope Valley | African Americans | No |
Native American Ethnic Enclaves
| Indian Alley | Skid Row, Los Angeles | Native Americans | No |
Pacific Islander Ethnic Enclaves
| | Carson, California | Pacific Islander Americans | No |
| | Eagle Rock, Los Angeles & Glendale, California | Pacific Islander Americans | No |
Anglo American Ethnic Enclaves
| Orange Coast | Huntington Beach, California, Newport Beach, California, Laguna Beach, California, Dana Point, California, and San Clemente, California | Anglo Americans | No |
| Horsetown USA | Norco, California | Anglo Americans | No |
| | Malibu, California | Anglo Americans | No |
European Ethnic Enclaves
| Little Italy | Downtown LA, modern day Chinatown, Los Angeles | Historically Italian Americans | No |
| Little Italy/Via Italia | San Pedro, Los Angeles | Italian Americans & Maltese Americans | Yes |
| Croatian Place | San Pedro, Los Angeles | Croatian Americans | No |
| Little Norway | San Pedro, Los Angeles | Norwegian Americans | No |
| Greektown | Historically a Greek Americans area, although it remains with Greek events, churches, and significant but lesser of a Greek-American population, in the 2020s. | No | |
| Byzantine-Latino Quarter | Historically a Greek Americans area, although it remains with Greek events, churches, and significant but lesser of a Greek-American population, in the 2020s. | Byzantine-Latino Quarter, Los Angeles | No |
| Little Portugal | Artesia, California | Historically Portuguese Americans | No |
| Frogtown | Frogtown, Los Angeles & Lincoln Heights, Los Angeles | Historically French Americans | No |
| Little Moscow | West Hollywood, California | Russian Americans | No |
| Little Odessa | West Hollywood, California | Ukrainian Americans in Los Angeles and Russian Americans | No |
| Little Britain | Santa Monica, California | British Americans | No |
| Anaheim, California | Anaheim, California | Historically German Americans | No |
| Dairyland | Artesia, Bellflower, Cerritos, Cypress, La Mirada, La Palma, Norwalk, & Paramount, California | Historically Dutch Americans | No |

== Historical demographics ==
Los Angeles has a history of Jewish residents, and they used to have neighborhoods on the East side of Los Angeles in the early 20th century. Nowadays, Jews in Los Angeles tend to live in the West side and the San Fernando Valley.

The Asian population increased.

Los Angeles had a wave of Okies from Oklahoma, the Great Plains and the Southeast states, who were rural whites fleeing drought-ravaged or economically depressed areas in the 1930s, many of them briefly settled in the Arroyo Seco section.

== Ancestries ==
| Ancestry by origin (2021) | Number | % |
|---|---|---|
| (Afghanistan) Afghan | 2,513 | |
| (Albania) Albanian | 52 | |
| Arab | 23,680 | |
| (Armenia) Armenian | 67,653 | |
| (Australia) Australian | 954 | |
| (Brazil) Brazilian | 1,502 | |
| (Netherlands) Dutch | 3,375 | |
| (Turkey) Turkish | 2,458 | |
| (Romania) Romanian | 2,835 | |
| (Hungary) Hungarian | 3,946 | |
| (Greece) Greek | 3,316 | |
| (Italy) Italian | 33,929 | |
| British | 6,619 | |
| Bulgarian | 483 | |
| Latvian | 78 | |
| Lithuanian | 1,157 | |
| Israeli | 7,716 | |
| South African | 1,320 | |
| Russian | 27,591 | |
| Polish | 12,248 | |
| German | 32,638 | |
| Ethiopian | 4,151 | |
| Canadian | 2,031 | |

== See also ==
- Demographics of Los Angeles
- Hispanics and Latinos in California
- History of Los Angeles
