= Zaferia, Long Beach, California =

Neighborhood in Long Beach, California

Zaferia
- Neighborhood of Long Beach
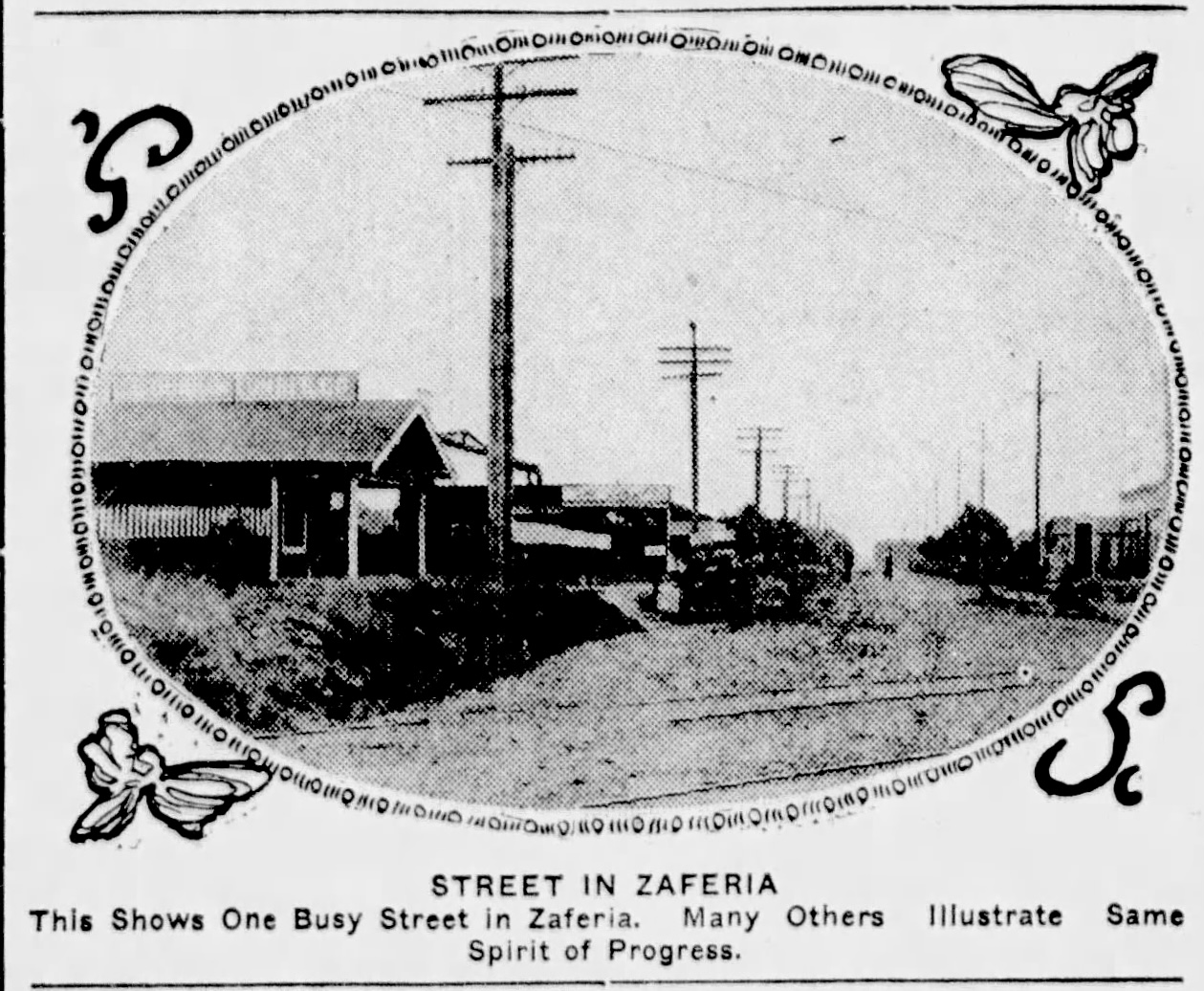
- Zaferia, 1913

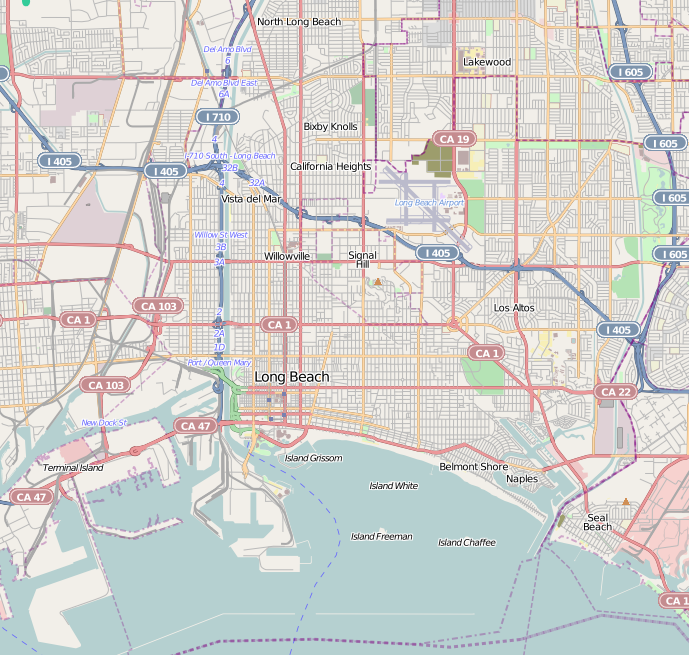
- Location within Long Beach, California
- Country: United States
- State: California
- County: Los Angeles
- City: Long Beach
- Website: zaferia.org

Zaferia, sometimes Zafaria or Zefaria, is a neighborhood in the eastern part of Long Beach, California. It corresponds to the area around Anaheim Street and Redondo Avenue, specifically "Anaheim Street, between Temple and Loma Avenues, extending north of Pacific Coast Highway and south to 11th Street". It was founded as a small town, and shortly thereafter was served by the Pacific Electric Railway's Balboa Line, which had a station named "Zaferia" near Anaheim and Redondo at the junction with the 3rd Street/Redondo Avenue local.

== History ==
The area that came to be known as Zefaria was settled as early as 1899. According to a 1919 article in the Long Beach Telegram, Zefaria is a "name conferred by the Pacific Electric on the stopping point at the Redondo crossing over the then-new Newport Beach line of the Pacific Electric." The rail stop was established in 1904. There were two house lots for sale on Zafaria Street near the Anaheim road in 1906. According to the city of Long Beach, the name was put on a sign at the rail station, and according the 1919 newspaper account, zefaría meant farmhouse or village in "Mexican". According to the Long Beach Library, no one really knows how to spell or pronounce Zaferia/Zafaria/Zefaria correctly.

The area cites 1913 as its date of founding; by that time, the area contained numerous businesses and even a newspaper. It was one of a handful of "wet" cities in Los Angeles County in the 1910s. By 1919 it supported several small factories and a jitney bus up and down Anaheim Avenue. There was a domestic violence murder-suicide in front of "an electric train crew and passengers" at Zafaria station in 1919. There was a Zaferia branch of the Long Beach Public Library at 3351 East Anaheim Street. This branch was later known as either Zaferia or East Long Beach until the 1924 establishment of the "first East Long Beach branch building owned and built by the city" on Freeman Avenue.

Zaferia was annexed by Long Beach in 1920. A park established in 1953 at Pacific Coast Highway and Redondo bears the name Plaza Zafaria.

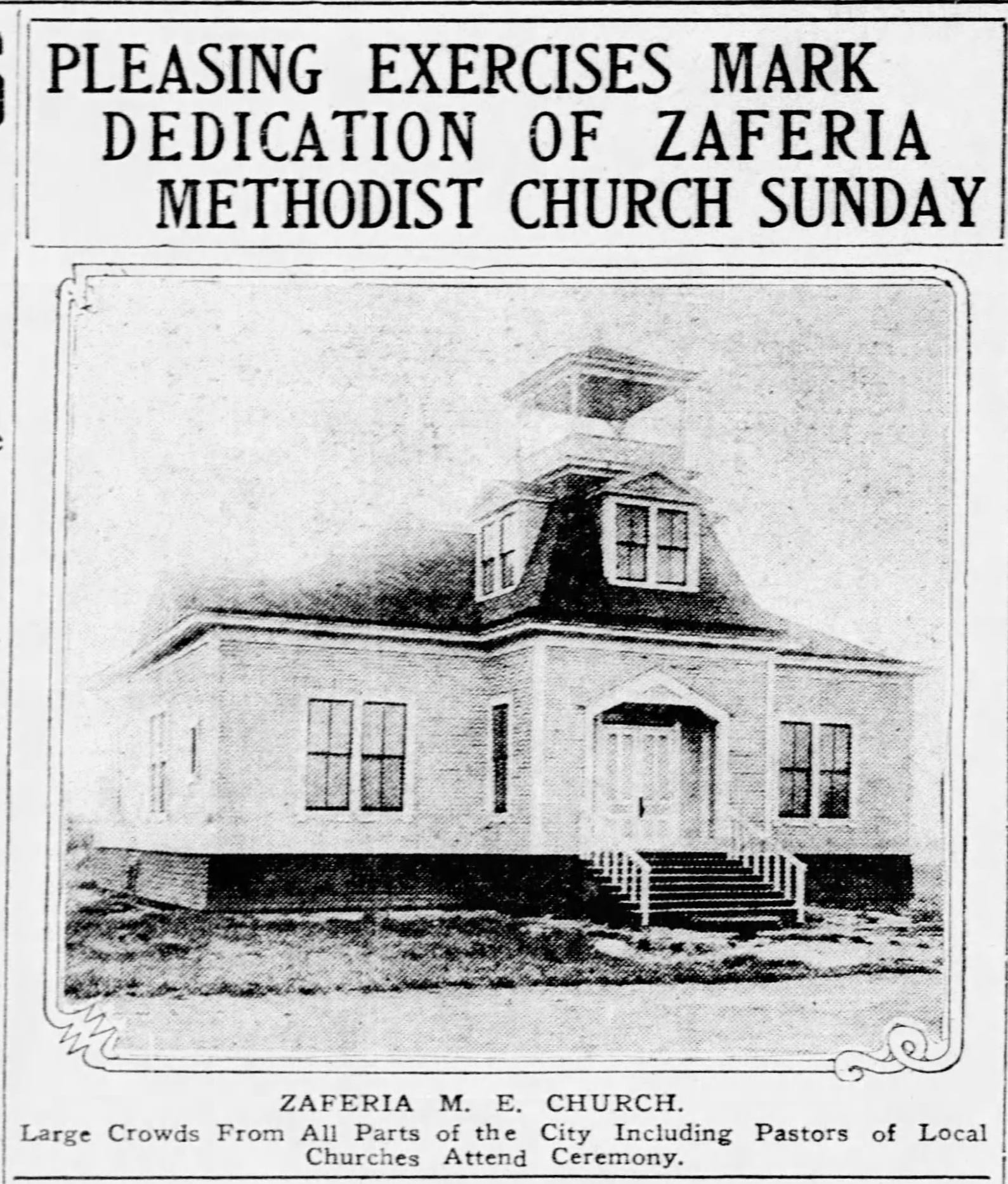
Zaferia Methodist Church, 1913

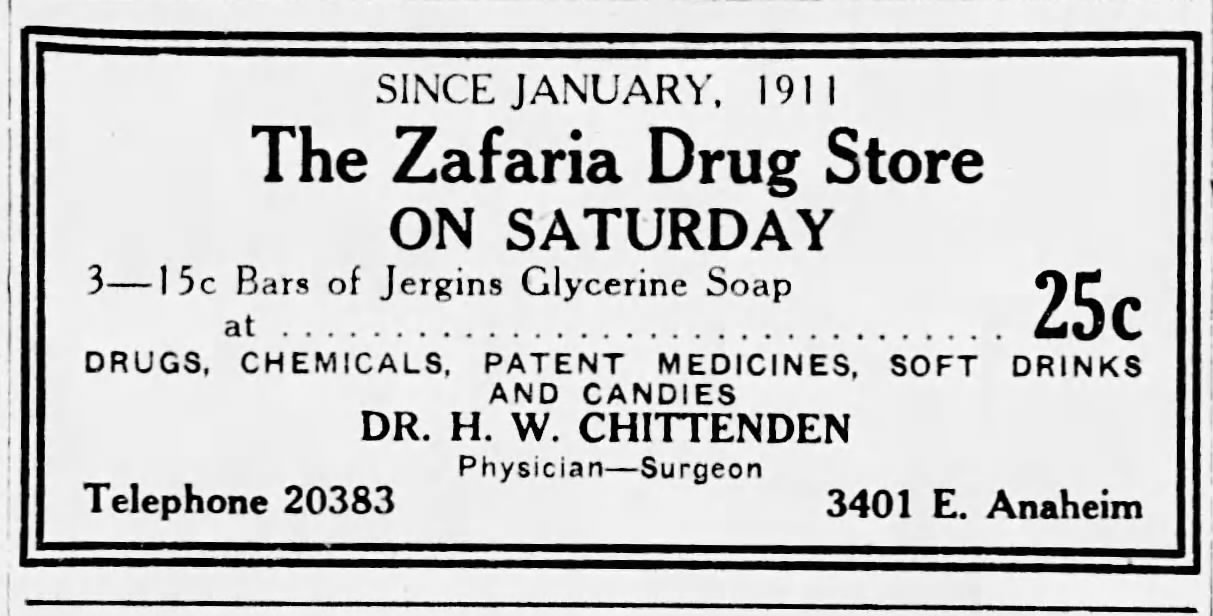
Zafaria Drug Store ad, 1921

Business at Anaheim St. and Stanley Ave., 1977

The Zaferia Business Association, formerly known as the East Anaheim Street Business Alliance, was formed in 1991.

== See also ==
- Neighborhoods of Long Beach, California
- Eastside, Long Beach, California
