= Eastside, Long Beach, California =

Coastal area in the United States

Coordinates: 33.8041°N 118.1944°W

Eastside or East Side has had two different meanings in the city of Long Beach, California. The first, and more current meaning, refers to an area roughly comprising the eastern half of the city, usually excluding areas south of the east–west line made by Pacific Coast Highway/Atherton Street. This area is also called East Long Beach. The second meaning was the area east of the Los Angeles River and north of downtown Long Beach and became notable in the hip-hop gangsta rap of the 1990s.

The neighborhood has a large Jamaican and Lebanese population.

Cambodia Town is located in the neighborhood.

== East Long Beach ==
East Long Beach is a large area of Long Beach, roughly comprising the eastern geographic half of the city, but usually excluding areas south of the east–west line made by Pacific Coast Highway/Atherton Street. East Long Beach is generally taken to extend north to the northern city boundary and east to the eastern city boundary. Areas east of the 605 Freeway and the San Gabriel River such as El Dorado Park near Orange County form the easternmost boundary. The western boundary is less well-defined, given variously as Lakewood Boulevard, and the Long Beach Municipal Airport to form part of the western boundary.

The neighborhood consists of all or portions of the 90815, 90808, 90804, and 90803 ZIP codes and is adjacent to the Traffic Circle, the California State University, Long Beach campus, the Los Angeles County cities of Lakewood and Hawaiian Gardens, and the Orange County cities of Cypress and Los Alamitos.

The area was formerly known as Zaferia. As the demand for commerce grew and more midwestern immigrants recognized the benefits of Zaferia, the traditional Mexican village lifestyle began to diminish. Lots were quickly purchased for $400 and resold for five times that amount. W. Jay Burgin, an early local investor, constructed homes and shops at 1100 Redondo. The Zaferia Branch library was established at the intersection of Freeman and Anaheim, while the Alamitos Heights School was situated at Anaheim and Temple. Additionally, the Zaferia Methodist Episcopal Church was built alongside a separate Mexican Methodist Church. In 1913, a group identifying themselves as the "Security Syndicate" placed a significant advertisement in newspapers from Los Angeles and Long Beach promoting the sale of lots in Zaferia Heights. The advertisement outlined several reasons to invest in this development, with the primary claim being that these were "highly restricted residential home sites." This served as a clear indication that the neighborhood was on the verge of transformation. Over the subsequent seven years, the village transitioned from a tranquil rural area dominated by predominantly Mexican families to a commercial hub filled with factories and shops. Eventually, Zaferia evolved into what is now known as East Long Beach.

== Demographics ==
The largest race in the neighborhood is white, making up 38.6%. The next most-common ethnic group is Hispanic, making up 37.4%.

== See also ==
- Neighborhoods of Long Beach, California
- Cambodia Town, Long Beach, California
- Zaferia, Long Beach, California
