= Koreatown, Garden Grove =

Business district in California, U.S.

Coordinates: 33.77°N 117.96°W

Koreatown
- Neighborhood
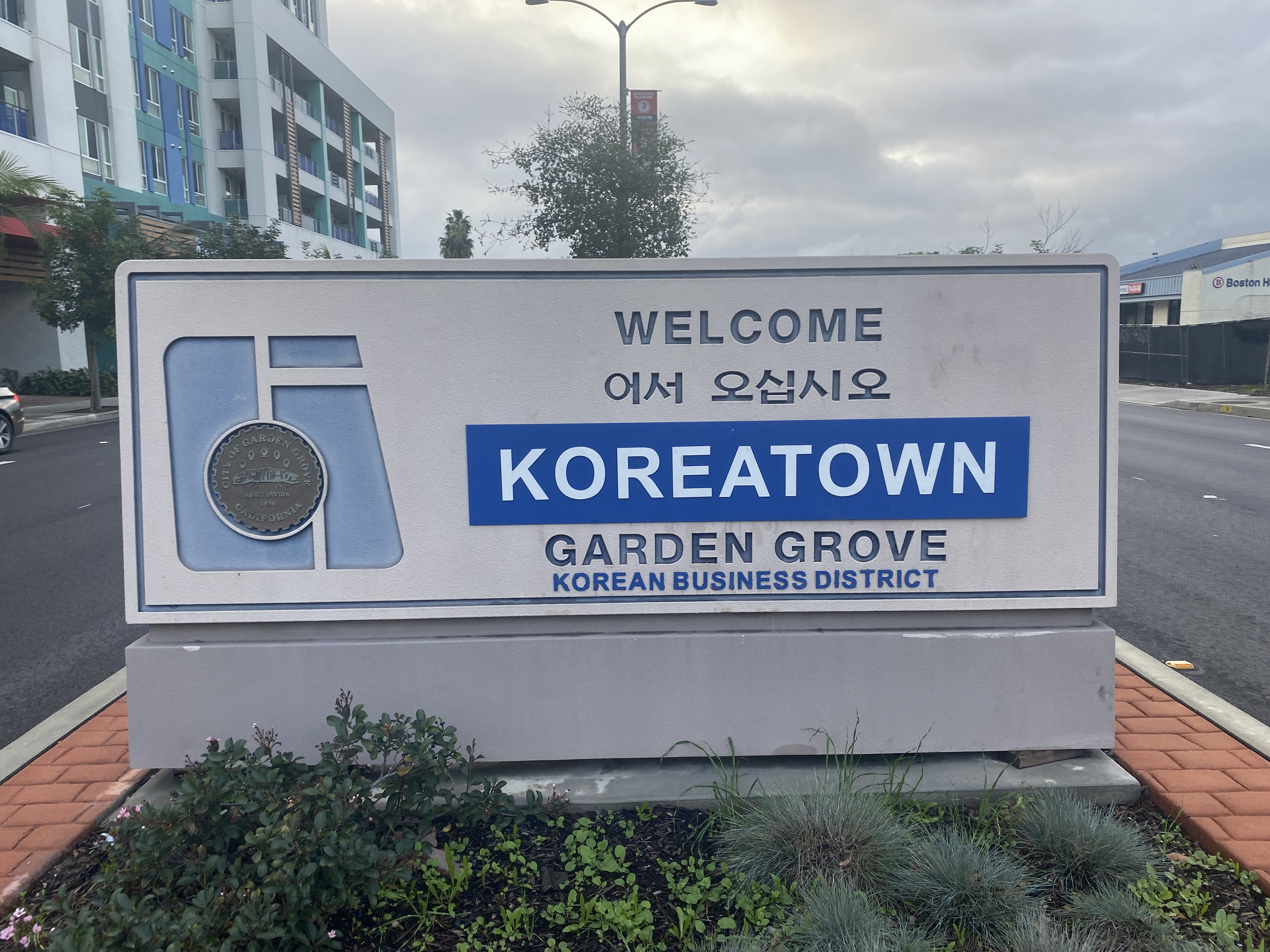
- Welcome sign marking the entrance to Koreatown in Garden Grove, California
- Interactive map of Koreatown
- Country: United States
- State: California
- County: Orange
- Cities: Garden Grove

Koreatown is a Korean American business district on Garden Grove Boulevard between Beach Boulevard and Brookhurst Street in Garden Grove, Orange County, California. The Los Angeles Times has called it the "cultural center of Orange County's Korean community".

== Geography ==
The enclave exists in a 2-mile stretch of Garden Grove Blvd from Beach Blvd to Brookhurst St. According to Garden Grove councilman Ho Chung, Koreans set up their businesses in Garden Grove Blvd due to an influx of empty storefronts and cheap rent.

== History ==
=== Origin ===
In 1955, Sammy Lee, a Korean War veteran and Olympic champion diver, was told a house he attempted to purchase in Garden Grove could not be sold to nonwhites. After outrage over the incident occurred, Lee was offered a different home in the city. Hence, Korean immigrants, who arrived in larger quantities after the Immigration and Nationality Act of 1965, gravitated toward the city of Garden Grove. From 1982 to 1992, the Korean American population in Orange County tripled, mostly being concentrated in the city of Garden Grove.

=== 1992 Los Angeles riots ===
After the 1992 Los Angeles riots occurred, about 2000 people protested the government's responses to the riots in the parking lot of Kyung Dong Plaza. The riots led to much damage in Koreatown, Los Angeles, affecting many Garden Grove residents who had relatives, friends, or business conduct in the region. Furthermore, many Korean Americans from Los Angeles migrated to Orange County, contributing to the growth of Garden Grove's Koreatown. Ultimately, the 1992 race riots more than doubled the number of Korean Americans in Orange County, which had been recorded by the census as 37,000 in 1990.

=== Subsequent developments ===
In the 1990s, many Korean residents from Garden Grove diffused further into other Orange County cities such as in Irvine, Buena Park, and Fullerton, seeking safer neighborhoods or better schools. Despite this, many Koreans continued to shop and socialize in Garden Grove as late as 1999. However, local developments in Buena Park, such as a Super 1 Mart in September 1999 and The Source OC in 2016, have drawn Korean customers away from Garden Grove.

In 2019, the city council of Garden Grove voted to rename the business district to “Orange County Koreatown".

The area was affected by the Garden Grove chemical leak in 2026, with many homes and businesses in the vicinity of the GKN Aerospace plant being in Koreatown.

== Economy ==
There are a number of Korean businesses such as markets, restaurants, churches, doctors, and immigration services, primarily housed within strip malls. In 1999, there were 1,300 Korean-owned businesses in Garden Grove, with roughly 900 of them along Garden Grove Blvd.

== See also ==
- Little Saigon, Orange County
- Little Arabia
