= Pizza Studio =

American pizza franchise

- Company type: Private
- Industry: Restaurants
- Founded: 2013; 13 years ago
- Headquarters: Los Angeles
- Number of locations: U.S.: 15; Philippines: 1 Canada: 8 Brazil: 2
- Area served: United States; Brazil; Canada; Philippines
- Website: pizzastudio.com

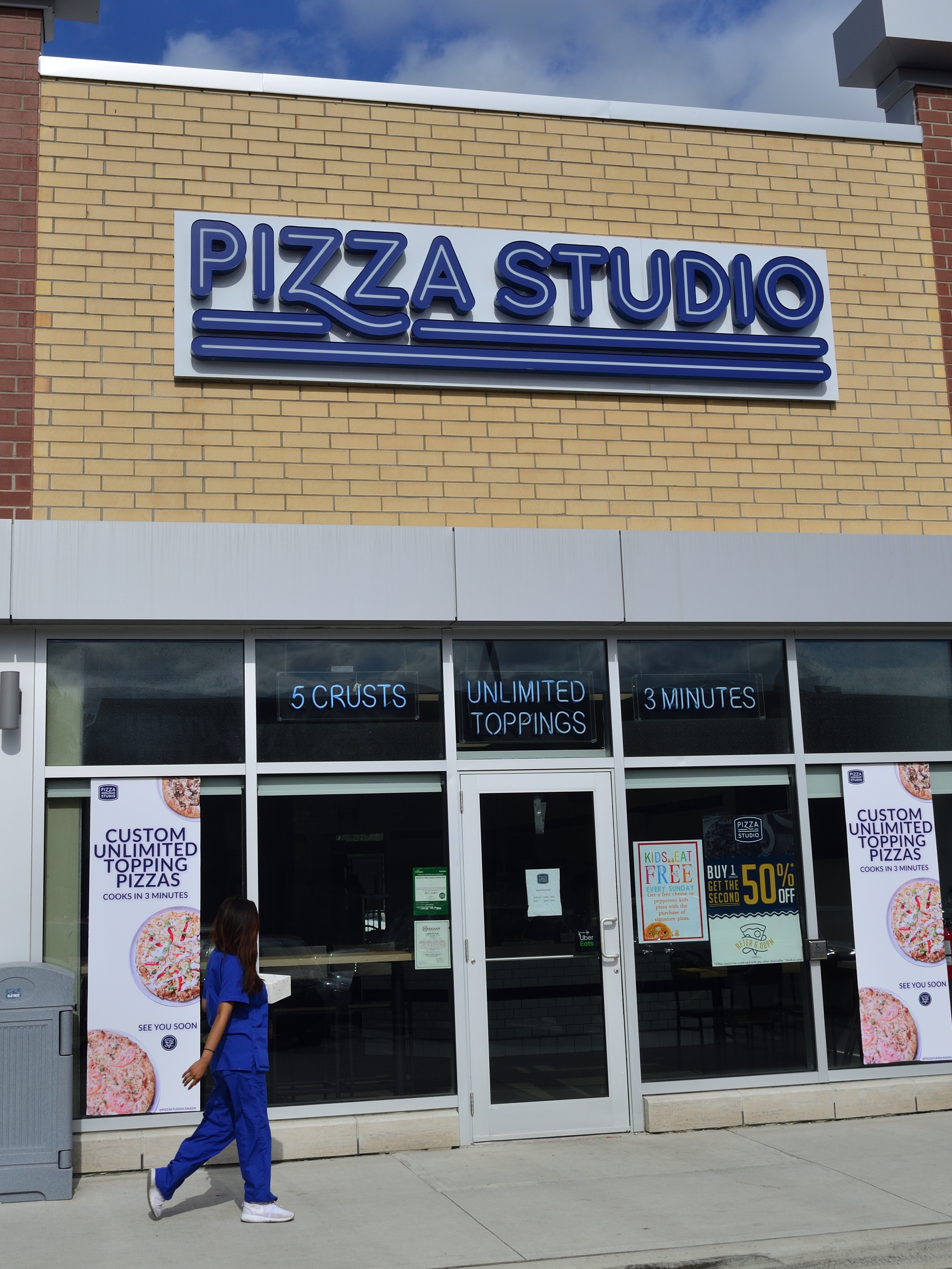
Pizza Studio in Ontario

Pizza Studio is a Los Angeles–based pizza franchise founded in 2013 by entrepreneur and former venture capitalist, Samit Varma. The fast-casual concept allows diners to create their own pizzas using four types of dough and a number of vegetables, meats, and cheeses that employees help put together in front of the customer. The pizzas are cooked in about three minutes in a self-ventilating conveyor oven.

The chain currently has stores in Arizona, New York, Kansas, Utah and California, with over 250 others in development throughout the United States.

Their first branch in Asia opened at the Uptown Parade of Bonifacio Global City in the Philippines. Exclusive Filipino cuisine pizza flavors were introduced like Sisig and Chicken Inasal.
