= Taiwanese Americans in Los Angeles =

There is a large Taiwanese and Taiwanese American community in the Greater Los Angeles Area. The Los Angeles-Long Beach-Santa Ana metropolitan area had a Taiwanese population of 83,294 as of 2008. At 24.3% of the total Taiwanese-American population, the Taiwanese community in Greater Los Angeles represents the largest Taiwanese community in the United States.

== History ==
Taiwanese immigration to the United States was limited in the years before World War II, due to Japanese rule as well as the Immigration Act of 1924, which completely barred immigration from Asia. From World War II to 1965, a small number of students studied throughout the United States. After the passage of the Immigration and Nationality Act of 1965, which loosened restrictions and gave preference to skilled workers, many came as students and stayed, partly due to better economic conditions in the U.S. and due to a repressive political climate back home.

Many Taiwanese settled in the suburbs, notably Monterey Park, which eventually became known as “Little Taipei”, in no small part due to real estate developer Frederic Hsieh. In 1970, two years before Hsieh bought his first property, Monterey Park, whom he billed as the “Chinese Beverly Hills” was only 15 percent Asian, of which most were Japanese. Hsieh used a variety of methods to promote Monterey Park to the new immigrants from Taiwan, such as highlighting the city's telephone area code 818—the number 8 being considered lucky in Chinese culture—and Monterey Park’s high-achieving schools. By 1994, of the destinations listed by Chinese immigrants, Monterey Park, Alhambra, and Rosemead were among the top six most popular. By 1996, at least two-thirds of Monterey Park's 5,000 businesses were owned by people with Taiwanese or Hong Kong origins, and Monterey Park had a Chinese mayor and a predominantly Asian city council. The demographic change brought tension to the community, to the point where a local gas station displayed a sign that said: "Will the last American to leave Monterey Park please bring the flag?," and the city council debated whether to make English the official language and force businesses to put up English language signs. However, tensions eventually abated.

Later, growth slowed as many wealthier Taiwanese moved farther out to the San Gabriel Valley in the east and Orange County in the south. Immigration slowed in the late 1980s and 1990s due to the 1987 lifting of martial law and a rising economy. Fewer students were studying in the United States and of those who did, fewer were staying in the United States.

== Geography ==
Most immigrants settled not in the older, Cantonese-speaking Chinatown but in suburbs such as Monterey Park, known as one of the first suburban Chinatowns and as the cultural capital of the Taiwanese community in Greater LA.

Asians eventually moved out to more affluent communities in the San Gabriel Valley and have become the majority or a significant part in these cities, including San Marino, Arcadia, Walnut, Diamond Bar, Hacienda Heights, Rowland Heights, and others.

== Demographics ==
Rank	City	Taiwanese-Americans Alone or in Combination (2024 ACS estimate)
1	Los Angeles	10,367
2	Irvine	7,805
3	Arcadia	3,487
4	Rowland Heights	2,501
5	Chino Hills	2,293
6	Diamond Bar	2,189
7	Hacienda Heights	2,171
8	Walnut	1,626
9	Cerritos	1,591
10	Torrance	1,430

In 2014, the Taiwanese population was 45,808 in Los Angeles County, 0.5% of the total county population, and 83,294 in the Los Angeles-Santa Ana Metropolitan Area. More Taiwanese live in California than in any other state as well, with around 49% residing in California. About 71% of Taiwanese immigrants in 2008 were adults of working age, and Taiwanese immigrant women outnumbered men 54.6 percent to 45.4 percent compared to 49.8 percent women and 50.2 percent men for all immigrants. 90.5% of children living with Taiwanese immigrant parents are native born as well.

== Economy ==
The state of California is the 7th largest exporter of goods to Taiwan. Chapters of the Taipei Economic and Cultural Representative Office and the Taiwanese American Chamber of Commerce exist in the area to promote steady trade relationships with the United States.

A majority of Taiwanese-born men reported working in management, business, and finance; information technology; and sciences and engineering, and more than a quarter of employed Taiwanese-born women reported working in management, business, and finance. Taiwanese immigrants were less likely to live in poverty, with a rate of 20.4% than both natives (28.7%) and the foreign born(37.9%) overall (Note: the Migration Policy Institute defines poverty as individuals residing in families with total annual income of less than 200 percent of the federal poverty line). Taiwanese immigrants were more likely to own their own home than both the native born and other immigrants, and just under 90% Taiwanese immigrants had health insurance in 2008.

== Education ==
Of Taiwanese-born adults, more than 70 percent had at least a bachelor's degree, compared to 28 and 27 percent of the foreign born and native-born adult populations, respectively.

== Transportation ==
The Taiwanese airline China Airlines operates a bus service from Los Angeles International Airport to Monterey Park and Rowland Heights.

== Culture and recreation ==
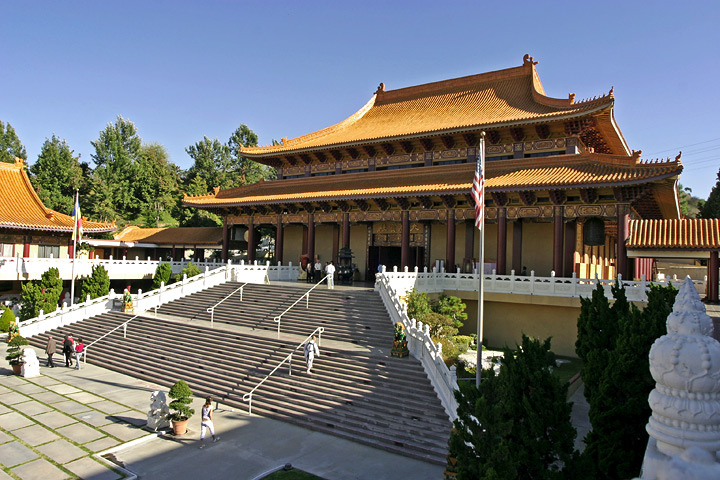
Hsi Lai Temple

There are several Taiwanese organizations, such as the Formosan Association for Public Affairs and the Taiwan Center of Greater Los Angeles, that have chapters in and around the city of Los Angeles. Hsi Lai Temple, one of the largest Buddhist monasteries in North America, is located in the eastern Los Angeles County city of Hacienda Heights. There are many storefronts that advertise Chinese herbs and restaurant supplies, and acupuncture or brokerage services. A boba, or bubble tea, shop is located in almost every one of San Gabriel Valley’s hundreds of strip malls.
