= Indian Alley =

Alley in Skid Row, Los Angeles, California, United States

Indian Alley is the unofficial name given to a stretch of alley in the Skid Row area of downtown Los Angeles, so designated for the significance the area held for indigent American Indians from the 1930s to the 1990s. Since 2011 the alley has become a notable site for Los Angeles street art hosting murals and sculpture that commemorate its historical significance to Skid Row's American Indian community.

== History ==
Referred to as “one of the most famous public spaces in the country” among Native Americans, the tiny street (officially named Werdin Place) lay adjacent to United American Indian Involvement, Inc. (UAII), an outreach center for American Indians that became an important locus for social, spiritual, political and rehabilitative activities for the community. Established in 1974, UAII provided health and support services to Los Angeles’ Native American population, initially focused primarily on recovery services for those addicted to drugs and alcohol. During this time, Los Angeles was estimated to have the largest Native American population—anywhere from 40,000 to 100,000—of any city in the United States, with over 100 federally recognized tribes represented within LA county. In addition to its offices, the organization’s facility included dormitories that became de facto residences for many displaced Indians. UAII anchored the block at 118 Winston Street, at the alley’s northeast corner with Winston Street, until it moved to its new location at 1125 West 6th Street in the 1990s.

Indian Alley comprises a block of Werdin Place, running south from Winston Street to East 5th Street. It is bounded to the west by Main Street and to the east by Los Angeles Street. The site has appeared as a location in numerous movies and television shows, including The Sting, Baretta, Hill Street Blues, Police Story, Quincy, M.E. and Starsky & Hutch.

== Indian Alley Art Project ==
In recent years Indian Alley’s heritage has been resurrected and commemorated through a series of murals and other public art installations in and around Werdin Place and Winston Street. Through the coordination of Stephen Zeigler and 118 Winston, an art gallery and yoga studio occupying the former UAII site, paintings and sculpture by prominent Los Angeles street artists depicting noteworthy Native American leaders and social activists have made Indian Alley a significant site for Los Angeles street art. When Zeigler and his wife moved into the space in 2008, he made a habit of cleaning the space in and around the alley, which was then commonly used for drug dealing and prostitution. Zeigler developed an interest in the history of the site; his research revealed the block’s former significance to Los Angeles' American Indian population as well as its more common name, Indian Alley.

In 2011 Zeigler began recruiting local street artists to install murals in the alley, with the express purpose of highlighting the special heritage of the place. Murals and sculpture selected for their relevance to Indian Alley’s history include portraits of local Native American activist Robert Sundance and eighteenth-century California anticolonialist Toypurina, along with Native American symbols and more abstract pieces and positive social messaging. Contributors to the ongoing art project include Maya/Nahuatl artist Votan and Jemez Pueblo Indian Jaque Fragua, local artists Wild Life (American artist), Bandit, Sketchy, Gabette, Free Humanity, Random Act and Teacher, as well as street art notable Shepard Fairey.

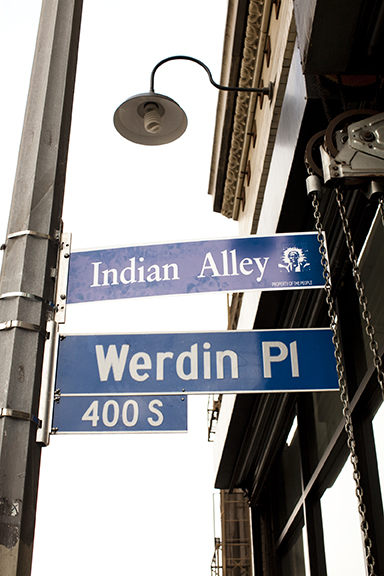
This official looking city sign was installed by a street artist in 2011

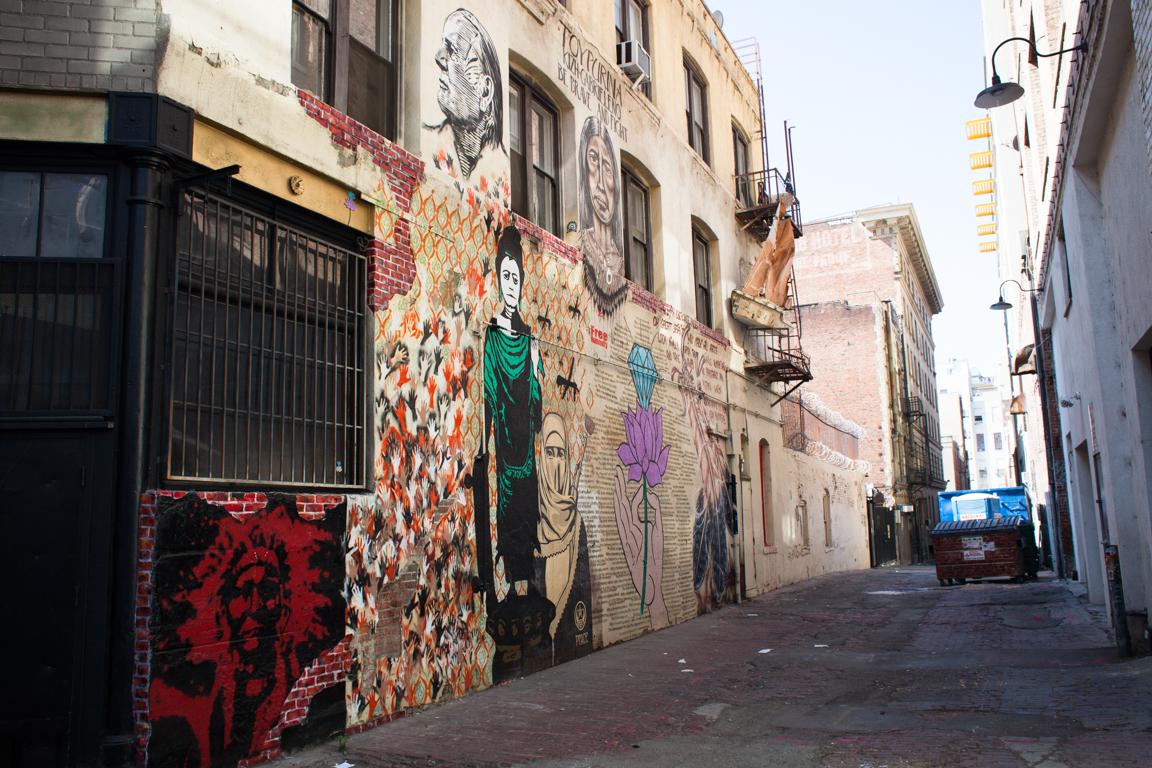
Looking south from Winston St
