= Little Bangladesh, Los Angeles =

Little Bangladesh
- Neighborhood of Los Angeles
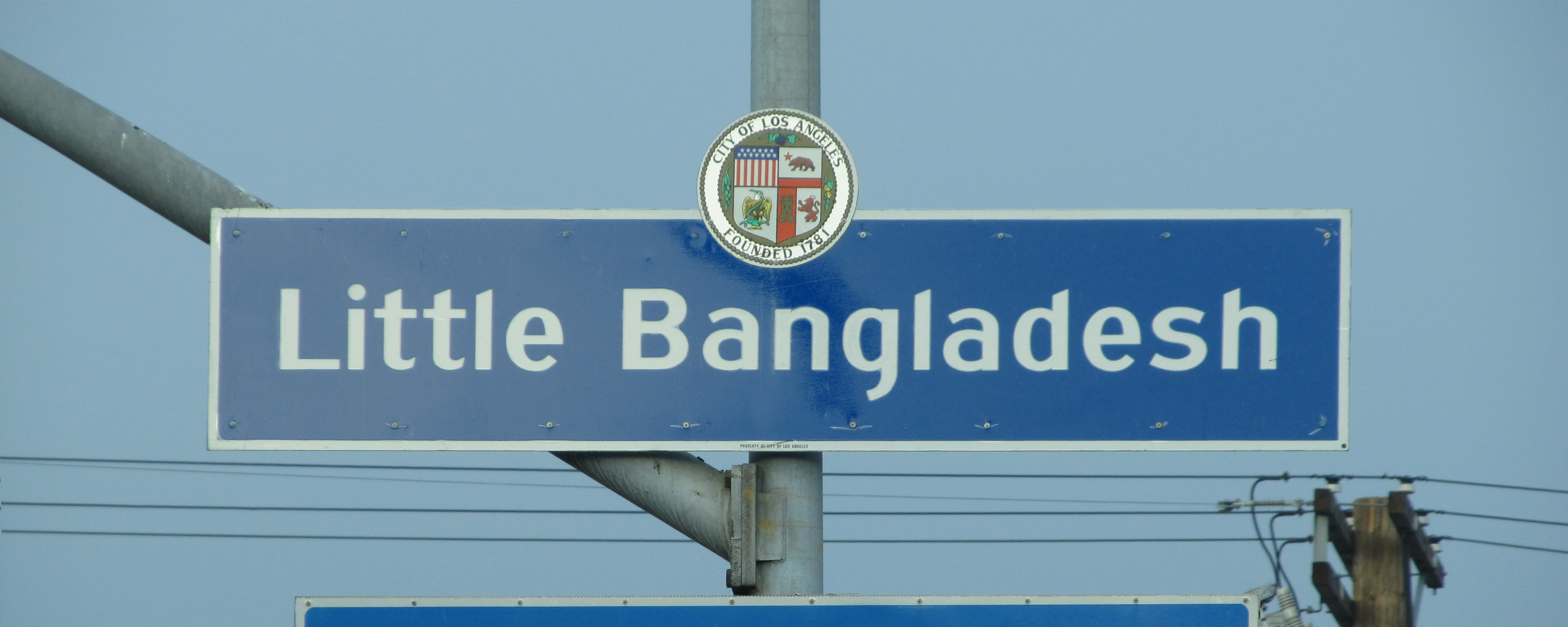
- Little Bangladesh neighborhood sign located at the intersection of New Hampshire and Third Street

- Location within Central Los Angeles
- Coordinates: 34.0690°N 118.2979°W
- Country: United States
- State: California
- County: Los Angeles
- City: Los Angeles
- Time zone: UTC-8 (PST)
  - Summer (DST): UTC-7 (PDT)

Little Bangladesh (Bengali: লিটল বাংলাদেশ) is a neighborhood in Central Los Angeles, California, United States.

== History ==
Little Bangladesh was officially designated by the City of Los Angeles in 2010. It is the cultural and culinary hub of L.A.'s Bangladeshi community.

Designation of the neighborhood as “Little Bangladesh” caused some friction with some Korean-Americans in Los Angeles, who wanted the area named as a part of Koreatown. In 2009, City Councilman Tom LaBonge opposed the neighborhood designation, and instead suggested the community erect a statue at a local park and consider neighborhood designation sometime in the future. After neighborhood leaders organized residents for more than a year to lobby the Los Angeles City Council, Little Bangladesh received its official designation in 2010. Signage marking the area was installed in 2011.

== Geography ==
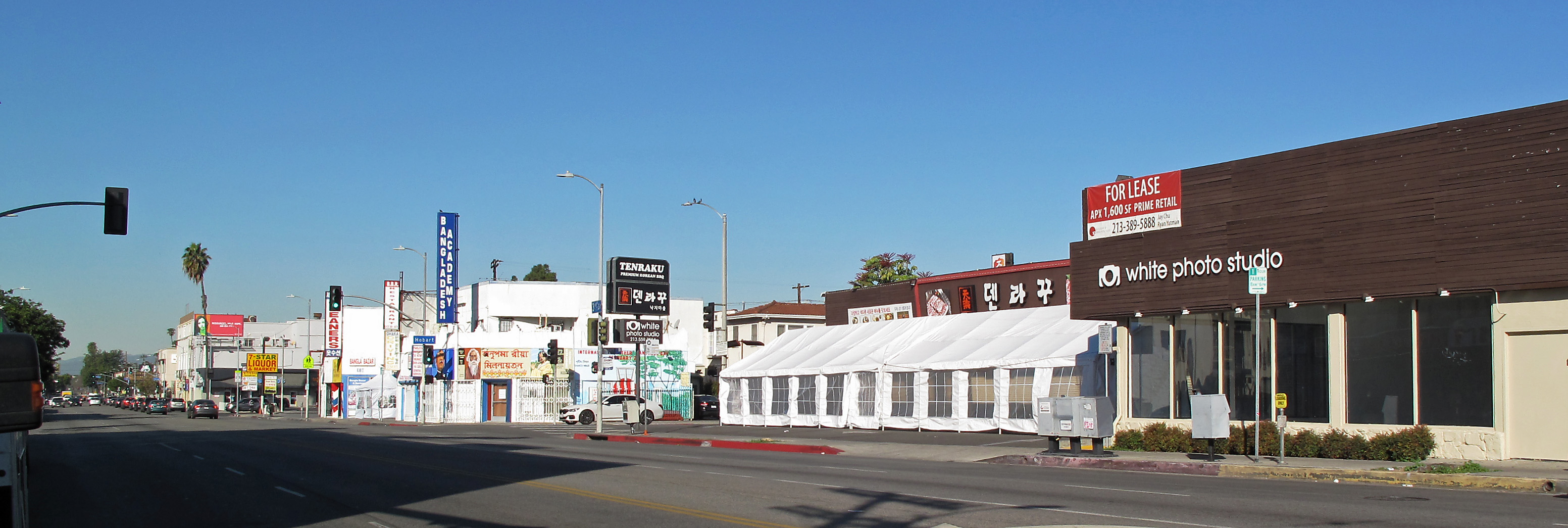
North side of 3rd St., in Little Bangladesh

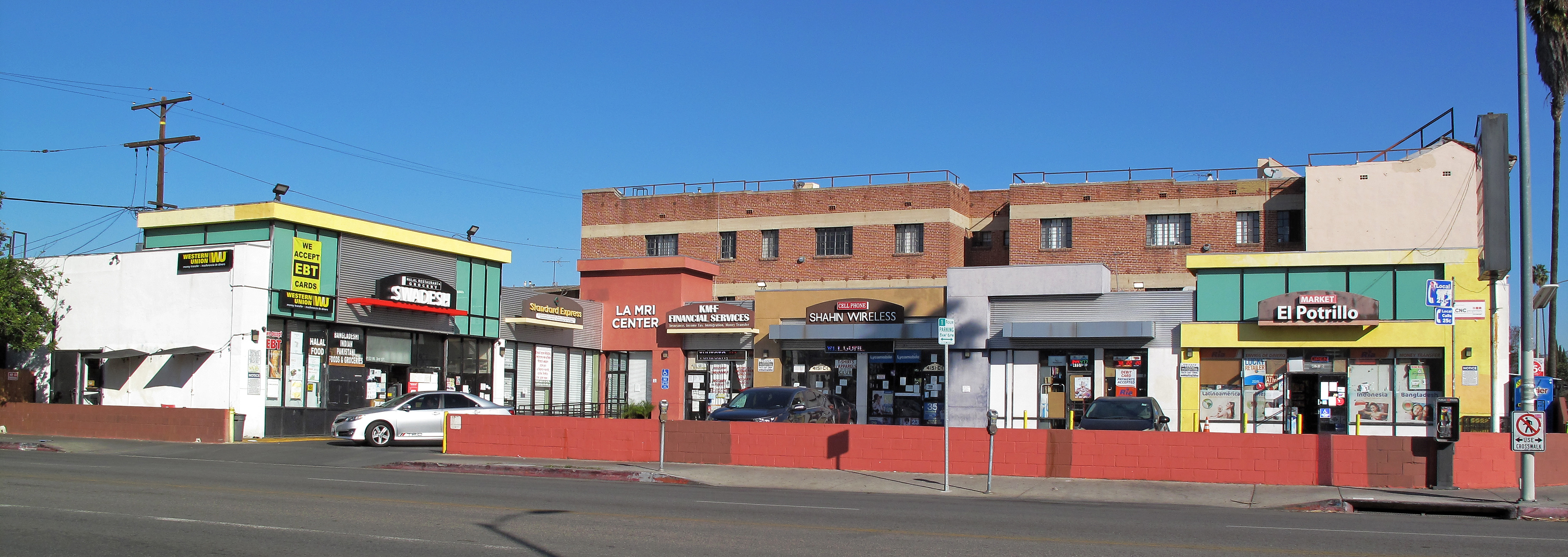
Minimall on 3rd St.

Little Bangladesh is a four-block area along 3rd Street between Alexandria and New Hampshire Avenues. It is a tree-lined residential community that also includes restaurants, shops and art galleries. The neighborhood is surrounded by Koreatown.

== Demographics ==
The 2000 census showed a Bangladeshi population of 1,700 in Los Angeles County. In 2010, the South Asian Network, a cultural and advocacy group with an office nearby, estimated the Bangladeshi population in the area at more than 20,000, based on a community mapping project it did in 2005. Community leaders have identified the area as having a lower- to middle-income population.

== Infrastructure ==
West 3rd Street, the main street and center of the neighborhood, is a significant east-west thoroughfare in Wilshire Center and the rest of Central Los Angeles. Within the official boundaries, smaller residential streets intersect 3rd Street forming five intersections from one end of the neighborhood to the other, four of which have pedestrian crossings, excluding South Berendo Street. There is no designated bicycle infrastructure on 3rd Street itself, but Los Angeles Metro does operate a bike share station on Kenmore and 3rd, with 12 docks.

Los Angeles Metro operates Metro Bus local line 16 on 3rd with stops within the neighborhood's official boundaries on Alexandria, Catalina and New Hampshire. Metro also operates local line 204 and rapid line 754 which run on Vermont Avenue which provide nearby access to the neighborhood from the stops on 3rd and Vermont. 3rd Street also lies between Metro Red Line stations on Wilshire and Vermont and Vermont and Beverly.

== See also ==
- The South Asian Network - advocacy group established in 1990
- Little Bangladesh website
