= Cambodia Town, Long Beach, California =

Neighborhood in Long Beach, California, United States

Coordinates: 33.7900°N 118.1689°W

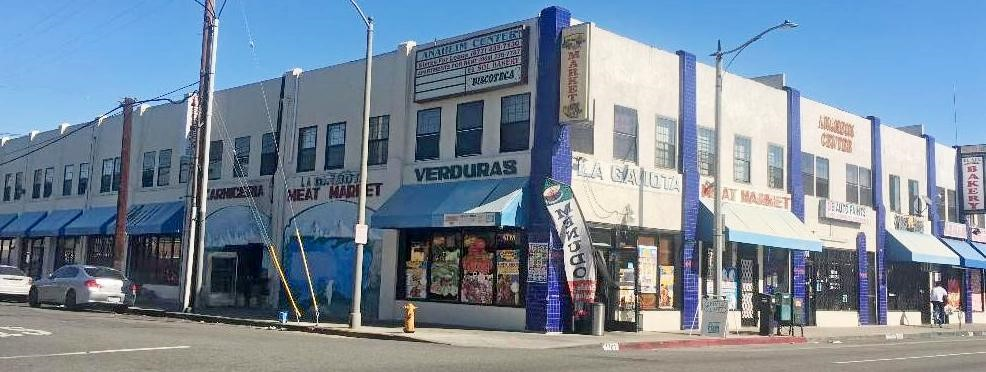
Latino-owned and Cambodian-owned businesses, 2018

Cambodia Town (also known as Little Phnom Penh or Little Cambodia) is the official name for a business corridor along Anaheim Street between Atlantic and Junipero avenues in the Eastside of Long Beach, California. The area has numerous Cambodian restaurants, clothing stores, jewelry stores, and donut shops, as well as churches, Khmer temples, and service centers for Cambodian Americans. There are many other businesses in the area, such as auto repair shops, which are Cambodian-owned. Long Beach has the largest concentration of Cambodians of any city outside of Southeast Asia.

== Pre-migration ==
Prior to the rise of the Khmer Rouge in the 1970s, Cambodia was a highly agricultural society that endured ninety years of French colonial rule. In 1973, the United States commissioned the Arclight missions. This was a series of bombings targeting the Cambodia-Vietnam border to fight the threat of communism from Vietnam. However, the bombings instead instilled chaos and fear in the civilians of Southeast Asia including Cambodia. These bombings convinced many Cambodians that establishing the Khmer Rouge and a new political system would solve all of their problems. Pol Pot led the Khmer Rouge as a communist group who sought to remove all Western influence in Cambodia and create an equal, agricultural society.

The Khmer Rouge was able to capture and destroy the old capital city of Oudong in March 1974. This then led to the Khmer Rouge's next action of forcing the city's 20,000 inhabitants into the countryside. The Khmer Rouge formally took control of Cambodia on April 17, 1975, around the time of Cambodian New Year. Cambodia then turned into a classless, institution-less society that forced people to work 12 to 14 hours a day in the labor camps on the countryside.

Shortly after taking over the country, the Khmer Rouge clubbed individuals who showed disagreement towards their regime to a painful death. The Khmer Rouge murdered Cambodians for not working hard enough, showing any signs of grief, or being educated. As a result, the Khmer Rouge killed 300,000 to 500,000 Cambodians. The Vietnamese removed the Khmer Rouge from power in 1979. During this political turmoil, the death toll is estimated to be 2 million out of 8 million people in Cambodia or a quarter of the total population.

== Waves of migration to Cambodia Town ==
In the 1950s and 1960s, the earliest Cambodians to reside in Long Beach were Cambodian students who attended California State University, Long Beach, as part of an exchange program. These students were from wealthy and educated families in Cambodia. A few of these students permanently settled in Long Beach after graduating from college and planted the seeds for a Cambodian presence there. Consequently, the next wave of migration occurred in the mid-1970s with those who escaped when the Khmer Rouge first took over Cambodia.

The last wave of Cambodian arrivals to the U.S. occurred under the Refugee Act of the 1980s, which was after the Vietnamese attacked the Khmer Rouge in 1979. These were mostly farmers from small villages with limited educational backgrounds. These refugees came to America to avoid fear and violence imposed on them as part of the war and genocide. The Cambodian students who had settled in Long Beach in the 1950s and 1960s provided services, such as mental health resources, to assist refugees with adjustment to American society. Overall, these Cambodian refugees came to settle in Long Beach to build a new Cambodian community that was destroyed by violence. Long Beach became a destination that allowed many refugees to start their own businesses and establish cultural legacies due to its affordable property.

== Demographics ==
As Cambodian refugees arrived in Long Beach, the Asian population increased between 1980 and 1990. By 1990, the Asian population in Cambodia Town was about 35 percent and has declined since then. According to the 2010 census, Hispanics composed the majority of all ethnic groups while Asians composed 20 percent, 70 percent of whom identified as Cambodian.

Over half of the Asians of Cambodia Town are foreign born, and 60 percent of those are US citizens. This process and the rate of naturalization indicates that the community is assimilating into American society.

== Resettlement ==
From April to November 1975, approximately 2,000 Cambodians migrated to Camp Pendleton, a military base in Southern California, for refuge. After their time in this resettlement camp, many Cambodian refugees moved to Cambodia Town, Long Beach in search of support, as well as familiar lifestyle and culture.

Through this process of adjusting to American society, many struggled with various challenges including language barriers, trauma, and violence. Trauma is a highly prevalent issue in the community due to the violence inflicted on Cambodians by the Khmer Rouge. Many Cambodians in Cambodia Town struggled emotionally by having more anxiety and fear in their daily activities because of this trauma, not just the civil war, but also the effects of Year Zero that has been declared by Angkar (Organization), a powerful ruling body that controlled most of its population. These individuals dealt with insomnia, nightmares, panic attacks, and headaches due to painful memories from the political turmoil between the Cambodian Civil War and the infamous Khmer Rouge led by Pol Pot and Khieu Samphan in Cambodia, following the Fall of Phnom Penh in 1975. After the Vietnamese invasion of Cambodia began on Christmas Day in 1978 declared by Lê Duẩn, the leader of unified Vietnam to capture Phnom Penh which defeated Angkar and its Khmer Rouge cadres which forced Pol Pot and others to retreat back into the jungle located in Anlong Veng near the border of Thailand from 1979 until 1997.

Intergenerational trauma contributes to behavioral problems during the adolescent years of Cambodian youth. These problems impact the family dynamic by widening the generation gap between parent and child. As a result, unaddressed past trauma links to various issues, which may intensify the violence within the Cambodian community in Long Beach.

Cambodians received the opportunity to rebuild their lives and community when they came to Long Beach. At the time, Long Beach had many jobs that did not require English proficiency, which granted Cambodians a higher access to work and income. Additionally, cheap and affordable property allowed a few Cambodian refugees to gather funds within their immediate and extended family to establish small businesses, cultural institutions, and homes. The United Cambodian Community (UCC) formed during this time to assist Cambodian refugees with housing, finance, and food. These structures and services helped shape the geographic landscape of the local Cambodian community by creating familiar food, pharmacy, and other stores for Cambodians. For example, pharmacies in Cambodia Town provided traditional herbal medicine from Cambodia.

Cambodia Town's population grew with services, stores, and migration. This population growth created a local network where Cambodian residents could navigate their daily lives while still using Khmer as their dominant language. East Anaheim Street became the main business corridor for these services, restaurants, and resources for Cambodians in Long Beach.

== Official designation ==
The initial proposal of designating Cambodia Town in 2000 was rejected because many local residents did not support it. The plan was first brought up by a group of Cambodians who "don't live here," leaving the impression that Cambodians who did not live in the area were trying to claim the space as their own. Thus, some community activists preferred the name Little Phnom Penh because the name does not impose a "singular national identity" unlike how the name Cambodia Town implies. Some community members continued questioning any official designation for the area because Long Beach is ethnically diverse. Official recognition for a single ethnic group would reinforce racial tensions between Cambodian and Latino youth that stemmed from cultural differences and social isolation.

The founders of Cambodia Town, Inc. led a successful attempt to officially designate East Anaheim Street as Cambodia Town. Their attempt included the crucial step of gathering support from community and major stakeholders along East Anaheim Street. The proposal received the unanimous approval by the Housing and Neighborhoods Committee despite dissent and concerns that other minority groups had in regards of being displaced. Community members argued that the designation would not displace other ethnic groups by stating that "such designations merely call attention to a neighborhood's unique characteristics". The advocates for the designation also used other established ethnic enclaves as examples of spaces where Asians, Blacks, Hispanics and Whites were able to live and work together. As a result, the Long Beach City Council unanimously approved the concept of Cambodia Town in 2007 – under the condition that it became a Business Improvement District (BID).

== Racial tensions ==
Many Latino community members felt intimidated and threatened by the rapid growth of the Cambodian community. Cambodians became increasingly "confronted by the ethnic racial hierarchy" that arises in low-income communities due to the lack of resources. Cambodian gangs began forming as a method of resiliency. Young Cambodians gravitated towards gangs in hopes to reconcile their conflicting American and Cambodian identities. The lack of educational support within the Long Beach school system for Cambodians also contributed towards high rates of gang participation. In addition, gang participation also correlates to mental health because unaddressed intergenerational trauma among Cambodian youth caused many to search for support from gangs as a coping mechanism; 67 percent of Cambodians suffer from post-traumatic stress disorder, while 51 percent suffer from severe depression.

Gang activity in Long Beach and Cambodia Town was most active from 1989 to 1995, through street fights, drive-by shootings and killings. In America by the Numbers Pass or Fail in Cambodia Town, one of the interviewees stated that "we had to protect ourselves," when talking about the difficulties of growing up in the United States. In a survey conducted in Cambodia Town, more than half of the participants reported public safety as a major concern. Many of these respondents cited gang activity, theft, violence, and substance abuse as issues that their families continually encountered. However, rates of crime and violence have decreased in the community in recent years. Various community-based organizations such as UCC consistently reach out to the younger generations to guide them towards academic attainment.

== Cambodian culture ==
The Cambodian New Year takes place annually from April 14 to April 16. In Cambodia, Choul Chnam Thmey traditionally signifies the shift from the height of the hot, dry season to the monsoon rains that will wash away the dust and bring nourishment to the fields. This transformation is said to be accompanied by divine beings, known as Tevoda, who migrate in a cycle to watch over the renewal in nature.

The Cambodian New Year festival in Cambodia Town is a community gathering in the streets and features a cultural parade. This celebration showcases traditional garments and performances (e.g. classical dancing and drumming), flags and symbols of Cambodian cultural pride, and representatives of local organizations and businesses. Additionally, the celebration exhibits the ethnic diversity of the enclave as the event often includes monks, Cambodian and Black Christian ministers, and paleta vendors.

Another well-known local event is the annual Cambodia Town Film Festival which was founded by Cambodian American filmmaker Caylee So and hip-hop artist praCH Ly. The event features films from both established and emerging filmmakers whose works deal with the Cambodian experience. The festival includes screenings, discussions, and question-and-answer sessions with those who were involved in the film productions.

== Businesses ==
The Cambodia Town business corridor outlines roughly the 1.2 mile stretch of East Anaheim Street just north of Downtown Long Beach and east of the 710 freeway. This location is accessible by the Long Beach Transit bus system and the Los Angeles Metro A Line. The area consists of Cambodian liquor stores, gift shops, jewelry stores, markets, and restaurants. The area also consists of many Latino-owned businesses and restaurants.

One of the most well-known Cambodia Town restaurants is Phnom Penh Noodle Shack, established in 1985. Phnom Penh Noodle Shack started as a modest, family-run restaurant, but over the years has garnered mass appeal from food critic reviews and social media.

The markets within Cambodia Town reflect the diversity of Asian ethnicities in Long Beach and carry key ingredients for a variety of cuisines including Khmer, Vietnamese, Thai, Korean, Japanese, and Chinese food. The stores provide ethnic foods ranging from ready-made Asian meals to cooking ingredients.

== Education ==
Cambodia Town's high poverty rate is partially due to low employment rates caused by language barriers and low educational attainment. In the United States, 54 percent of Asians hold a bachelor's degree, while only 10 percent of Asians in Cambodia Town hold a bachelor's degree. About 43 percent of Cambodians reported to having attended college but not earning a degree, thus implying high drop-out rates. In the United States, less than one-third of Cambodians hold less than a high school degree. Data aggregation consolidates the Cambodian experience with the general Asian population's experiences. Because rates of Asian educational attainment are so high, the low educational attainment of Cambodians is ignored. Cambodian youth are not provided the necessary resources, such as counseling or tutoring, to address specific issues that pertain to the Cambodian community.

== Poverty ==
Due to resettlement, the Cambodian community is currently facing many challenges such as trauma and poverty. Poverty imposes stress on individuals, which creates individual trauma such as having financial insecurity. The complexity and interconnections of these issues contributes to the cycle of poverty and violence by hindering economic mobility. Poverty imposes a challenge for social mobility because other challenges build upon poverty such as educational attainment. The median household income in Cambodia Town is $34,000, which is lower than the $56,000 median income for Los Angeles County. Moreover, Asians in Cambodia Town on average earn roughly $14,600 less than Asians in Los Angeles County. Additionally, one-third of all residents live below the poverty line – about two times higher than that of Los Angeles County.

Income and poverty are both interconnected with employment outcomes such as having labor force participation rate around 34 percent in Cambodia Town. Consequently, Cambodia Town has an unemployment rate of 15 percent.

== Housing ==
Few households own a home in Cambodia Town, which highlights the high renter-occupied numbers and the lack of home opportunities. About 61 percent of Cambodia Town residents are renters. Most resident are low-income, which causes many to devote most of their time and income to rent. Individuals with a high rent burden are described as any renters who dedicate more than 30 percent of their income to paying rent; in Cambodia Town, 62 percent of renters have a high rent burden. This prevalence of poverty and inability to purchase homes within the Cambodia Town community may be due to low levels of educational attainment, which can inhibit the ability to attain high-paying jobs. As a result, displacement and gentrification are becoming prevalent issues within the community.

Cambodia Town is currently undergoing many beautification projects with public investment in murals, bike lanes, parks, and community gardens, among others. This method of beautification is part of an effort to increase safety within the local community. Although beautification does promote safety, it also increases property values, which imposes a new challenge for locals such as a higher cost of living. Consequently, businesses and residents are at risk of being displaced if rent becomes too high. Taken alongside gentrification, beautification creates dissent from housing community development organizations. These groups petition for policies to protect residents from continually increasing rent.

== In Culture ==
Racial tensions between the Cambodian diaspora and other ethnic groups of Long Beach are depicted in the film Freedom Writers.

== See also ==
- Little Cambodia
- Cambodian Americans
- Khmer people

== Further reading and viewing ==
- "ទីក្រុងខ្មែរ «Cambodia Town» ត្រូវបានបង្កើតនៅលើទឹកដីសហរដ្ឋអាមេរិកក្នុងក្រុងឡងប៊ិច រដ្ឋកាលីហ្វ័រនីញ៉ា." (Archive) Koh Santepheap Daily.
- Needham, Susan; Quintiliani, Karen (2008). Cambodians in Long Beach (Images of America ed.). Charleston, S.C.: Arcadia Publishing. ISBN 978-0738556239.
- Visiting... with Huell Howser Episode 902 (2001)
