= Sherman Village, Los Angeles =

Sherman Village
- Neighborhood of Los Angeles
- Location within Los Angeles and San Fernando Valley Sherman Village (the Los Angeles metropolitan area)
- Coordinates: 34.15926°N 118.41283°W
- Country: United States
- State: California
- City: Los Angeles
- Named for: Moses Sherman

Sherman Village is a neighborhood in the San Fernando Valley region of Los Angeles, California.
