= Little Arabia =

- Ethnic enclave
- Nickname: Little Gaza
- Location within Anaheim, California Location within southern California Location within California Location within the United States
- Coordinates: 33°49′30″N 117°57′32″W
- Country: United States
- State: California
- County: Orange County
- City: Anaheim
- Time zone: UTC-8
  - Summer (DST): UTC-7
- ZIP: 92804
- Area codes: 714 and 657

Little Arabia is an ethnic enclave in western Anaheim, California, the center for Orange County's Arab Americans, who number more than 24,000 (As of 2000). It has been referred to as "Little Gaza" which was a riff on the nearby Garza Island neighborhoods. Little Arabia grew significantly in the 1990s with the arrival of immigrants from the Middle East, and is the home to thousands of Arab Americans predominantly hailing from Egypt, Syria, Palestine, and Yemen.

The district is centered on Brookhurst Street in Anaheim, near the Santa Ana Freeway (I-5) between La Palma Avenue and Katella Avenue. Businesses include halal butcher shops, beauty salons, jewelry stores, Arabic and Islamic clothing, travel agencies, bakeries, Arab restaurants, and hookah cafes. There are also numerous mosques in the enclave.

== History ==
Along with most of Anaheim, the area in which Little Arabia falls was mostly developed in the 1950s due to its proximity to Disneyland and the economic outgrowth it brought to the region that had long been used for orange groves. The neighborhood lost residents over time and fell into disrepair until the 1980s when the area was revived by the emigration and immigration of Arabs that make up much of the population today.

=== Reaction to the "Arab Spring" ===
In 2011, Little Arabia became the center of Arab American activities supporting the wave of Arab revolutions known as the "Arab Spring". On February 4 a demonstration in support of the Egyptian revolution took place on Brookhurst Street followed by a celebration on February 11 after Egyptian president Hosni Mubarak was ousted and another one on February 12. A series of pro democracy protests in support of the Syrian revolution were also held. On October 20, local Libyan-Americans greeted the death of Moammar Gaddafi with joy.

During the Hosni Mubarak trial, local restaurants were packed with people glued to TV screens watching live coverage of the trial until 5 am. A restaurant also hosted an event for the Syrian American Council, an organization opposed to Bashar al-Assad's rule, on August 13. The event featured a representative of the Syrian Local Coordinating Committee addressing the attendees via Skype, as well as Ausama Monajed, editor of the "Syrian Revolution News Round-up."

=== Efforts for district status ===
Arab American business owners and activists pushed for the area to be recognized as an official district of the city of Anaheim for decades. In 2021, a majority of registered voters in the neighborhood favored the notion of receiving official recognition by the city as well as official signage noting the ethnic enclave. In 2022, the city officially recognized a mile-long stretch of Brookhurst Street.

== Economy ==
Little Arabia is known for its popular hookah lounges. More than a dozen businesses that serve hookah and/or sells hookah supplies exist in the district.

Anaheim made national news in 2005 when the city banned belly dancing in Little Arabia's hookah bars.
