= Pico Boulevard =

Major Los Angeles street

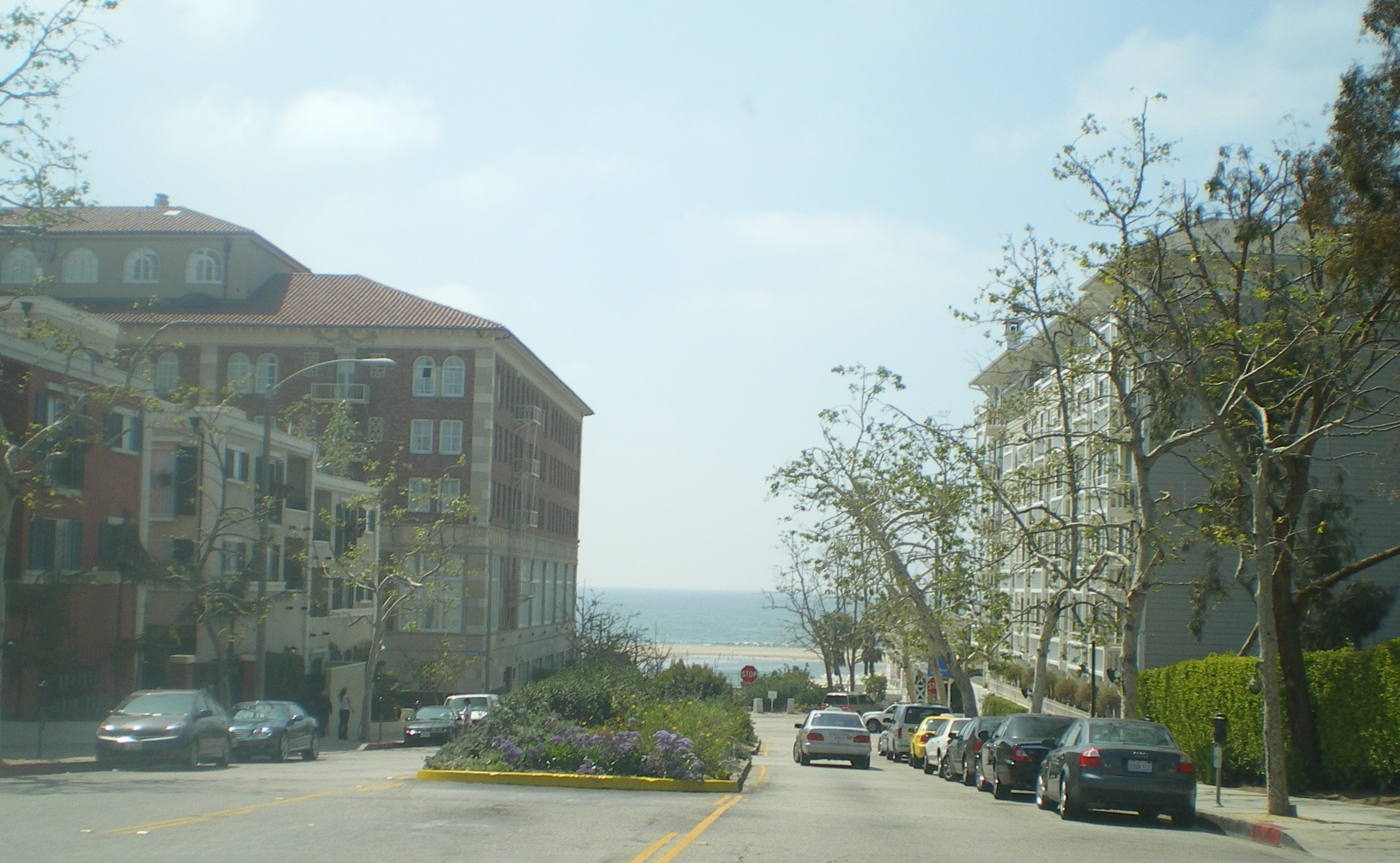
- Pico Blvd. at Pacific Ocean
- Interactive map of Pico Boulevard
- Namesake: Pío Pico
- Maintained by: Bureau of Street Services, City of L.A. DPW
- Location: Los Angeles County, California, United States
- Nearest metro station: Pico
- West end: Pacific Ocean in Santa Monica
- Major junctions: SR 1 in Santa Monica; I-10 in West Los Angeles; I-405 in West Los Angeles; I-110 in Downtown
- East end: Central Avenue in Downtown Los Angeles

Pico Boulevard is a major Los Angeles street that runs from the Pacific Ocean at Appian Way in Santa Monica to Central Avenue in downtown Los Angeles, California, United States. It is named after Pío Pico, the last Mexican governor of Alta California.

== Description ==
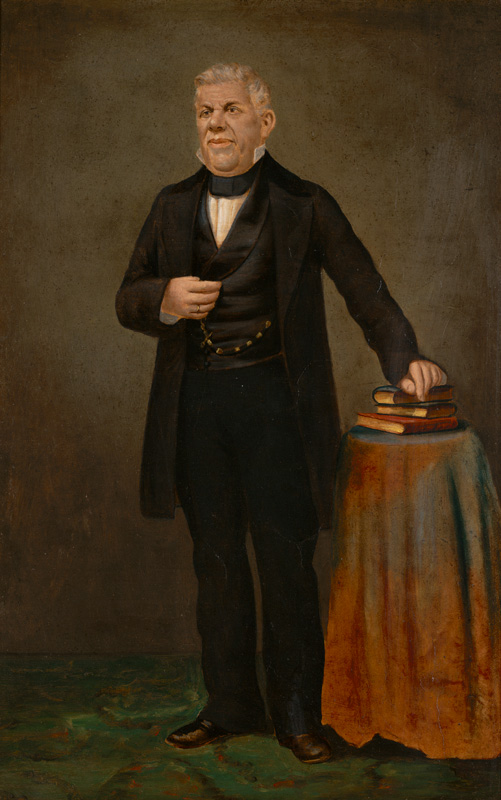
Pico Blvd. is named after Californio statesman Pío Pico, who served as the last Governor of Alta California.

Pico runs parallel south of Olympic Boulevard and is one of the southernmost major streets leading into Downtown Los Angeles, running north of Venice Boulevard and south of Olympic Boulevard. Numerically, it takes the place of 13th Street (many cities with numbered streets use a named street in place of thirteen).

Major landmarks include Santa Monica College, Santa Monica High School, the Westside Pavilion mall, Fox Studios, the Hillcrest Country Club, the Crypto.com Arena, and the Los Angeles Convention Center.

Pico Boulevard starts in the city of Santa Monica and enters the city of Los Angeles near the intersection with Centinela Avenue. The neighborhoods of Los Angeles through which Pico Boulevard travels are among the most culturally diverse in the city. From west to east, they include the Japanese and Persian neighborhoods of Sawtelle, the 11 neighborhoods in the West Los Angeles region which are the predominantly Anglo neighborhoods of Cheviot Hills and Rancho Park, the business and entertainment center of Century City, and the primarily and largely Jewish, African American and Latino neighborhoods of South Robertson, Crestview, South Carthay, Carthay Square, Little Ethiopia, Wilshire Vista and Picfair Village, the Latino Mid-Wilshire subregion, the heavily Korean neighborhoods of Country Club Park and Koreatown, the predominantly Central American neighborhoods of the Byzantine-Latino Quarter and Pico Union, the redeveloping South Park, the Garment District of Downtown Los Angeles and the Mexican-American neighborhood of Boyle Heights.

== Notable landmarks ==
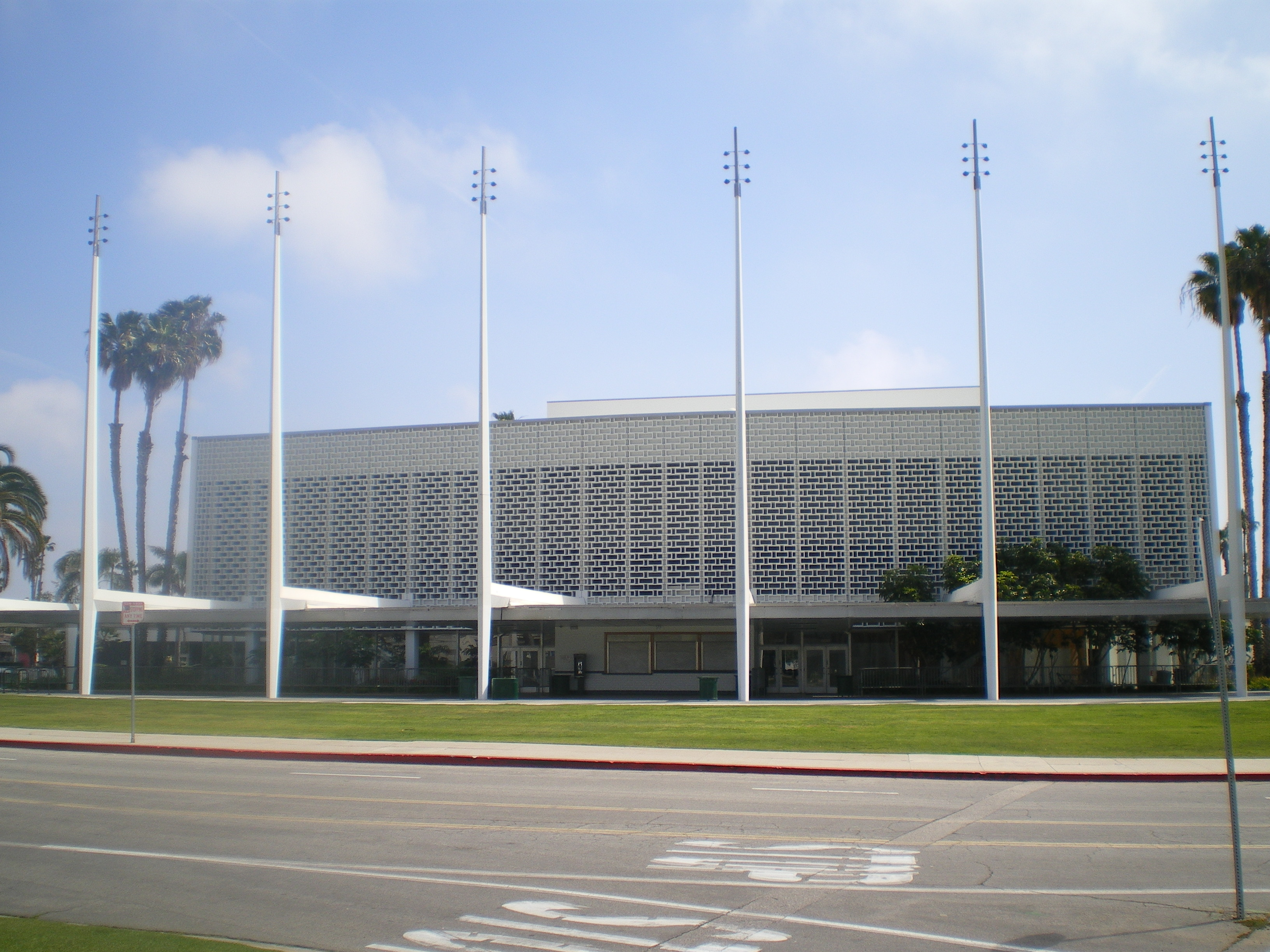
Santa Monica Civic Auditorium

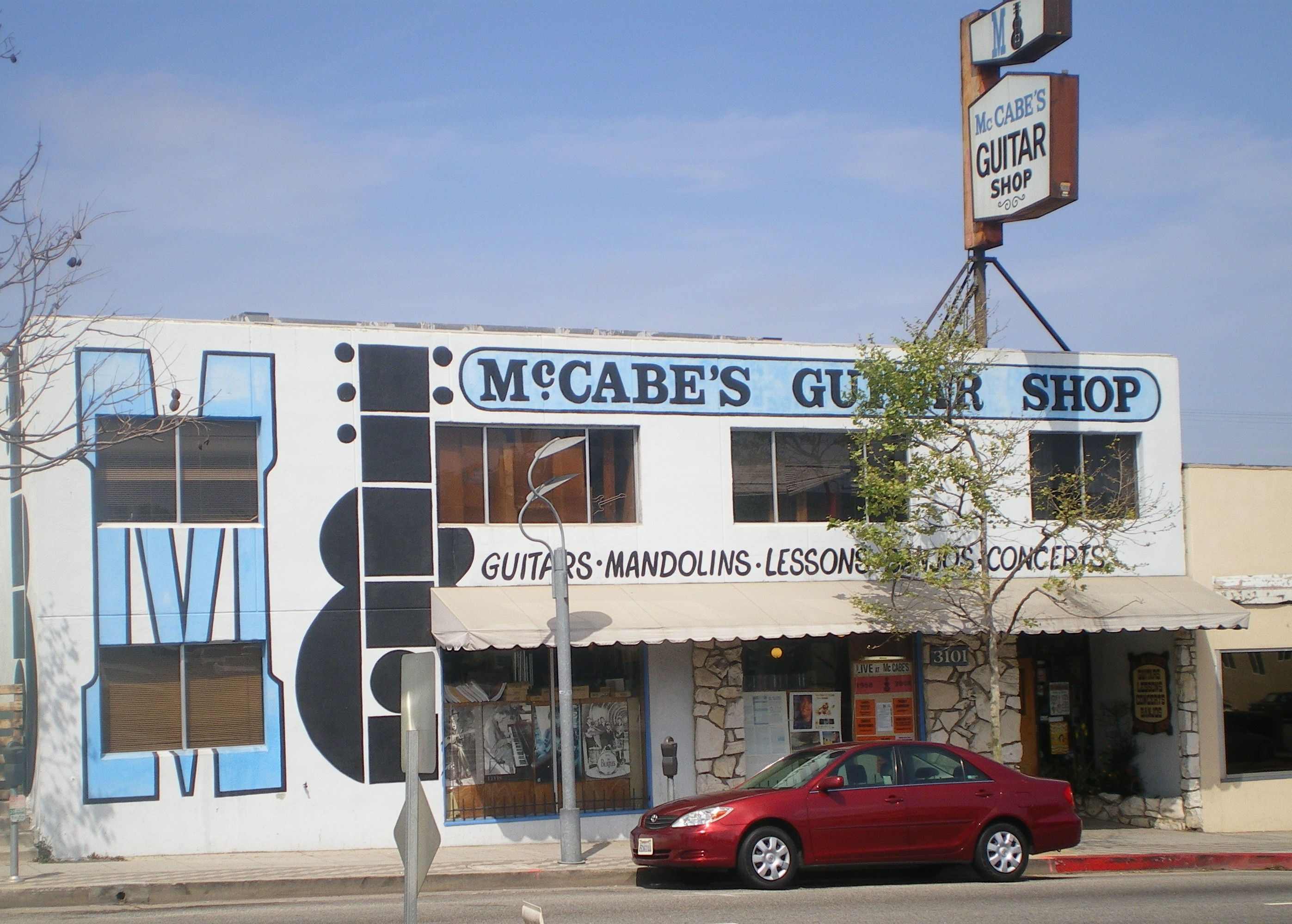
McCabe's Guitar Shop

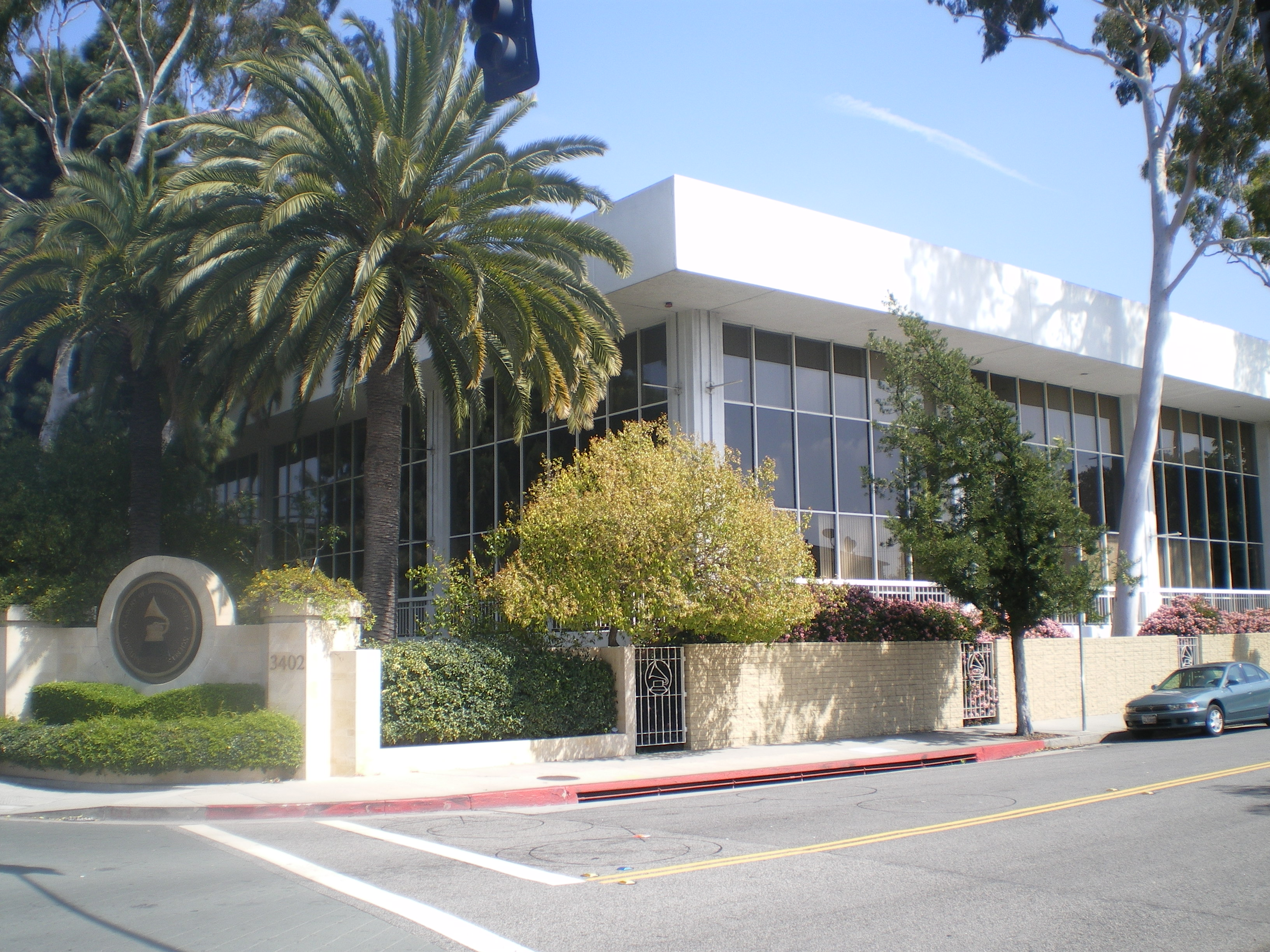
Former National Academy of Recording Arts and Sciences headquarters

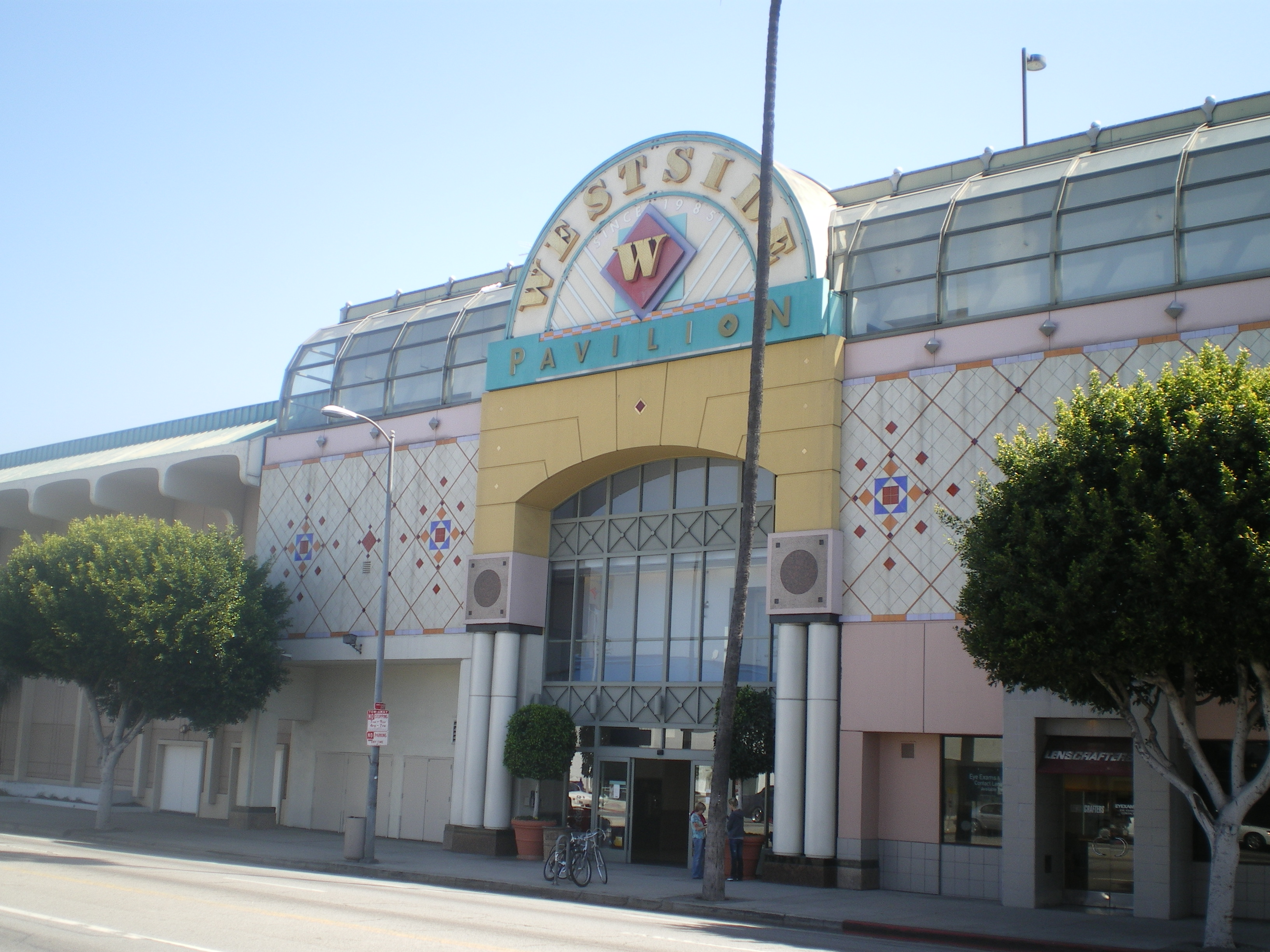
Westside Pavilion

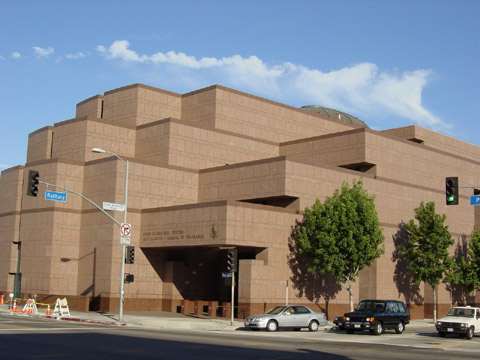
Museum of Tolerance.

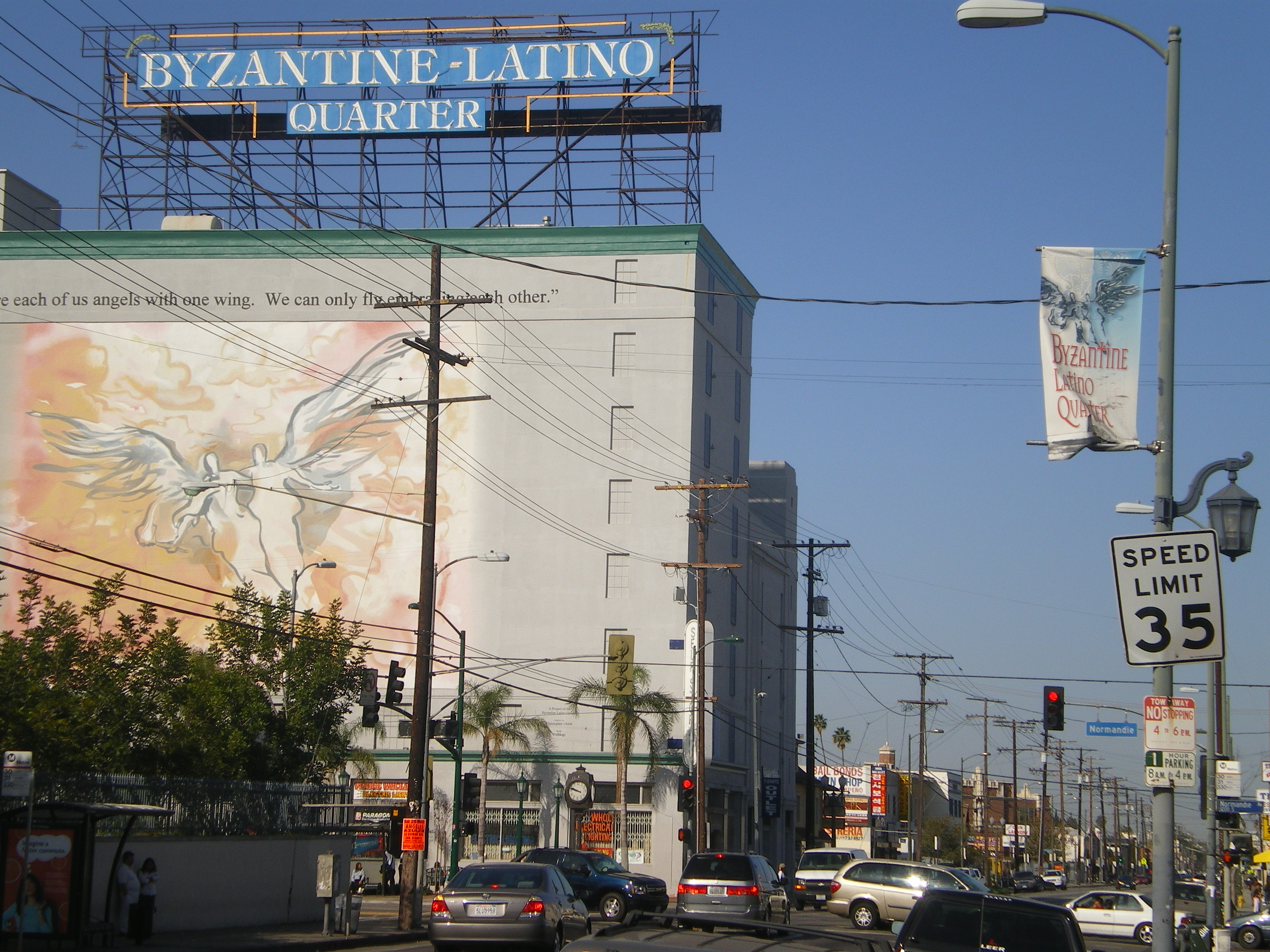
Byzantine-Latino Quarter

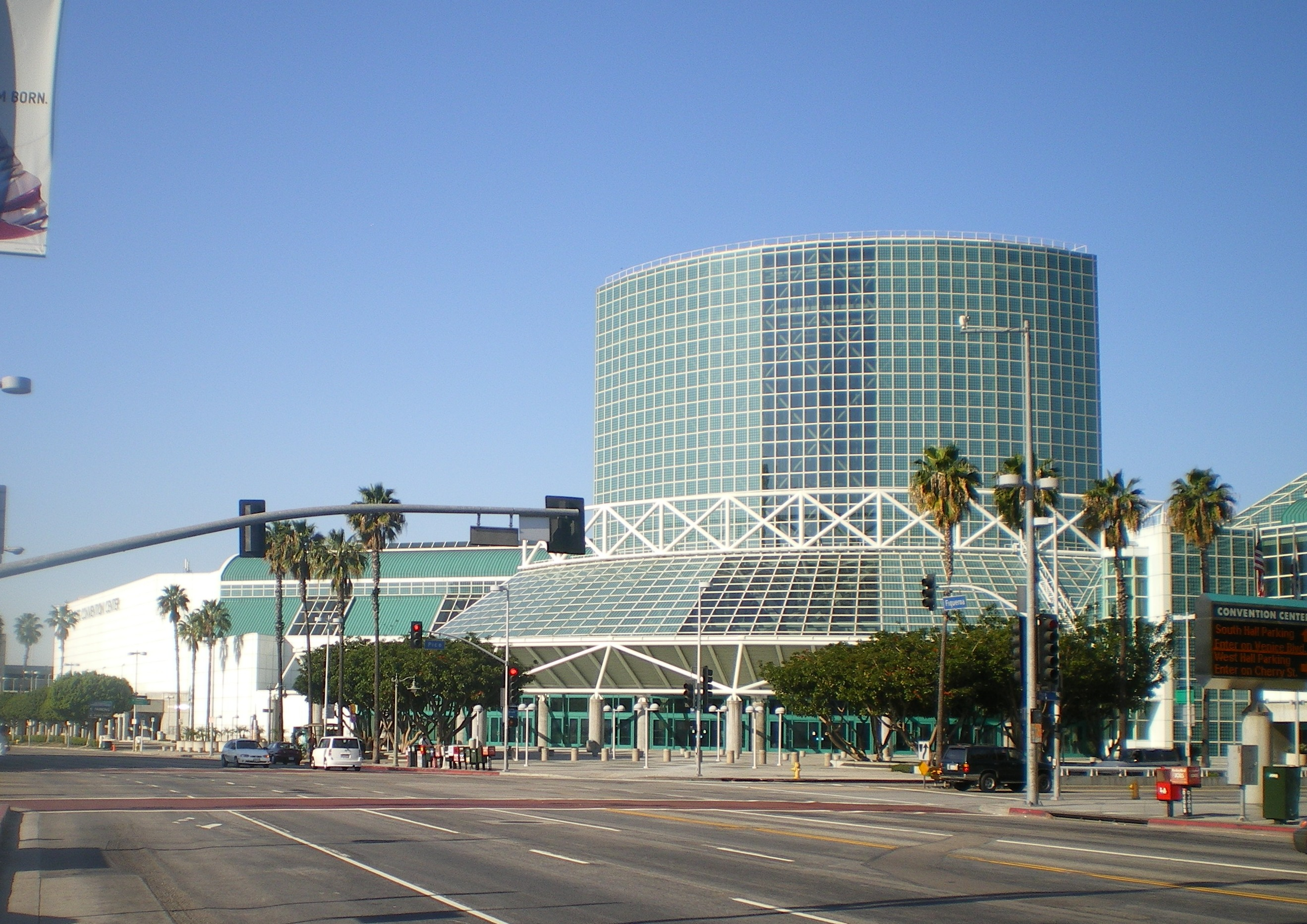
Los Angeles Convention Center

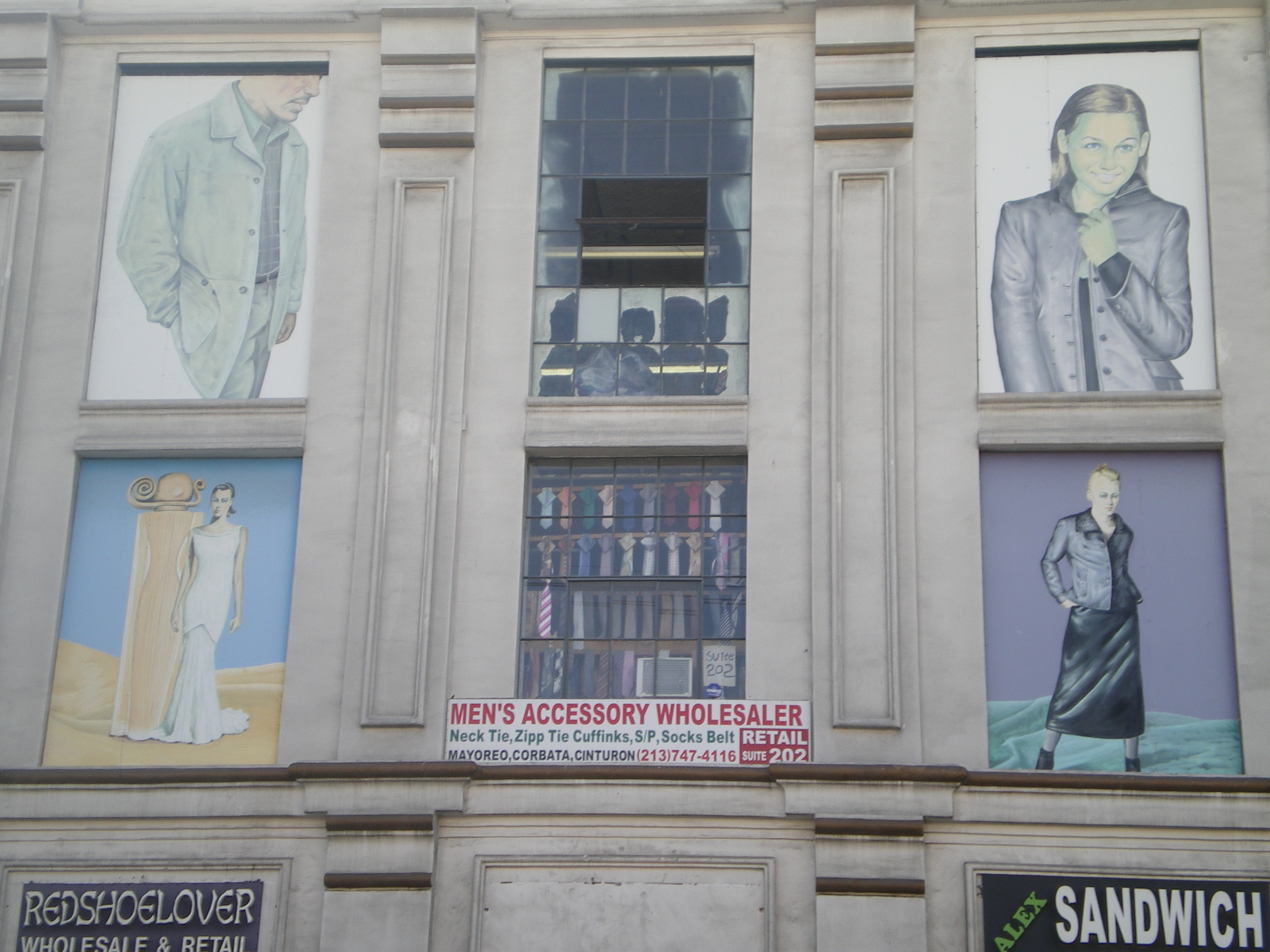
Fashion District, Pico & Santee

- Santa Monica State Beach: California State Park operated by the City of Santa Monica. It is two miles (3 km) long, has a picnic area, shops and pier. Visitor activities include volleyball, basketball and a bicycling and running path along the beach.
- Casa del Mar hotel: luxury hotel at base of Pico Boulevard, Club Casa del Mar originally opened in 1926 as a beach club. The building, built in a Renaissance Revival architectural style, became a hotel and recreation center for U.S. service personnel during World War II. After the war, the building underwent different incarnations, becoming, among other things, a drug rehabilitation center and a Pritikin Longevity Center. In 1998, The Edward Thomas Hospitality Corporation acquired the building and converted it into a luxury hotel.
- RAND Corporation Headquarters: opened in November 2004, the RAND Corporation new headquarters facility was awarded the U.S. Green Building Council's Gold Leadership in Energy and Environmental Design (LEED) certification for the environmentally responsible design of the headquarters campus, along with the Los Angeles Architectural Award for corporate headquarters design.
- Santa Monica Civic Auditorium: 1855 Main Street (at Pico); 3,000-seat auditorium opened in 1958 and designed in the international style by Welton Becket; home of the Academy Awards ceremony 1961–1968.
- Santa Monica High School: 601 Pico Blvd.; public high school opened at same location since 1906; alumni include Dean Cain, Ry Cooder, Carson Daly, Robert Downey, Jr., Daryl Dragon (Captain & Tennille), John Ehrlichman, Emilio Estevez, Glenn Ford, Rob Lowe, Sean Penn, Charlie Sheen, and Heather Thomas.
- Woodlawn Memorial Cemetery, Santa Monica: 1847 14th Street (at Pico); celebrities buried at Woodlawn include Glenn Ford, Paul Henreid (Victor Laszlo in Casablanca, Charles Bickford (three-time Oscar nominee), Irene Ryan (Granny on The Beverly Hillbillies), Ted Bessell (boyfriend Donald on That Girl)
- Santa Monica College: first opened in 1929 as Santa Monica Junior College, current enrollment is 32,000 students; the college also has one of the largest international student populations of any community college in the US, with approximately 3,000 from more than 100 countries.
- McCabe's Guitar Shop: Located at 3101 Pico Blvd., Santa Monica, McCabe's is a musical instrument store, established by Gerald McCabe in 1958, specializing in acoustic and folk instruments: guitars, banjos, mandolins, dulcimers, fiddles, psaltries, bouzoukis, sitars, ouds, ethnic percussion. Since 1969, McCabe's has also been one of the most noted forums for folk concerts.
- National Academy of Recording Arts and Sciences: Formerly headquartered at 3402 Pico Blvd., Santa Monica, the Recording Academy is a U.S. organization of musicians, producers, recording engineers and other recording professionals dedicated to improving the quality of life and cultural condition for music and its makers. The academy is famous internationally for the Grammy Awards. (NARAS moved to a new location in 2009, although the Pico Boulevard building still stands.)
- Pico and Sepulveda: a song by Felix Figueroa & His Orchestra (stage name for Freddy Martin's band). The 1947 song was frequently featured on Dr. Demento's radio show. It is about streets in Los Angeles and was composed by Eddie Maxwell and Jule Styne.
- The Apple Pan: Located at 10801 W. Pico Blvd., Los Angeles, The Apple Pan restaurant opened in 1947 and is locally famous for its hickory hamburgers and apple pies served with vanilla ice cream. In the first season of Six Feet Under, Nate Fisher (Peter Krause) asks his sister Claire (Lauren Ambrose) if she wants to go to the Apple Pan to eat together.
- Rancho Park Golf Course: Located along Pico Boulevard in West Los Angeles, Rancho Park Golf Course was the busiest golf course in the United States with more than 125,000 rounds played. In 2000 Rancho was the only golf course in the United States to have hosted the PGA, LPGA and the Senior PGA. The golf course first opened in 1921 and was built on land that was part of Rancho Rincon de los Bueyes in what was in 1921 the town of Sawtelle, 12 miles (19 km) west of Los Angeles.
- Cheviot Hills Park and Recreation Center: Located at the corner of Motor Avenue and Pico, the Cheviot Hills Park and Recreation Center includes 14 tennis courts, basketball courts, gym, picnic areas, volleyball courts, archery range, auditorium with stage, amphitheater, and sports fields.
- Fox Studio Lot: 20th Century Studios, 20th Century, or simply 20th, is a subsidiary of Walt Disney Studios. In 1926 Fox acquired 300 acres (1.2 km^{2}) in the open country west of Beverly Hills and built "Movietone City", the best-equipped studio of its time. In 1957, Fox announced plans to develop a portion of its backlot into a new city center. In 1963 the first building, Century City Gateway West, was complete, followed the next year by Minoru Yamasaki's Century Plaza Hotel. The Fox Studio Lot continues as an active film and television studio on the southwest portion of the property, along Pico Boulevard.
- Hillcrest Country Club: Located at 10000 West Pico Blvd., is a country club and golf course located across the street from Fox Studios. Hillcrest was the first Los Angeles country club for the city's Jewish community. In old Hollywood, when Jews were not permitted to join non-Jewish country clubs, they instead joined Hillcrest, all of whose members were Jewish. Hillcrest's members have long included many of Hollywood's biggest stars, including Milton Berle, Jack Benny, and George Burns. Even Groucho Marx, who famously proclaimed that he would not want to be a member of any club willing to have him as a member, was a member. Producer Louis B. Mayer reportedly punched producer Sam Goldwyn in the showers at Hillcrest. The 18-hole "Hillcrest" golf course was designed by Willie Watson and opened in 1920.
- Simon Wiesenthal Center: With headquarters at 1399 South Roxbury Drive (at Pico), Los Angeles, the Wiesenthal Center was established in 1977 as "an international Jewish human rights organization" dedicated to confronting antisemitism, hate and terrorism, promoting human rights and dignity, standing with Israel, defending the safety of Jews worldwide, and teaching the lessons of the Holocaust for future generations.
- Museum of Tolerance: Located at 9786 West Pico Blvd., Los Angeles, the Museum of Tolerance is a multi-media museum opened in 1993. It receives 350,000 visitors annually. In "The Holocaust Section," visitors are divided into groups to take their own place in some of the events of World War II. The museum also features the testimonies of Holocaust survivors. A classroom visit to the museum was featured in the 2007 movie, Freedom Writers. The museum was parodied in an episode of South Park called "The Death Camp of Tolerance".
- Byzantine-Latino Quarter A neighborhood known for its historically Greek American population (Saint Sophia Greek Orthodox Cathedral is just south of Pico), now primarily Latino in population.
- St. Thomas the Apostle Church: founded in 1903, St. Thomas the Apostle is one of the oldest parishes in Los Angeles, located at the corner of West Pico Boulevard and Mariposa Avenue. The architecture of the church is from the Spanish renaissance period used in many of the old mission churches.
- Los Angeles Convention Center: 720,000 sq ft (67,000 m^{2}) convention center in downtown Los Angeles. The LACC hosts annual events such as the Greater Los Angeles Auto Show, Anime Expo, and the Electronic Entertainment Expo. The LACC also gained notoriety for hosting Celebration IV.
- Fashion District: The Fashion District is a design, warehouse, and distribution nexus of the clothing, accessories and fabric industry in Downtown Los Angeles. The district spans 90 blocks and is the hub of the apparel industry on the West Coast of the United States. The area also features Santee Alley, a heavily populated "back alley" shopping path between Maple and Santee Streets.

== Education and transportation ==
- Pico Boulevard is served by two major bus companies: Santa Monica Transit line 7 and Metro Local line 30, which meet in Mid-City at the old Vineyard Junction at Pico and Rimpau Boulevards, a former rail stop of the Pacific Electric Red Car Lines; Santa Monica line 7 runs between Ocean Avenue and Wilshire/Western station. Metro line 30 runs between Rimpau Boulevard and Downtown LA. In Downtown Los Angeles, Pico Boulevard intersects with the Metro A Line and E Line light rail, and is served by the station of the same name, while in West Los Angeles, it is served by the E Line’s Expo/Sepulveda station slightly south of its intersection with Sepulveda Boulevard. The Metro J Line bus rapid transit line stops at Figueroa/Pico northbound, and at Flower/Pico southbound. The train station and the J Line stop are directly adjacent to the Staples Center, the Los Angeles Convention Center, the Nokia Theater, and several new housing and entertainment developments in the South Park district.
- Bishop Conaty-Our Lady of Loretto High School is located on Pico Boulevard.

== In popular culture ==
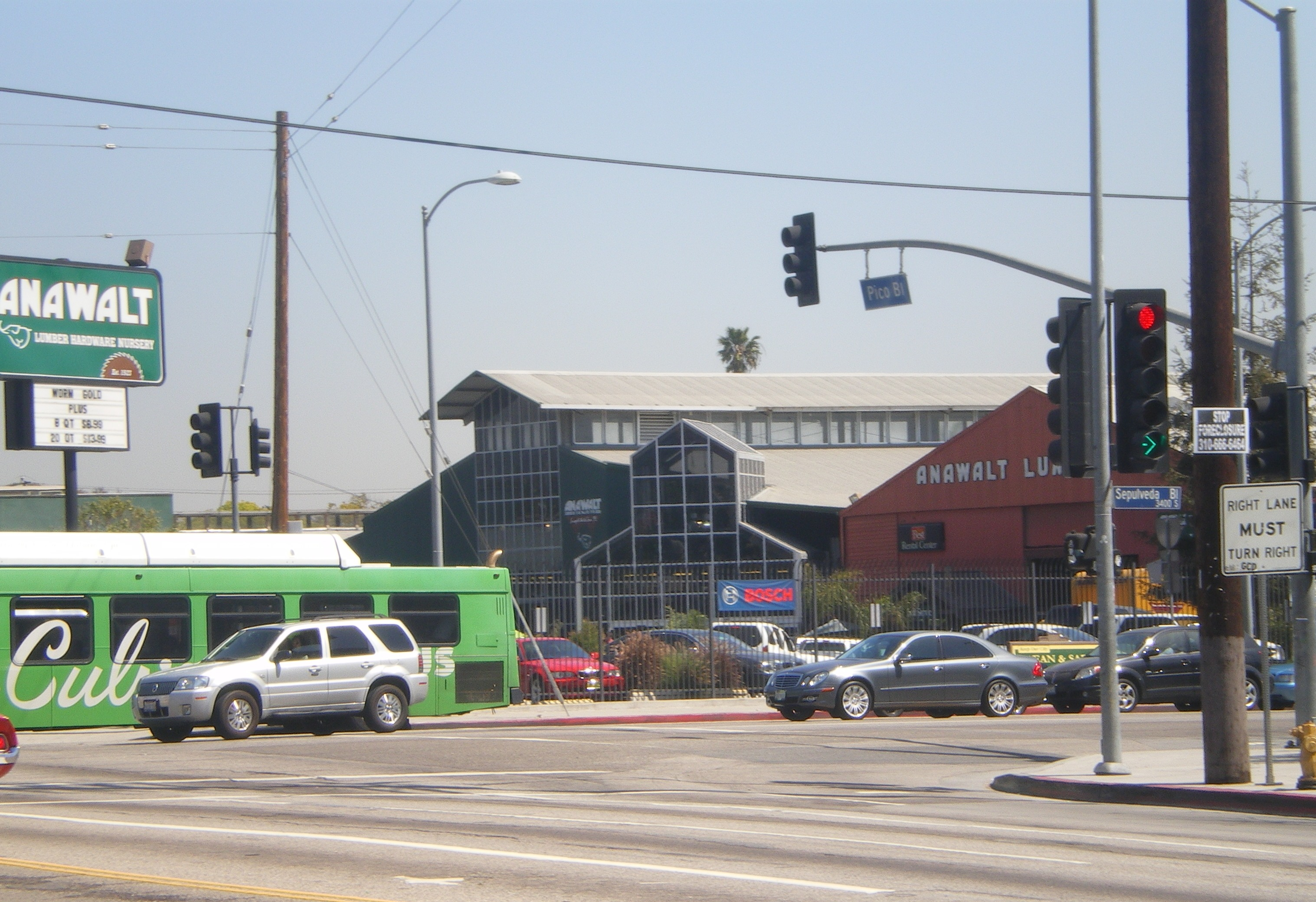
Pico and Sepulveda, 2008

- The 1947 song "Pico and Sepulveda" by Felix Figueroa & His Orchestra (actually Freddy Martin & His Orchestra) was frequently featured on Dr. Demento's syndicated radio show.
- Tech-noir, the fictional nightclub in The Terminator (1984) is located on Pico boulevard. During production, the crew had to keep out people who believed it was a real club.
- The music video for the 1991 single "Unfinished Sympathy" by band Massive Attack features singer Shara Nelson walking along West Pico Boulevard in an unbroken camera shot.
- Photographer John Humble documented the boulevard in a 2014 photo series exhibited at Craig Krull Gallery.

== Gallery of landmarks along Pico Boulevard ==
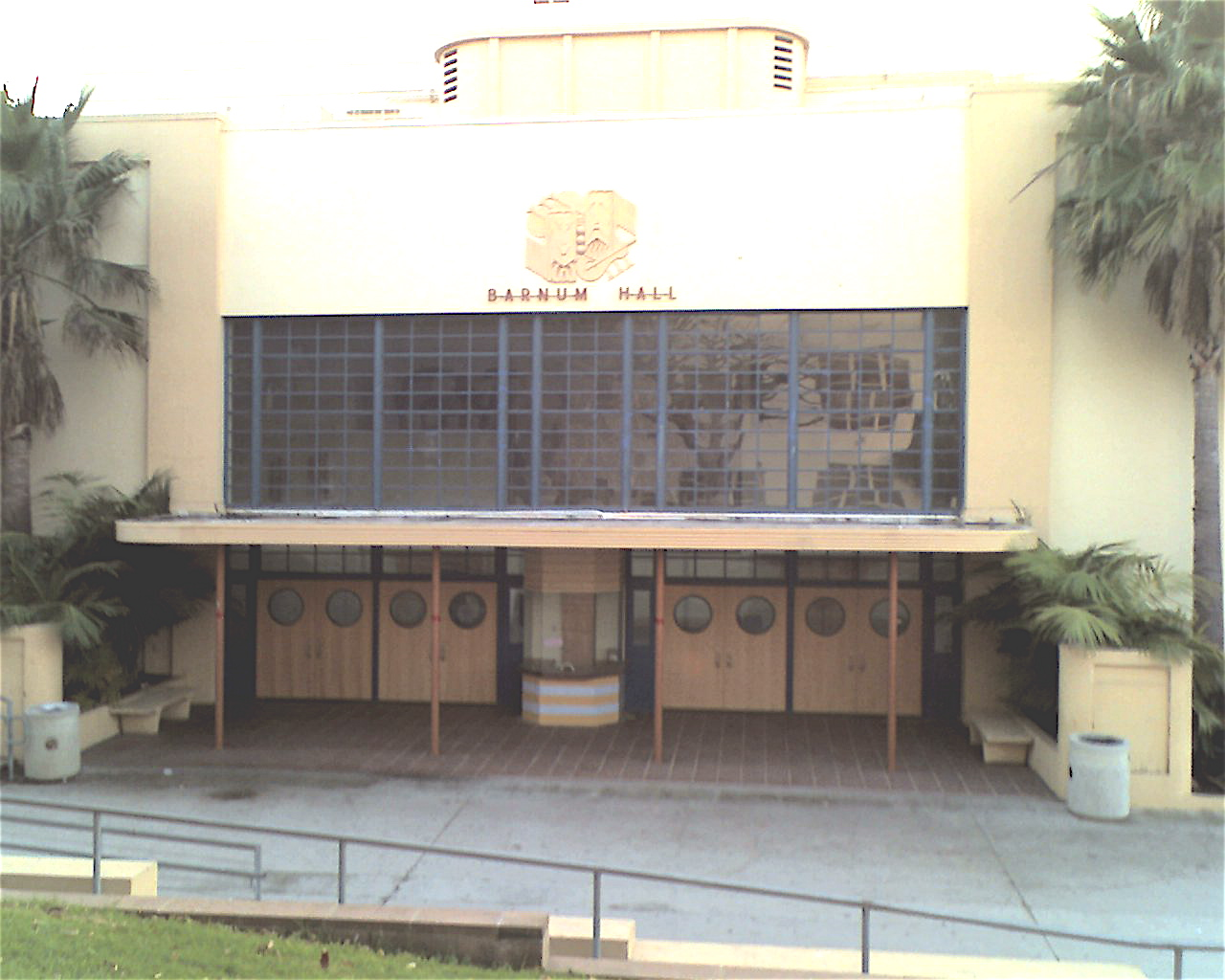
Barnum Hall, Santa Monica High School

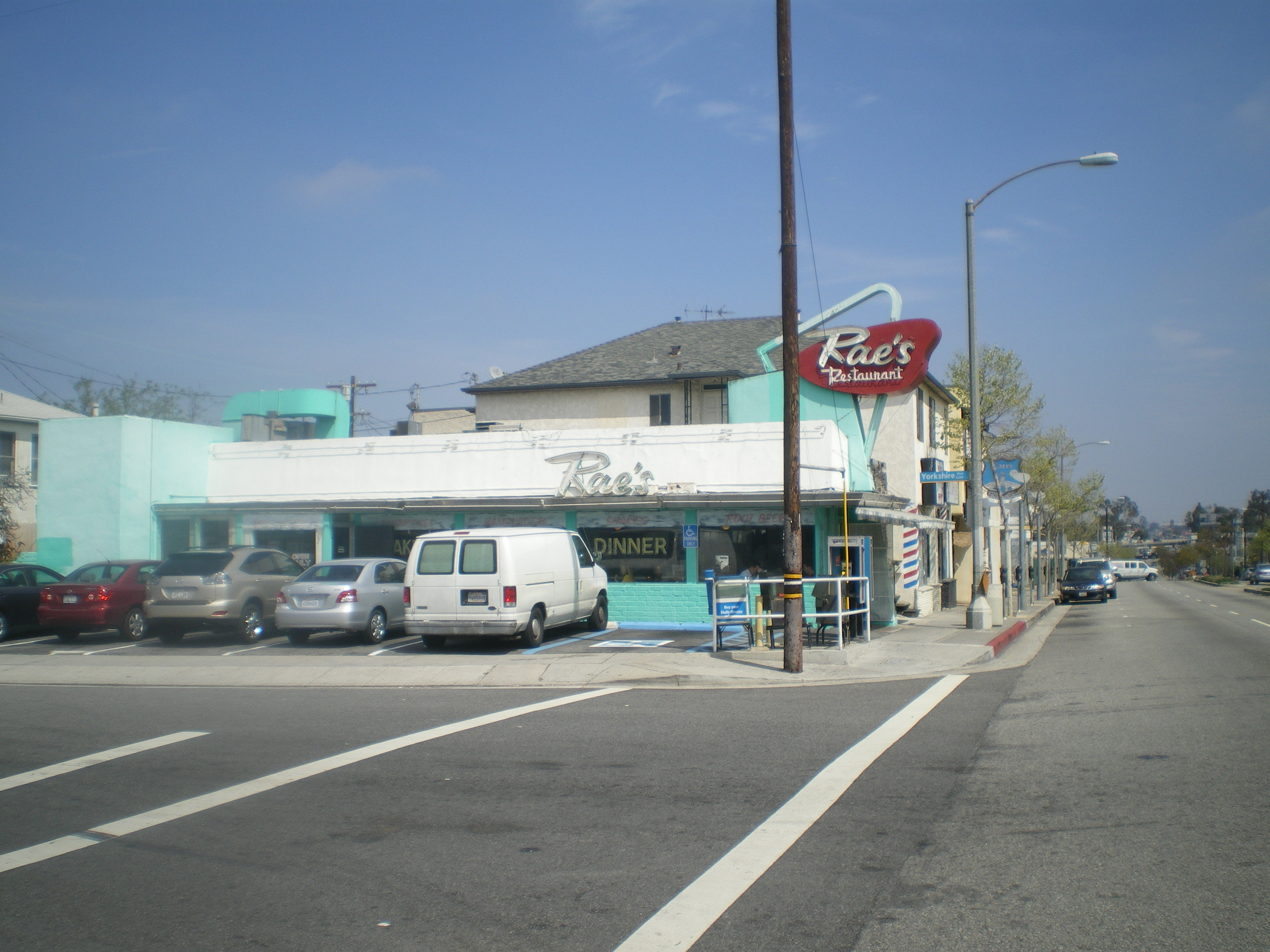
Rae's Restaurant, 2901 Pico Blvd., Santa Monica

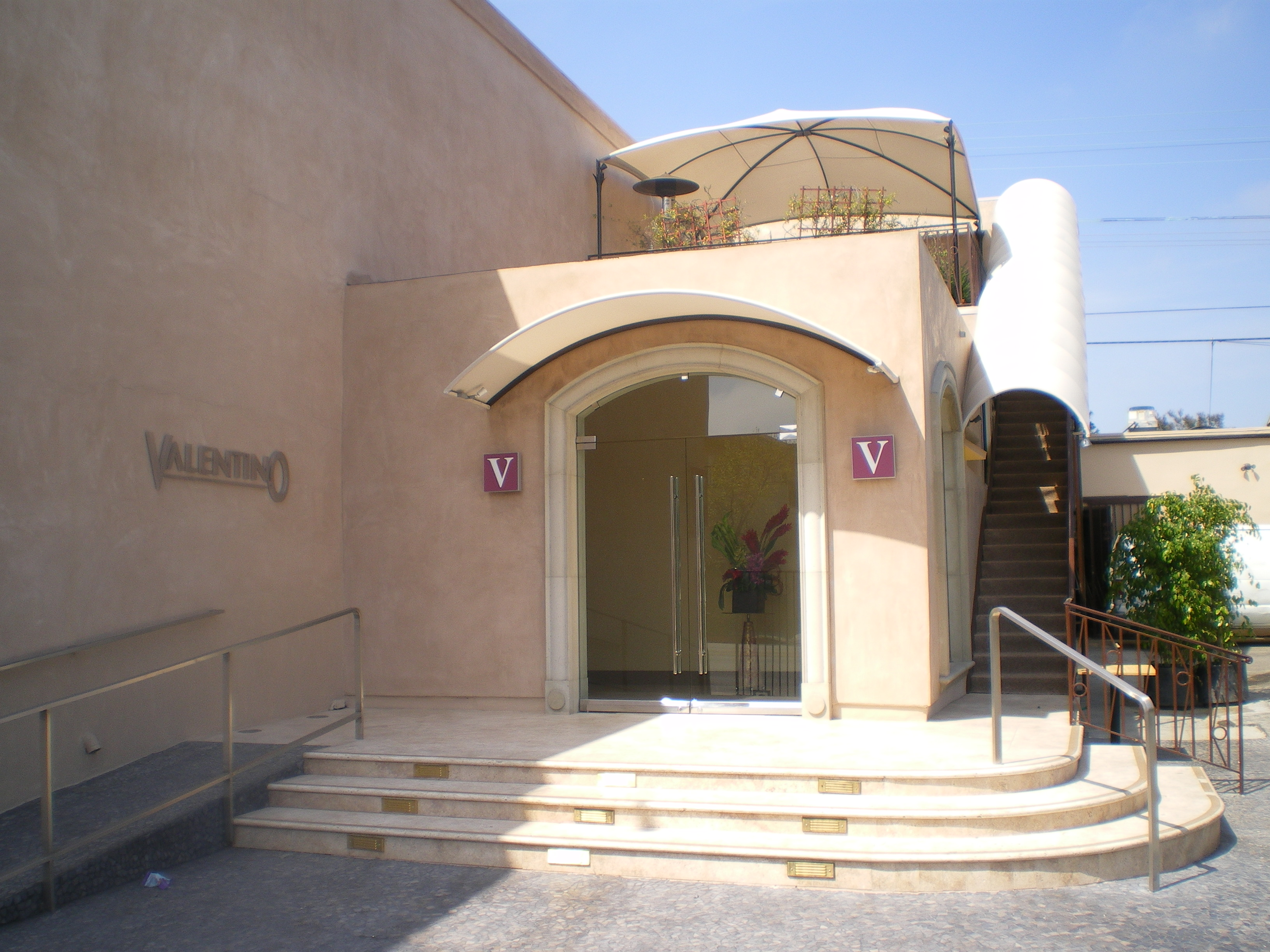
Valentino Restaurant, Santa Monica

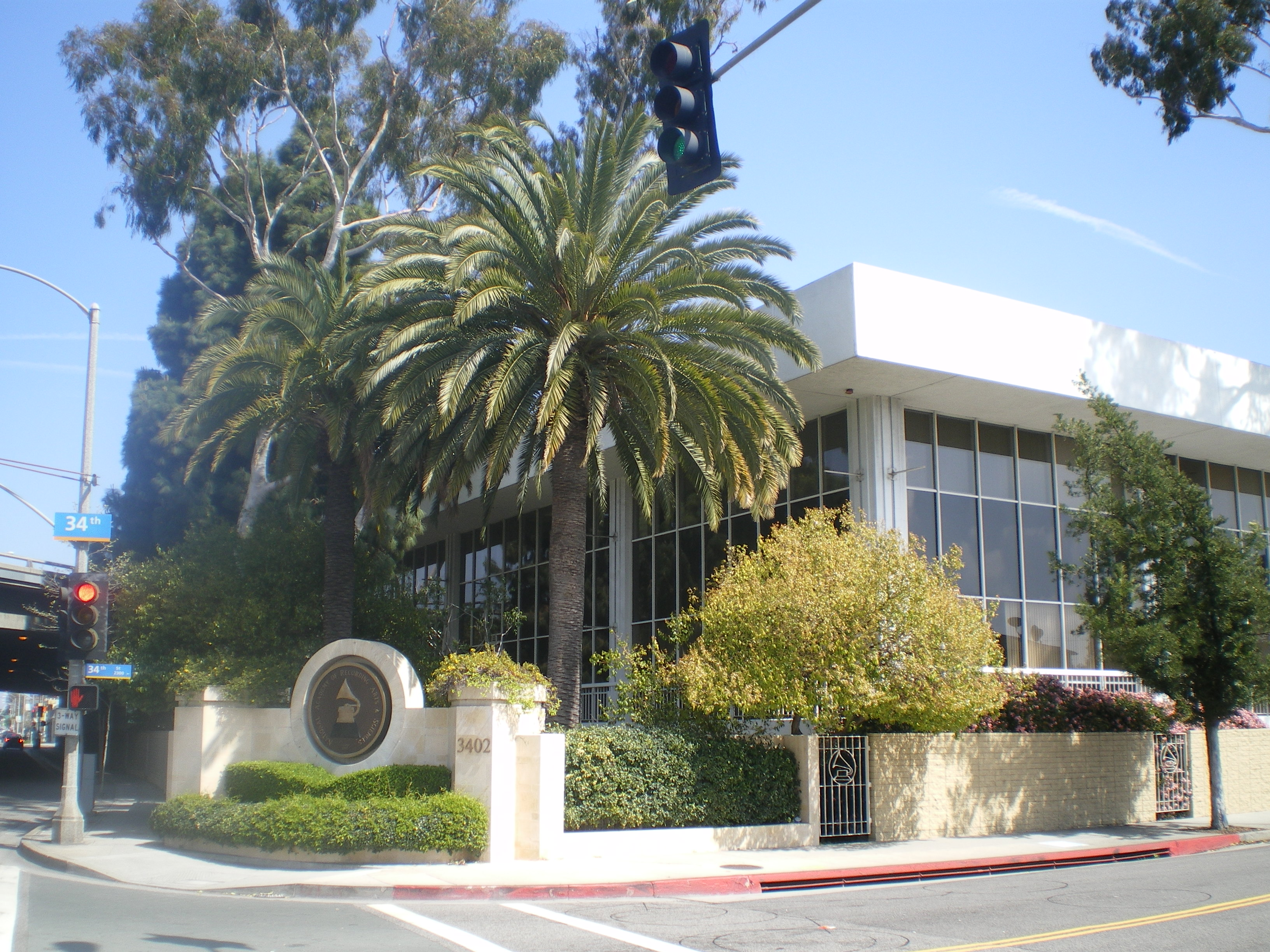
National Academy of Recording Arts and Sciences, West LA

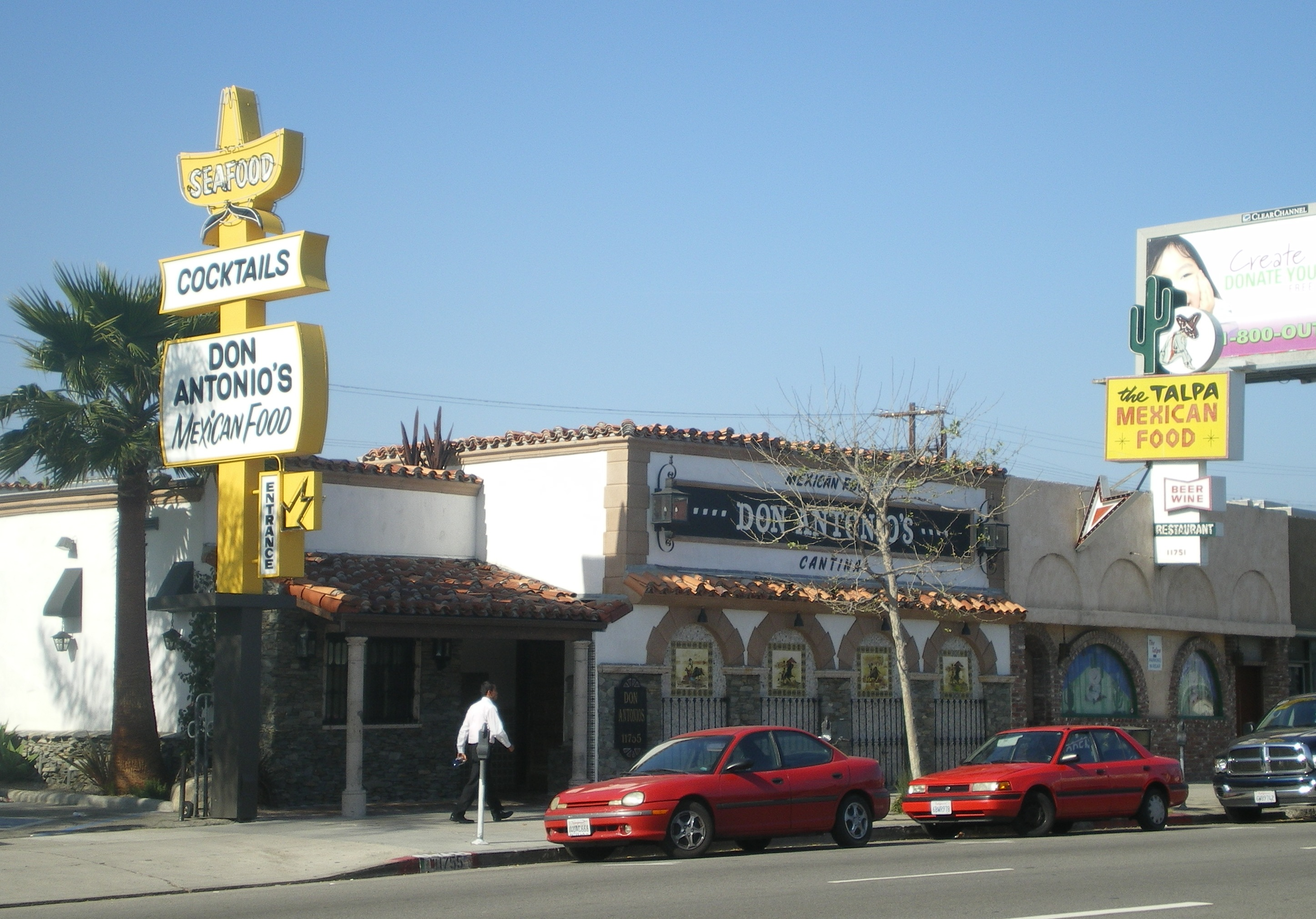
Talpa and Don Antonio's, 11751 and 11755 W Pico Blvd, West LA

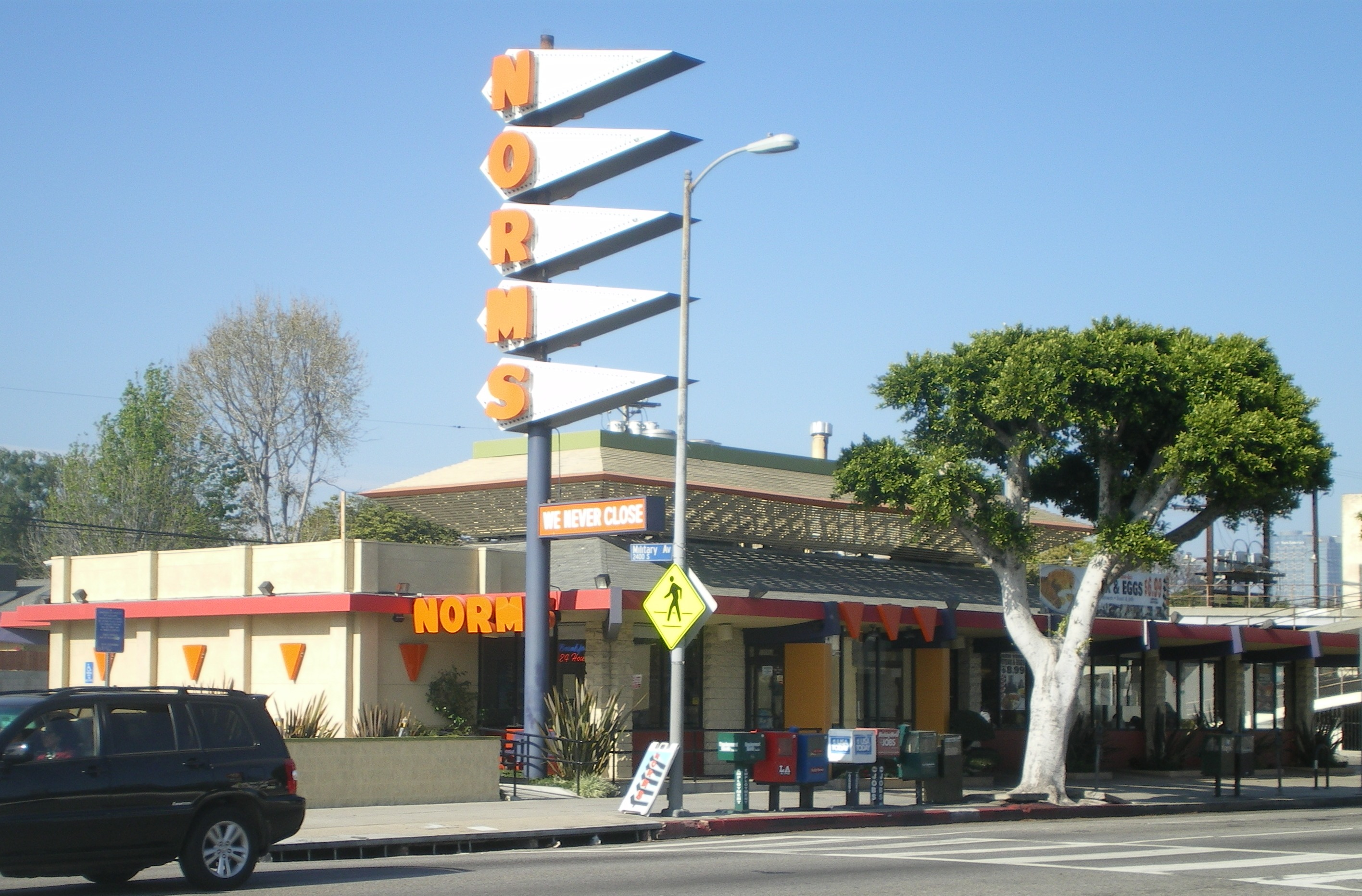
Norms Restaurant, 11001 W Pico Blvd

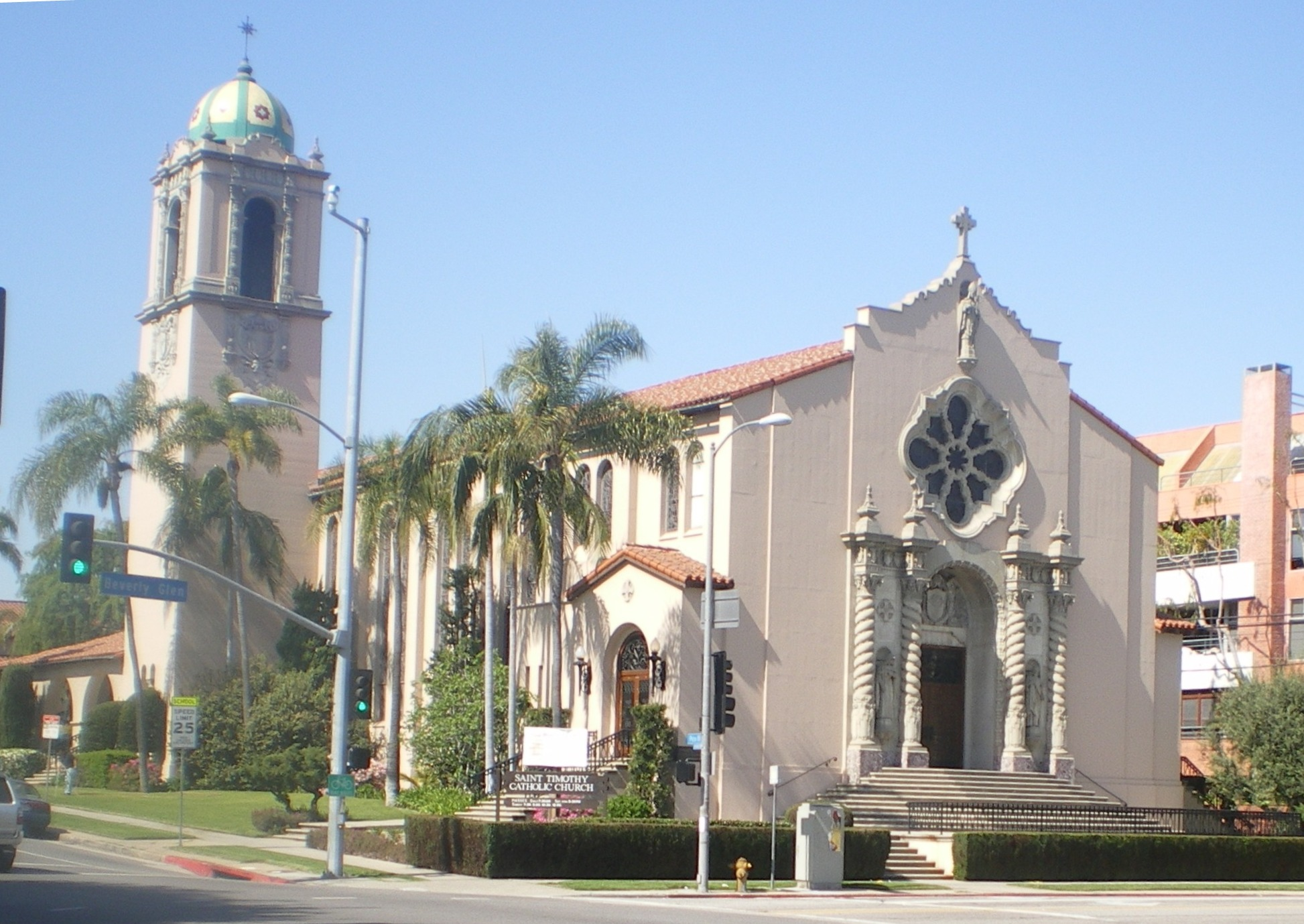
St. Timothy's Catholic Church, 10425 W. Pico Boulevard (at Beverly Glen)

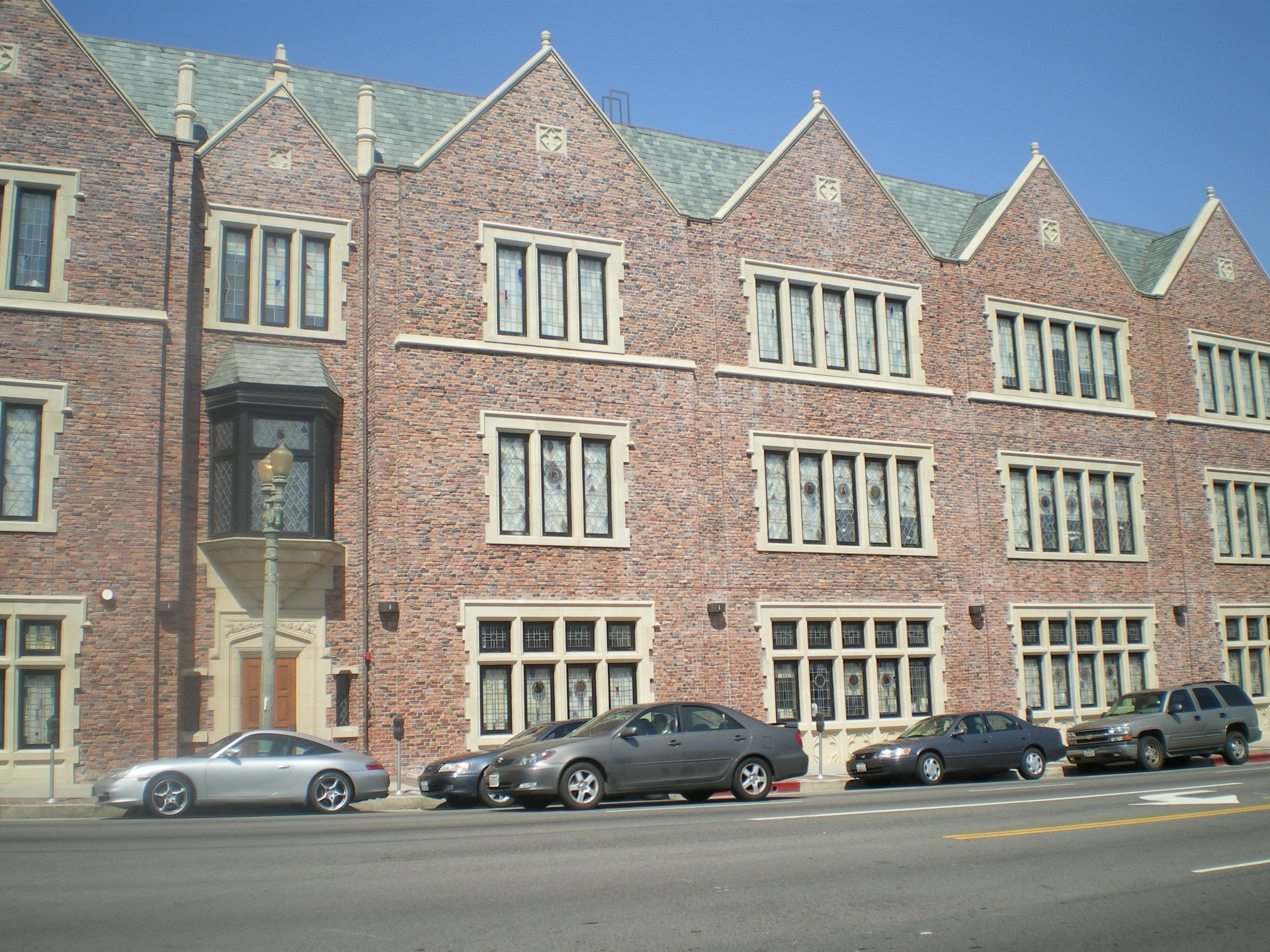
Chabad Bais Sonia Gutte Campus

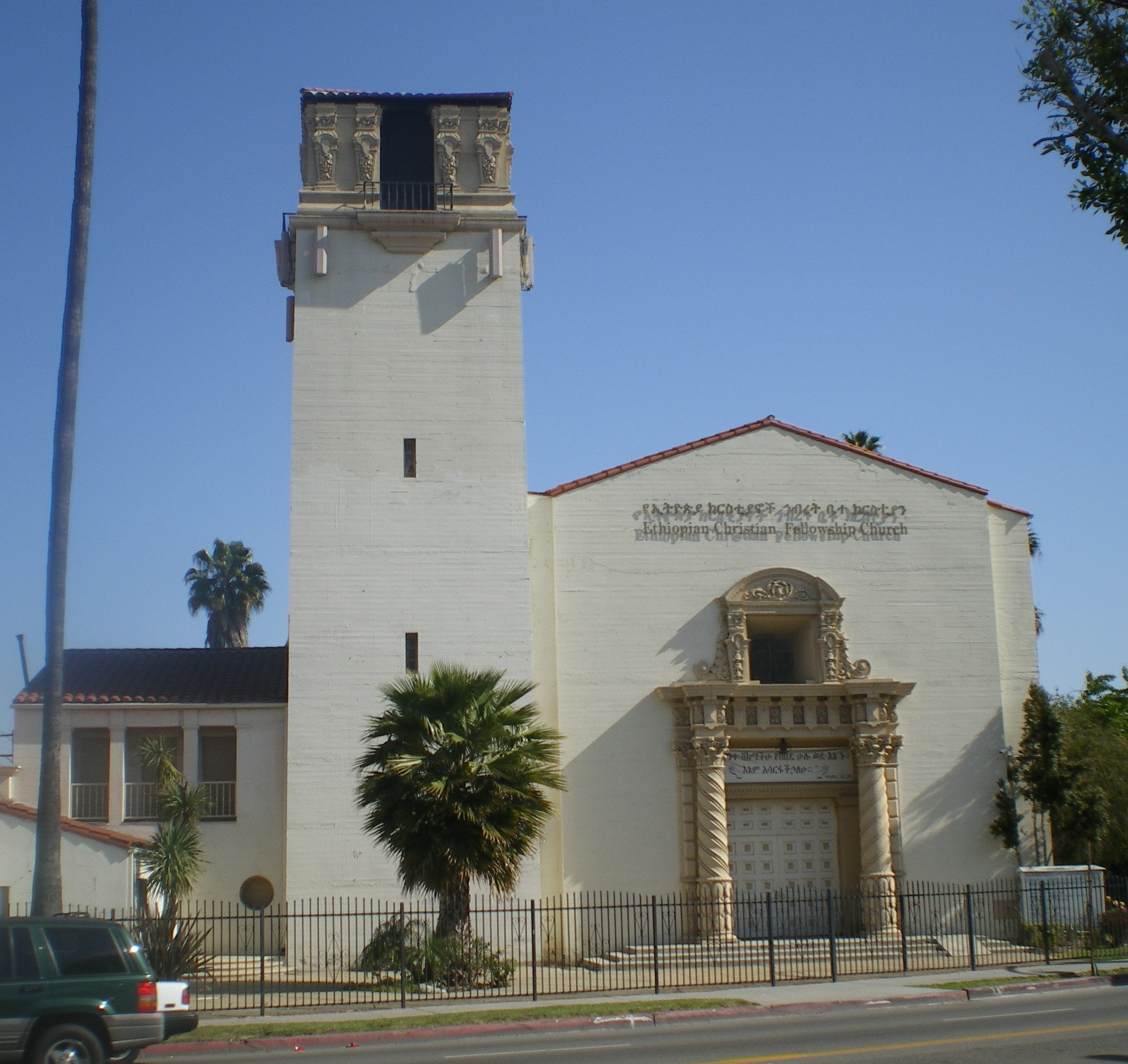
Ethiopian Christian Fellowship Church of Los Angeles, 3405 W. Pico Blvd.

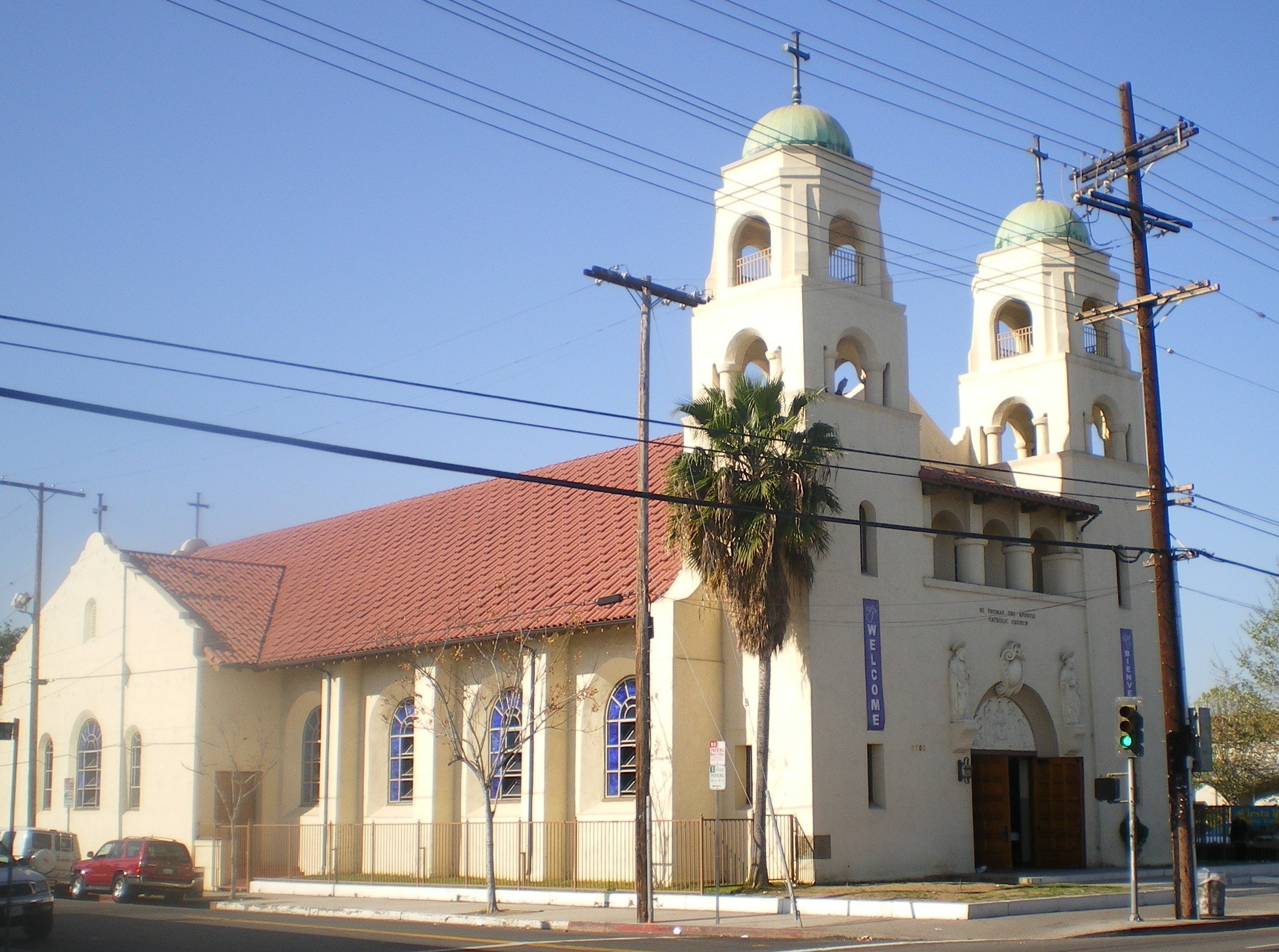
St. Thomas the Apostle Church, 2727 W. Pico Blvd.

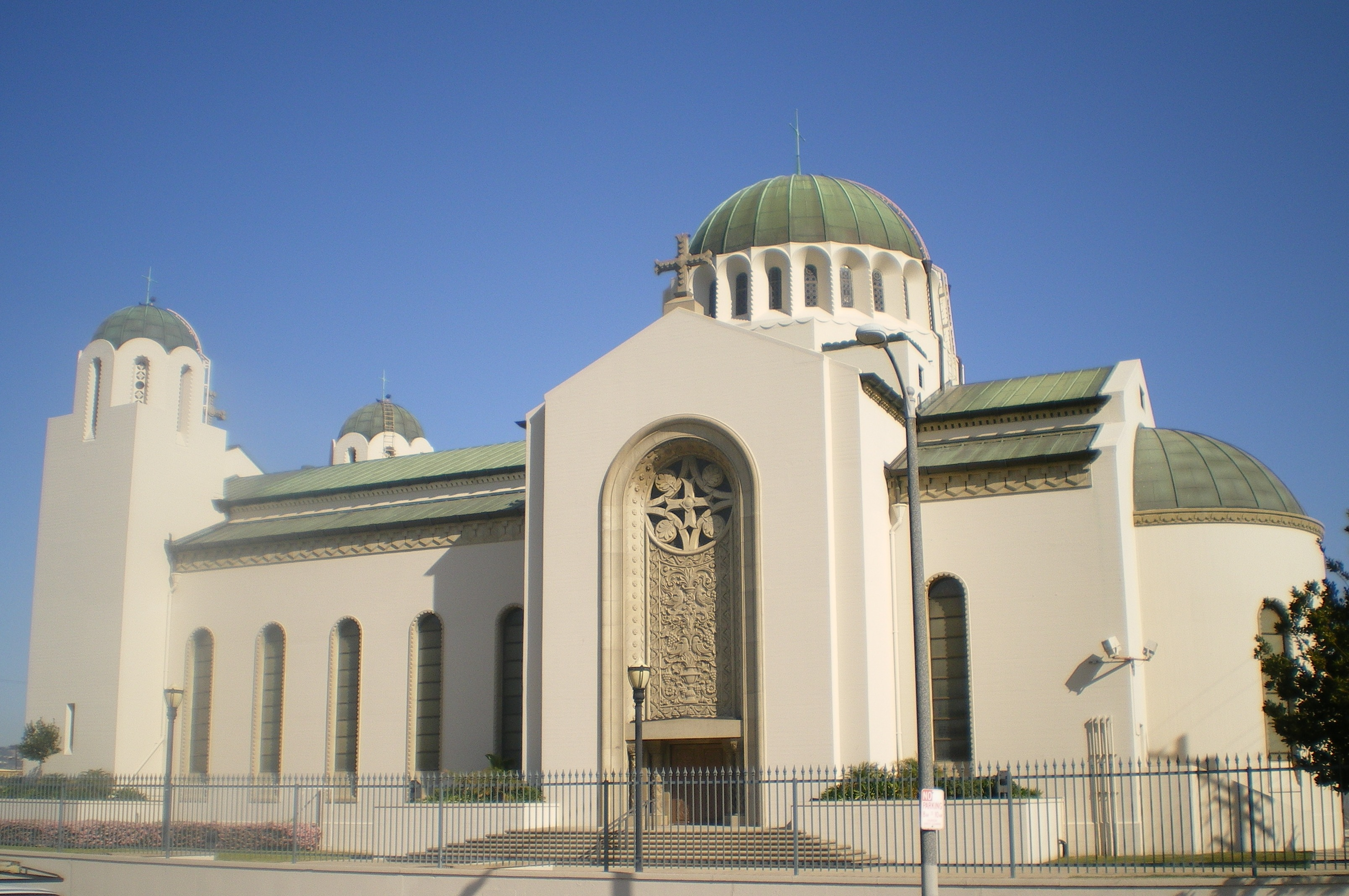
St. Sophia's Greek Orthodox Church, 1324 S. Normandie
