= Bishop Conaty-Our Lady of Loretto High School =

Catholic school in Los Angeles, California

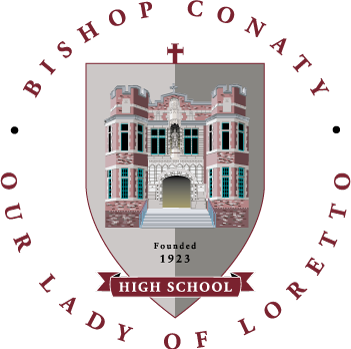

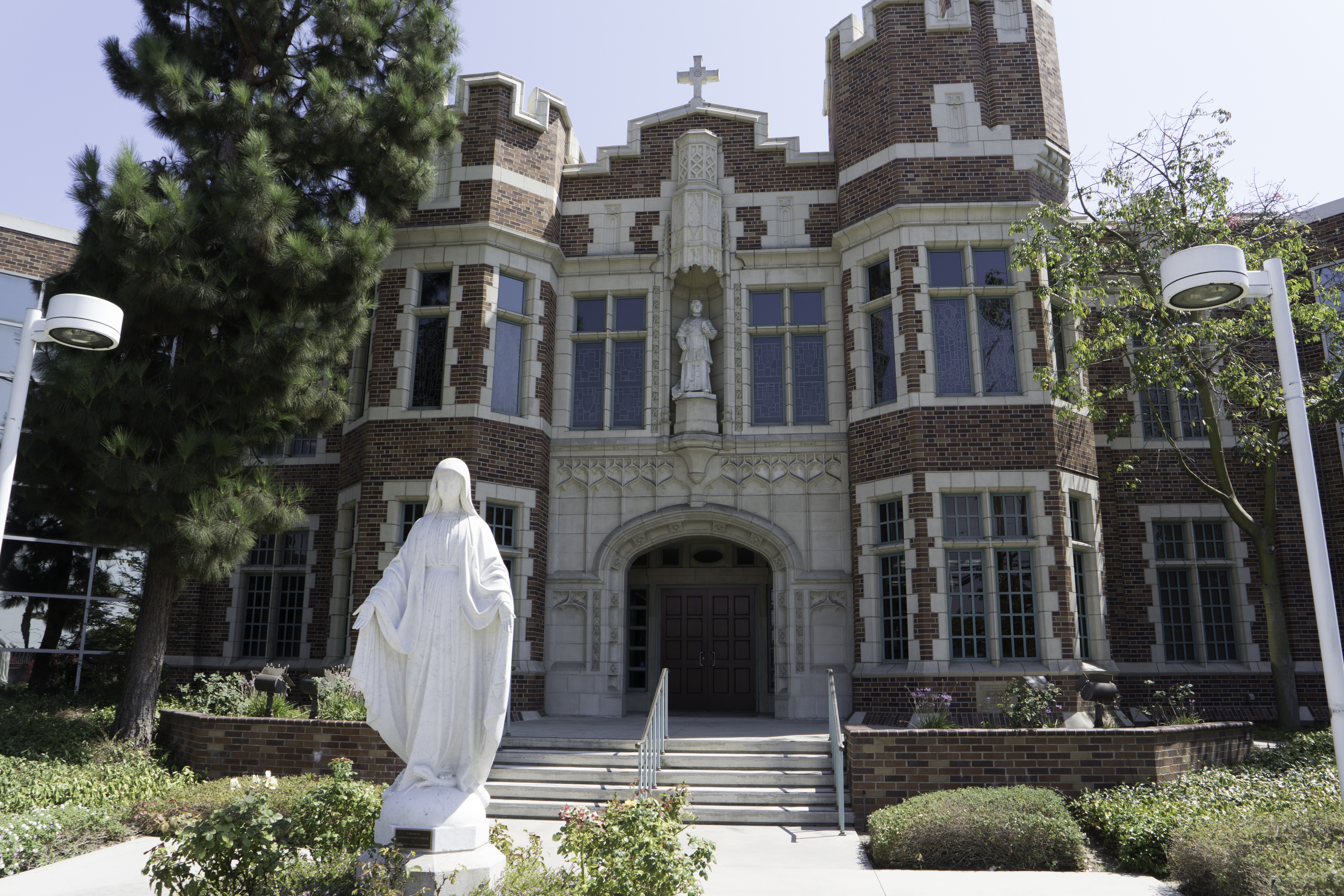

Location
- 2900 West Pico Boulevard; Byzantine-Latino Quarter, Los Angeles, Los Angeles County, California 90006; United States; 34°2′48″N 118°18′12″W

Information
- Type: Private, All-Female
- Religious affiliation: Roman Catholic
- Established: 1923
- Status: Open
- Principal: Robyn Carroll
- Grades: 9-12
- Colors: White and Maroon
- Athletics conference: Horizon League; CIF Southern Section
- Mascot: Wendy the Wildcat
- Team name: Wildcats
- Accreditation: Western Association of Schools and Colleges
- Tuition: $9,825 (2024-2025)
- Athletic Director: Daiman Johnson
- Website: bishopconatyloretto.org

Bishop Conaty-Our Lady of Loretto High School is a Catholic, archdiocesan, all-female high school located in the Byzantine-Latino Quarter of Los Angeles, California. It is located in the Roman Catholic Archdiocese of Los Angeles. It is the First Catholic Archdiocesan all girls high school in the Los Angeles area.

== History ==
John Joseph Cantwell founded Los Angeles Catholic Girls’ High School in 1923. The faculty was composed of nuns from six Religious Orders: Sisters of the Immaculate Heart of Mary, Sisters of St. Joseph of Carondelet, Sisters of Mercy, Sisters of the Holy Cross, Sisters of the Presentation of Mary and Sisters of Loretto. This collaboration combined the strength of many teaching sisterhoods and maintained Catholic education at its highest standard. The Sisters of Charity of the Blessed Virgin Mary (BVMs) from Dubuque, Iowa, served at the school from 1940 to 1965. The school was dedicated in memory of Thomas James Conaty in recognition of his zeal for Catholic education. The school was renamed Bishop Conaty Memorial High School in 1955.

Our Lady of Loretto High School was opened in September, 1949 during the episcopate of James Francis McIntyre. Cardinal McIntyre had just begun a building campaign for Catholic high schools throughout the Archdiocese. Our Lady of Loretto was the first school to be opened during this campaign. During its forty-year history, the school offered a curriculum of studies that challenged young women to meet their educational goals and to reach their fullest potential.

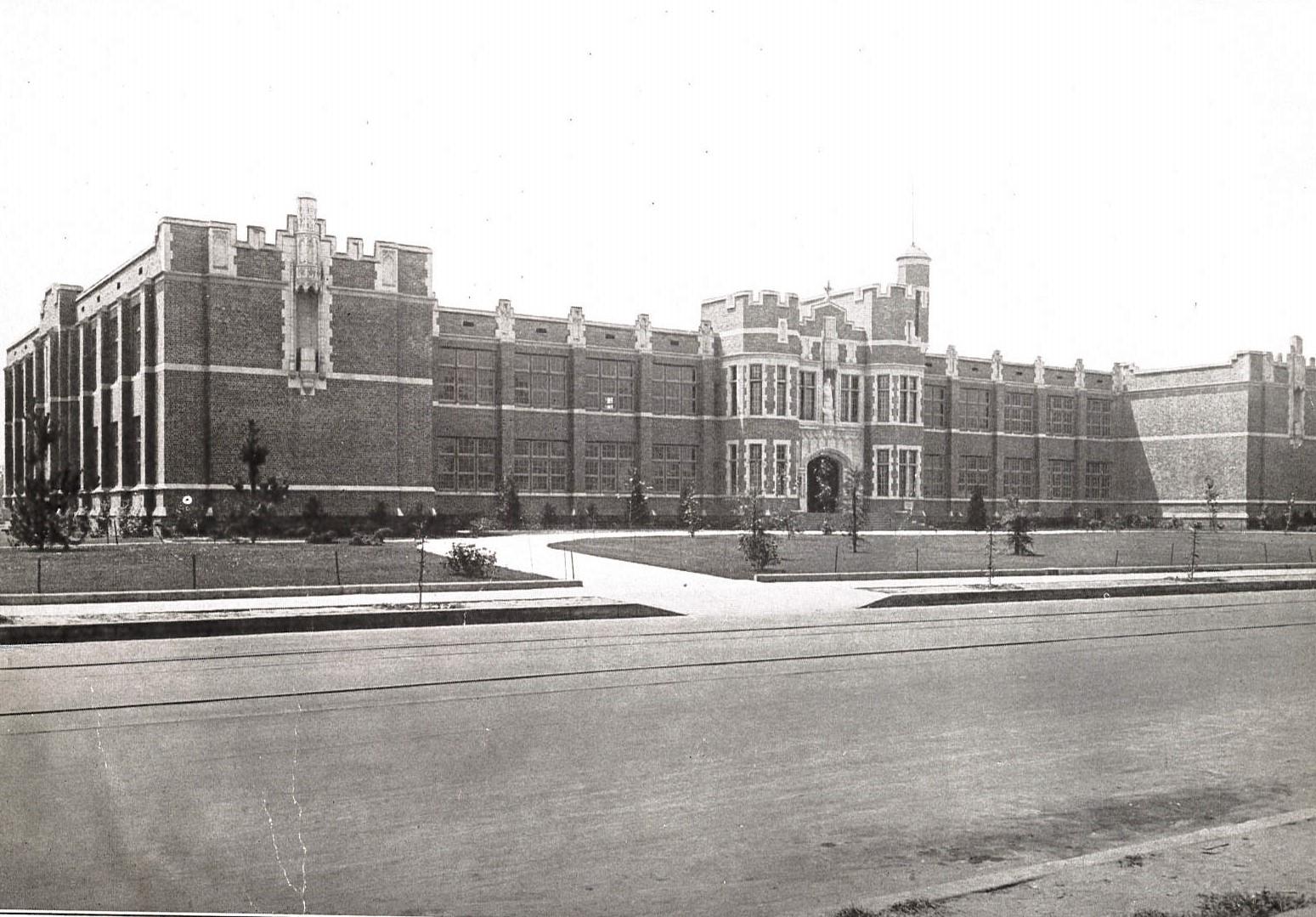
Catholic Girls' High School 1924

Changing community and times necessitated merging two schools to enable the Archdiocese to preserve the mission it began in 1923. In July, 1994 the school was officially named Bishop Conaty – Our Lady of Loretto High School. Over the years, the strengths, Christian mission and traditions developed, preparing young women for their roles in the world.

== Location ==
The school is located at 2900 West Pico Boulevard in the Byzantine-Latino Quarter of Los Angeles.

It is one block from both Saint Sophia Cathedral and St. Thomas the Apostle Catholic Church and a short walk from Loyola High School.

== Music Academy ==
In 2022, the school established a Music Academy, introducing students to Ensemble Performance, Contemporary Music, Music Production and Live Event Production - recording engineering and live sound. The academy is staffed by an Artist in Residence program, giving the students opportunities to learn from professional touring musicians and engineers.

The academy strives to educate girls in areas of the industry that are predominantly male dominated and has seen enormous success, particularly in the areas of Music Technology.

In 2024, the Academy won a Best Communities for Music Education award from the NAMM foundation.

== Space Academy ==
In 2023, the school established a gifted and talented program, specializing in the fields of computer engineering and robotics. This has extended into partnerships with Nasa and their Nasa Sparx curriculum. The school now offers classes in Astrobiology and other space related fields as well as visits to the Jet Propulsion Laboratory in Pasadena, CA.

== Athletics ==
The school has a strong athletics department participating in the following sports - Volleyball, Sand Volleyball, Golf, Track and Field, Cross Country, Basketball, Softball and Soccer.

In 2022 a Cheer team was introduced at the competitive level and immediately found success in winning Best Routine and Best Dress and the Sharp International Cheer Competitions in both 2023 and 2024.

Basketball: Horizon League Champions 2001, 2002, 2005, 2006, 2007, 2008, 2012, 2013, 2014, 2015, 2016, 2017, 2019; CIF Southern Section Division Finalist 2007, 2019

Volleyball: Horizon League Champions 2001, 2002, 2003, 2004, 2006, 2014, 2015, 2017; CIF Southern Section Division Finalist 2008, 2013

Soccer: Horizon League Champions 2012, 2014

== Notable Alumnae ==
- Frances (Corita) Kent, class of 1936, educator, artist
- Sr. Callista Roy, class of 1957, nurse theorist
- Pilar Seurat (Rita Hernandez), class of 1957, actress
- Marilyn White, class of 1962, Olympian
- Adrienne Fuzee, class of 1968, artist, curator
- Maria Elena Salinas, class of 1973, journalist
