= St. Thomas the Apostle Catholic Church (Los Angeles) =

Coordinates: 34°02′48″N 118°17′56″W

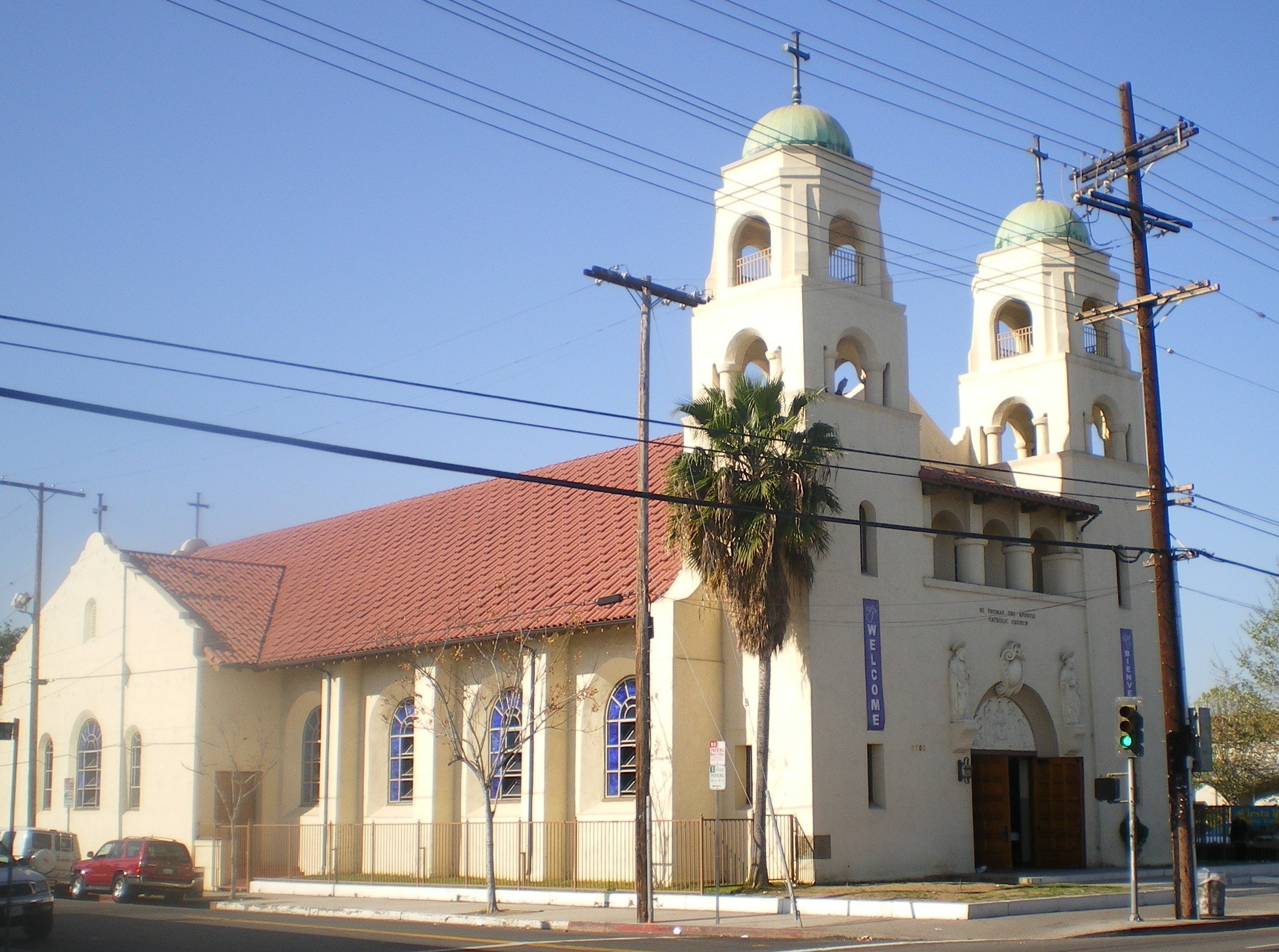
- St. Thomas the Apostle Catholic Church
- Location: 2727 W. Pico Blvd; Los Angeles, California
- Country: USA
- Denomination: Roman Catholic
- Website: www.saintthomasla.org

History
- Founded: Parish founded in August 1903
- Dedicated: Church building dedicated February 19, 1905

Architecture
- Architect: Maginnis, Walsh and Sullivan
- Architectural type: Mission Revival Style architecture

Administration
- Division: Our Lady of the Angels Pastoral Region
- Diocese: Archdiocese of Los Angeles

Clergy
- Archbishop: José Horacio Gómez
- Bishop: Edward W. Clark
- Pastor: Fr.Mario Torres

St. Thomas the Apostle Catholic Church is a Roman Catholic church and parish in the Los Angeles Archdiocese, Our Lady of the Angels Pastoral Region. The church is located at 2727 W. Pico Boulevard in the Byzantine-Latino Quarter of Los Angeles, California. The Mission Revival style church was built in 1904.

== Early history ==
In the Spring of 1903, Bishop Thomas James Conaty took over as the bishop of the diocese of Los Angeles. In his first months as bishop, Bishop Conaty outlined a plan for expansion of the church in Los Angeles. He quickly acquired land to build a cathedral and three new parish churches—St. Thomas the Apostle, St. Patrick and St. Agnes. For St. Thomas, three lots were purchased in August 1903 at the southwest corner of Pico Boulevard and Hobston Street.

The land acquired for St. Thomas was in a desirable and expanding residential section of the city then known as "Pico Heights" to the southwest of Downtown Los Angeles. The Los Angeles Times noted that the church would enhance property values in the area:

"Property values in the vicinity will be greatly enhanced by the handsome structure. Situated in a choice residential section, it will be a landmark around which will cluster many stately homes."

The first mass for the new St. Thomas the Apostle parish was held on August 16, 1903 in the chapel of the Immacualte Heart Convent in Pico Heights. An old Methodist church structure was purchased in late 1903 or early 1904 to serve as a temporary parish church until construction of a new church could be completed.

Father D.W.J. Murphy was assigned to the parish in its earliest days. The Los Angeles Times described Father Murphy as "a young and energetic man" who would "devote all his time to building up the Church of St. Thomas the Apostle." Within a few months of the formation of the parish, Father John J. Clifford was appointed as the first pastor, and Father Murphy became its deacon.

On June 12, 1904, the cornerstone for the new church was laid in a ceremony conducted by Bishop Conaty. The Los Angeles Times described the "pomp and reverence" with which the ceremony was conducted: "After the corner-stone was placed, a ceremony seldom witnessed in these prosaic days followed. Like the Israelites of old marching around the walls of the city, marched the retinue of priests clad in their vestments, chanting their songs of praise to God."

The church structure was completed in December 1904 at a cost of $30,000, and was opened on Christmas Day 1904. At the time of the first service, the interior had not been completed. The pews were installed one week earlier, and a temporary altar was used.

The formal dedication ceremonies for the church occurred on February 19, 1905. The ceremonies began with a procession of a "long train of acolytes" headed by a cross-bearer, followed by numerous priests from the region, then followed by Bishop Conaty and his attendants. After circling the entire building, the bishop sprinkled holy water on the corners and lintels. The procession then moved into the church where a high mass was led by Bishop Conaty. That evening, solemn vespers were sung in the church; the music consisted of Gregorian chants sung by a choir of 30 priests.

== Architecture ==
The church building has been described as being in the Mission Revival or Spanish Renaissance style. The original 1905 structure had "massive walls supported by buttresses, similar to the old cathedrals of the land of Castile." The original altar also carried out the idea of mission architecture with its use of arches and mission style domes. The formal lines of the front of the church were broken by two statutes and a spandrel bas relief over the main entrance. The bas-relief depicted the Apostle Thomas touching the side of Jesus, and was designed by Hugh Cairns of Boston. The Los Angeles Times in December 1904 noted that the newly erected mission-style structure was "pleasing in effect and commodious in arrangement."

The architects responsible for the design of the original church were Maginnis, Walsh and Sullivan of Boston. The contractor was Andrew McNally of the Pioneer Building Company.

When drawings were unveiled for the church in 1904, the Los Angeles Times reported:

"While the interior appointments of the new church will be modern and strictly down to date, the style of architecture dear to the hearts of the old mission padres will be carried out as to the exterior. There will be massive towers and arched porticos, strongly suggestive of the days of Ramona, Father Salvadiera and the old Spanish missions of Santa Barbara, San Luis Rey and San Diego."

Upon the dedication of the church, the Los Angeles Times again emphasized the connection between the Mission style design and the traditions of the Catholic Church in California:

"Like a link binding the vigorous present to the dreamy past -- the past of missions and their brown-habited padres establishing their adobe edifices for the worship of God, was the dedication of the beautiful mission-style Church of St. Thomas the Apostle, yesterday, at Pico Heights. In its character this church unites itself with the days of the humble followers of St. Francis, as it is the same form and the same faith, is to a great degree of the same style of architecture and is carried on by the same authority as that of the olden days."

== St. Thomas the Apostle School ==
The parish of St. Thomas the Apostle also operates an elementary school for grades kindergarten through the eighth grade. In 1993, President Bill Clinton designated the school as a National Blue Ribbon School of Excellence. At that time, the Los Angeles Times published a feature story about the school calling it "a little jewel of a school in the inner city" and noting the high morale among teachers, students and parents.

In June 2008, the St. Thomas the Apostle School broke ground for a new $15.4 million education campus. The project includes renovation of the existing school building and new facilities, including a 500-seat multi-purpose room and assembly hall, library, science and art classroom, playground, and semi-subterranean and ground level parking.
