= Byzantine-Latino Quarter, Los Angeles =

Byzantine-Latino Quarter
- Neighborhood of Los Angeles
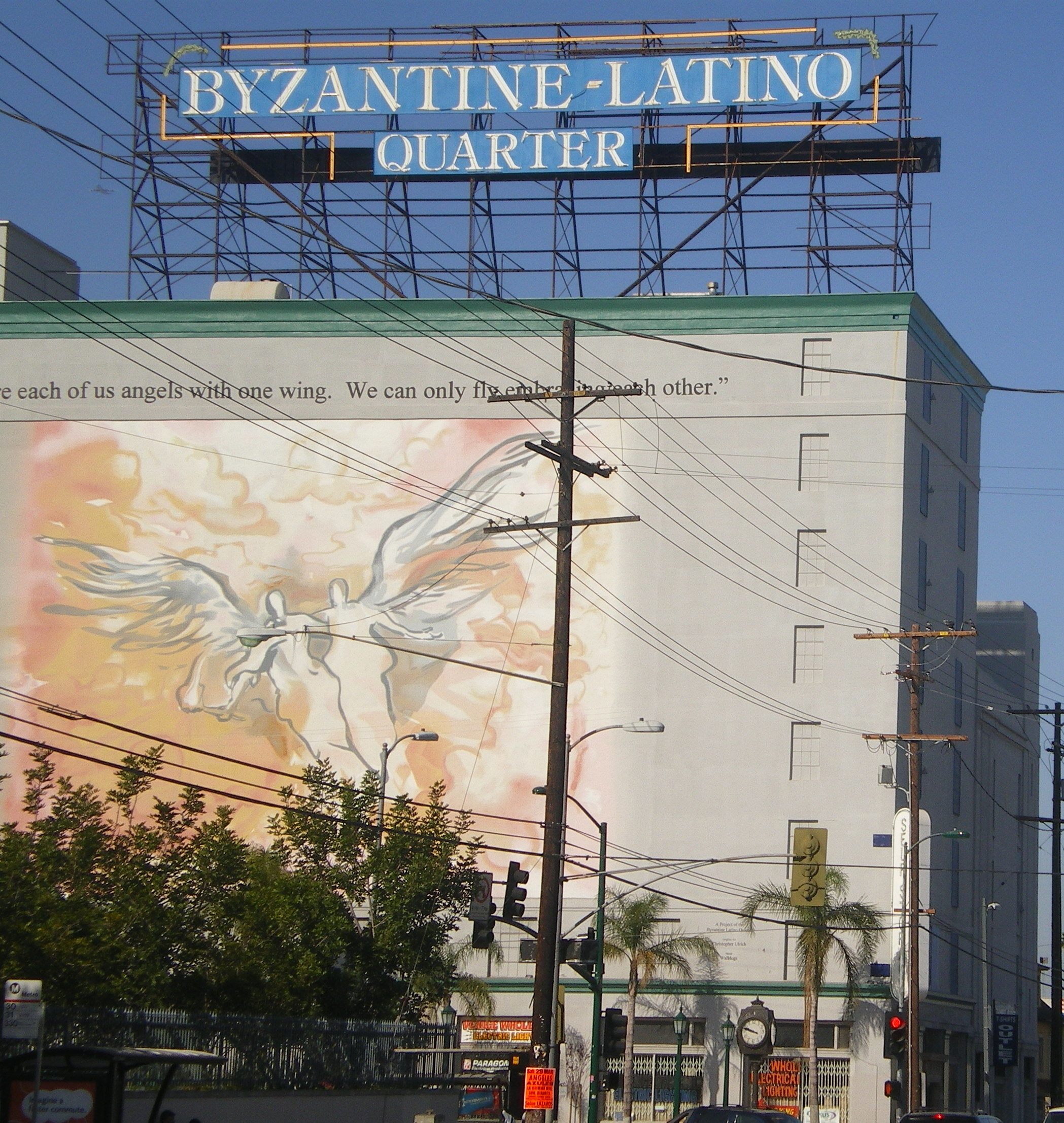
- Byzantine-Latino Quarter Signage, 2012

- Location within Central Los Angeles
- Coordinates: 34.047232°N 118.300018°W
- Country: United States
- State: California
- County: Los Angeles
- City: Los Angeles
- Time zone: UTC-8 (PST)
  - Summer (DST): UTC-7 (PDT)
- Zip Code: 90006
- Area code: 323

The Byzantine-Latino Quarter is a neighborhood in Central Los Angeles.

== History ==
The Byzantine-Latino Quarter, alternately referred to as the "BLQ", was originally developed as "Pico Heights" in 1886 by the Electric Railway Homestead Association. A fashionable community of stately Craftsman homes and wealthy families, the area was annexed by the City of Los Angeles in 1896. By the 1920s, wealthy residents began moving out of the neighborhood to areas farther from the city center. During the 1930s and 1940s, the neighborhood became a destination for European immigrants. The neighborhood was known as “Greek Town” for its concentration of Greek residents and businesses. The Greek community was centered primarily around Pico and Normandie, adjacent to the St. Sophia Greek Orthodox Cathedral, which opened in 1952. During the 1970s, large numbers of Mexican immigrants settled in the neighborhood. In the 1980s, Central American immigrants primarily from El Salvador, Guatemala, and Honduras moved in.

During the 1990s, local residents, community activists, faith leaders, and business owners formed a coalition and developed a community plan to revitalize the neighborhood. They wanted a name for the neighborhood, separate and distinct from the Pico-Union district. Instead of resurrecting the neighborhood's historic name, they proposed a new name: the Byzantine-Latino Quarter.

In 1997, the area was designated the “Byzantine-Latino Quarter” by the California State Assembly and the Department of Transportation installed street markers.

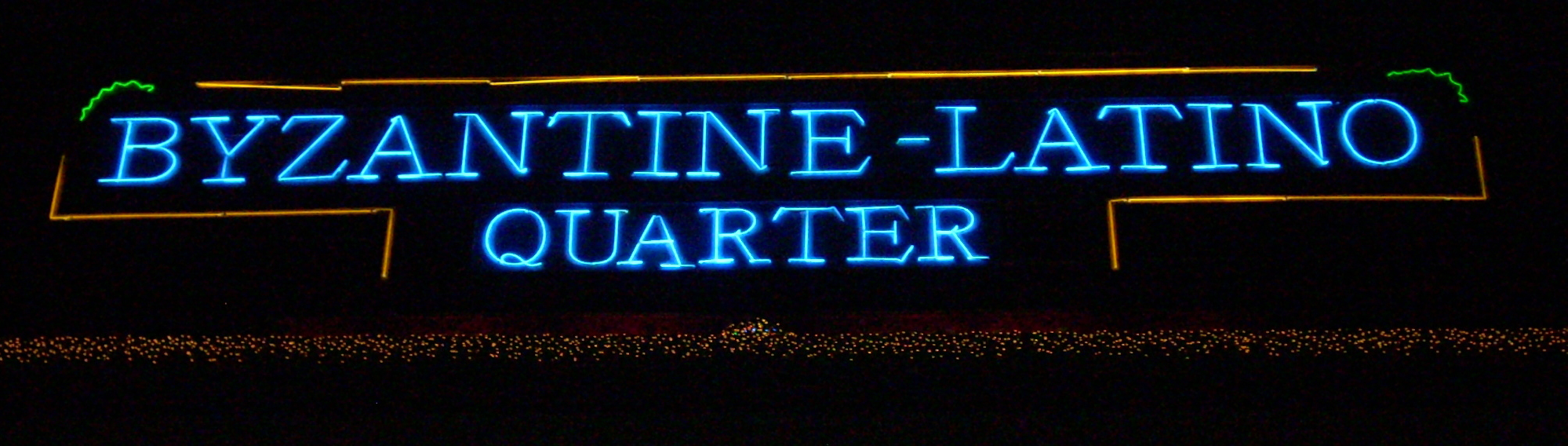
Neon signage at night, 2009

== Geography ==
The Byzantine-Latino Quarter is roughly bounded by 11th Street on the north, Venice Boulevard on the south, Hobart Boulevard on the west and Alvarado Street on the east.

== Business Improvement District ==
In 2003, the Byzantine-Latino Quarter Business Improvement District (BLQ BID), was approved and adopted by the Los Angeles City Council. It was developed in conjunction with LANI (Los Angeles Neighborhood Initiative). The BID is responsible for maintenance of the large neon sign (which reads Byzantine Latino-Quarter) that sits on the roof of a building on Pico Boulevard and Normandie Avenue.

== Landmarks and attractions ==
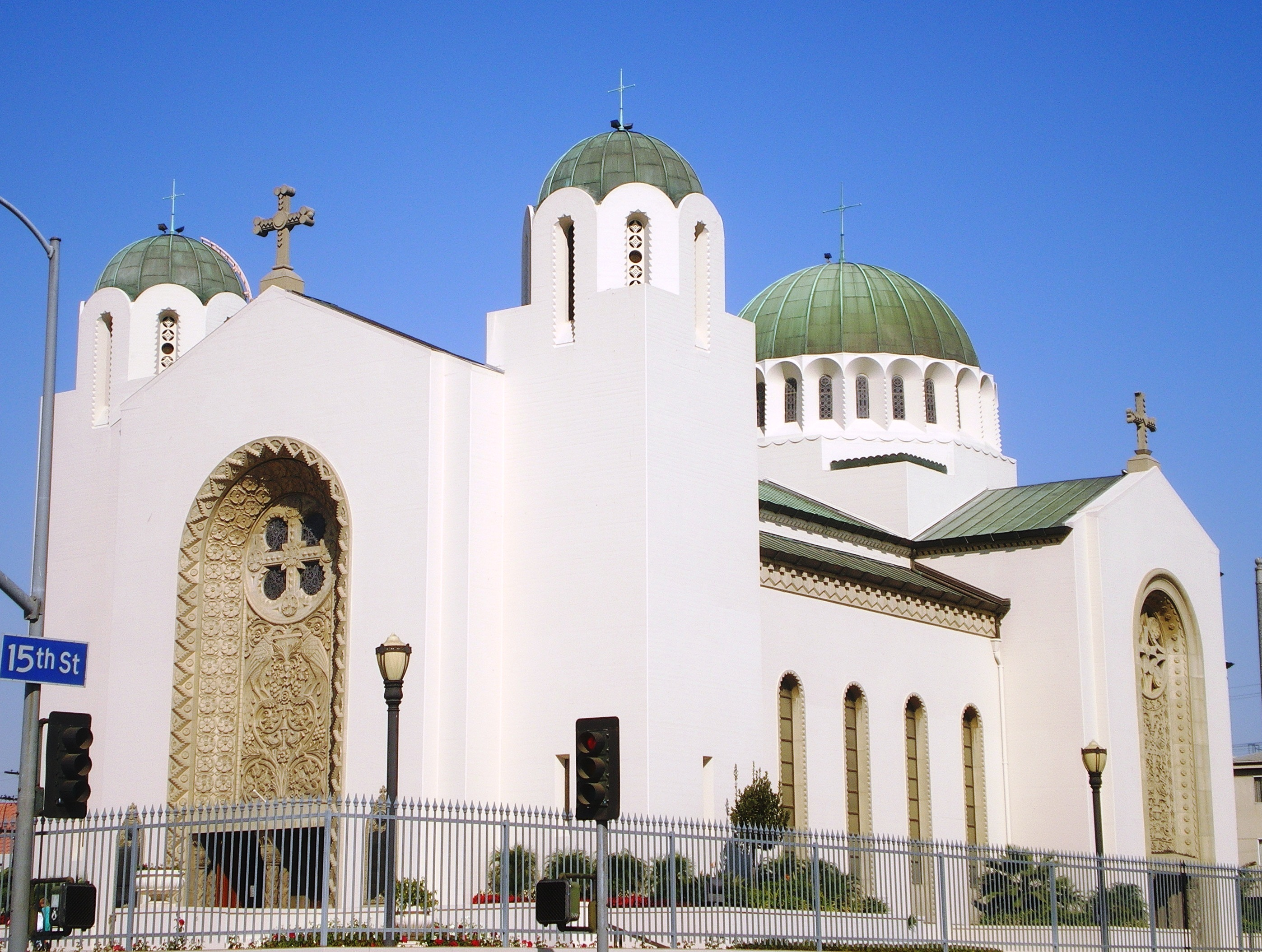
Saint Sophia Greek Orthodox Cathedral

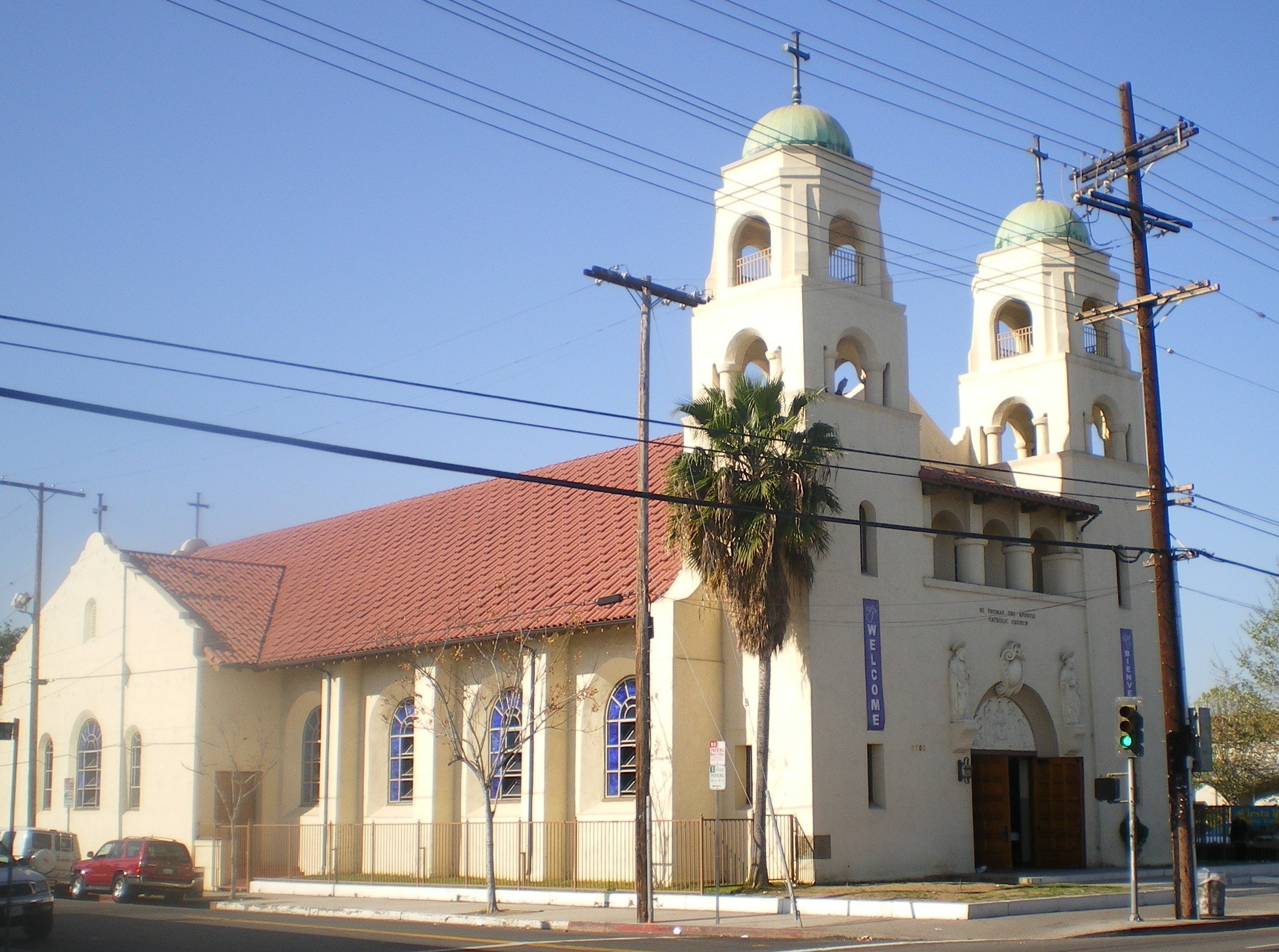
Saint Thomas the Apostle Church

- Saint Sophia Cathedral
- St. Thomas the Apostle Catholic Church

== Education ==
Schools operating within the boundaries of the Byzantine-Latino Quarter are:

- Bishop Conaty-Our Lady of Loretto High School - 2900 Pico Boulevard
- The Jane B. Eisner Middle School - 2755 W. 15th Street

== Events ==
- LAGreekFest - an annual event
