= Saint Sophia Cathedral, Los Angeles =

Coordinates: 34°02′45″N 118°18′00″W

Saint Sophia Greek Orthodox Cathedral
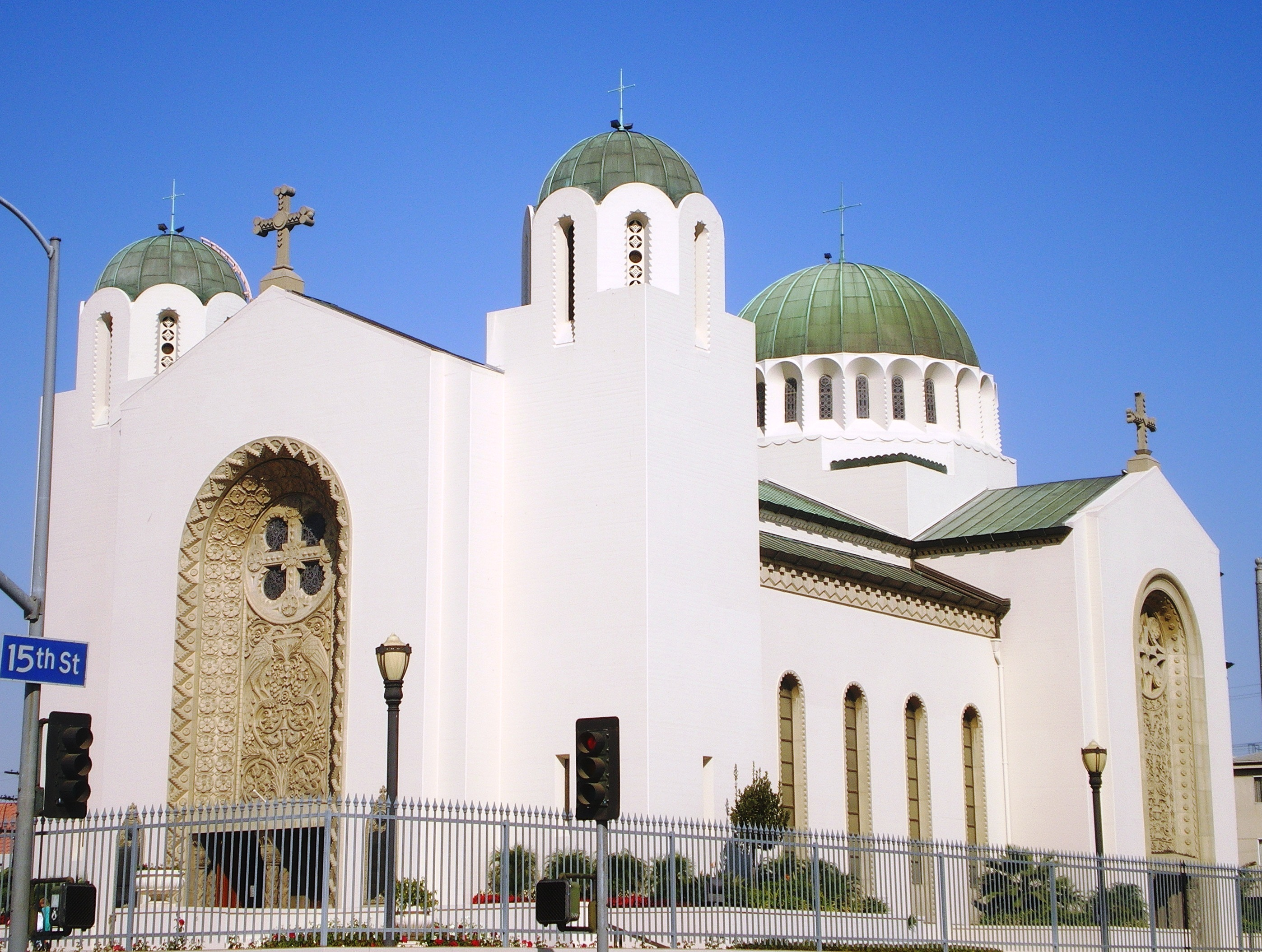
- Saint Sophia Greek Orthodox Cathedral, looking northeast
- Saint Sophia; Greek Orthodox Cathedral
- Location: 1324 S. Normandie Avenue, Byzantine-Latino Quarter; Los Angeles, California
- Country: United States
- Denomination: Greek Orthodox
- Website: www.saintsophia.org

History
- Status: Active

Architecture
- Heritage designation: Los Angeles Historic-Cultural Monument #120
- Designated: June 6, 1973
- Style: Byzantine Revival—Renaissance Revival
- Completed: 1952

Specifications
- Capacity: 750

Administration
- Metropolis: San Francisco
- Archdiocese: America

Saint Sophia Greek Orthodox Cathedral (in Greek: Ἁγία Σοφία, Hagia Sophia) is a Greek Orthodox church built in 1952, in what was then the Greek section of Central Los Angeles, California. It is located at West 15th Street and South Normandie Avenue in the Byzantine-Latino Quarter

== History ==
This Greek Orthodox church is the result of a Hollywood success story. When Charles Skouras and his brothers, Spyros Skouras and George Skouras, were still trying to get ahead in Hollywood, Charles made a vow to God that he would build the "most majestic cathedral if God would grant him success in show business." He became head of Fox West Coast, so he built the Saint Sophia in Los Angeles.

In 2005 at the 36th Biennial Clergy-Laity Congress of the Greek Orthodox Archdiocese of America, the liturgy was given in Spanish, English, and Greek, with Orthodox children from a Tijuana, Mexico, orphanage providing music.

== Architecture ==
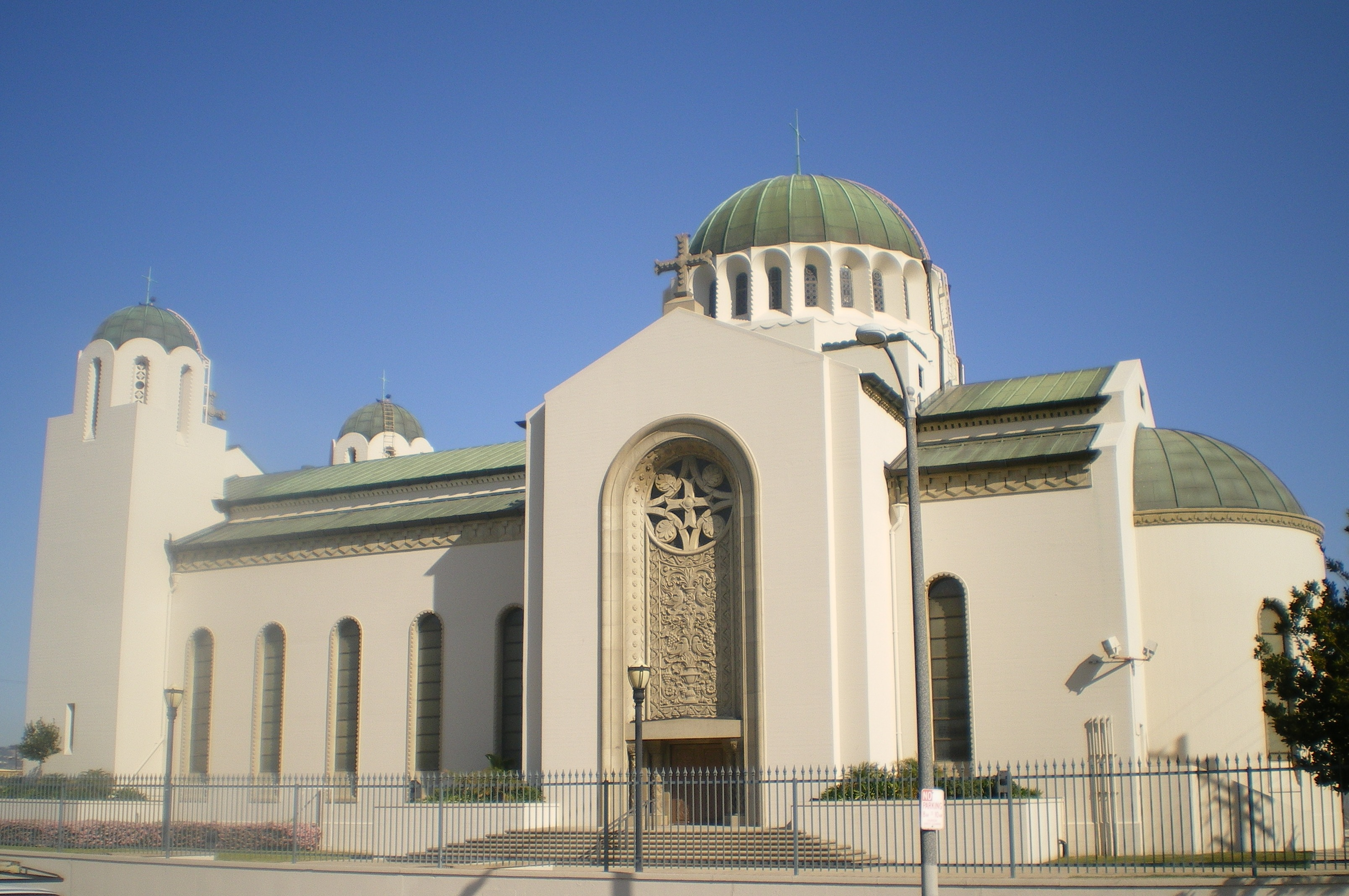
South façade

The cathedral has a simplified Byzantine Revival—Renaissance Revival-influenced exterior. The interior was designed with more decorative features.

Saint Sophia Cathedral is a Los Angeles Historic-Cultural Monument.

== Congregation ==
The cathedral still draws its predominantly Greek congregation of as many as 1,000 from perhaps a 60-mile radius – from throughout Los Angeles and Orange Counties. Los Angeles's Greek community has never been centralized, as in other cities such as New York City and Chicago.

Members of the church congregation have included Hollywood actors such as Telly Savalas, whose funeral was held there. Dr. Tom Apostle and Sharon Lawrence married at the church in 2002.

=== Notable members ===
- George Chakiris
- Telly Savalas
- Tom Hanks
- Rita Wilson
- Peggy Stevenson — Los Angeles City Council member, 1975–1985.

== In popular culture ==
The church is featured in Visiting... with Huell Howser Episode 511.

The wedding scene in Bram Stoker's Dracula was filmed in the nave of this church. In rapper Ice Cube's 1993 music video "It Was a Good Day", the church can be seen in the background of the basketball scene.

The church featured in Season 3, Episode 10 of Nip/Tuck (“Madison Berg”) as the location for Christian and Kimber's wedding.

== See also ==
- List of Los Angeles Historic-Cultural Monuments in South Los Angeles
- Greek Orthodox cathedrals in the United States
