= West Hollywood Memorial Walk =

Memorial and landmark in California, US

Coordinates: 34°5′23″N 118°22′33″W

West Hollywood Memorial Walk (Memorial Walk) is a memorial and landmark in West Hollywood, California, along the sidewalks of Santa Monica Boulevard between Fairfax Avenue and Doheny Drive, at the eastern border of the City of Beverly Hills. Bronze plaques engraved with the names of those who died from acquired immune deficiency syndrome (AIDS) are embedded in the sidewalk as a tribute. Funds from the purchase of plaques support the programs of California non-profit Aid For AIDS to assist impoverished people in Los Angeles County living with HIV/AIDS.

== History ==
The Memorial Walk was jointly developed by the California-based non-profit organization, Aid For AIDS, and the City of West Hollywood. Funds from the purchase of plaques support Aid For AIDS programs to assist impoverished people in Los Angeles County living with HIV/AIDS. Initiated in 1993 as The West Hollywood Palms Project, the landmark was renamed The West Hollywood Memorial Walk, and, in 2003, a keystone was installed by The City of West Hollywood at the northwest triangle at Santa Monica Boulevard and Crescent Heights Boulevard.

== The plaques ==
Loved ones eligible for a bronze plaque on the West Hollywood Memorial Walk are those who have died and were HIV-positive. Among the most-notable memorialized by a plaque is the actor Rock Hudson, who died of AIDS in 1985. The placement of Hudson's plaque on Santa Monica Boulevard was coordinated by actress Elizabeth Taylor, his co-star in the film, Giant.

Names and locations of the plaques can be found at the Aid For AIDS website.

== See also ==
- AIDS Memorial Grove
