= Beverly Center =

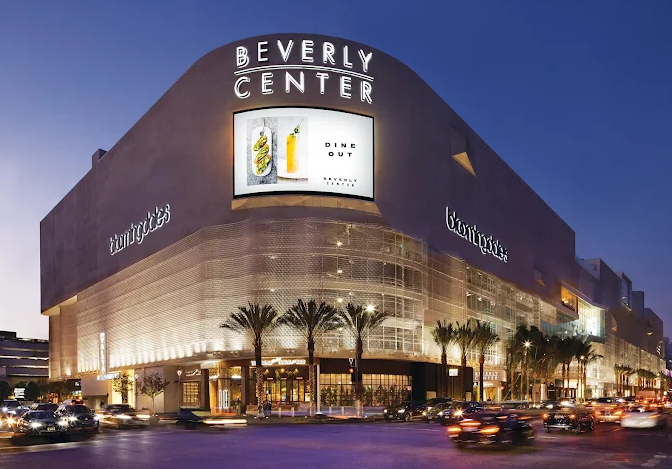
- Location: Los Angeles, California, U.S. 90048
- Coordinates: 34.075°N 118.377°W
- Address: 8500 Beverly Blvd
- Opened: February 4, 1982; 44 years ago
- Developer: A. Alfred Taubman, Sheldon Gordon & E. Phillip Lyon
- Manager: Simon Property Group
- Owner: Simon Property Group
- Architect: Lou Nardorf of Welton Becket and Associates (original), Massimiliano Fuksas and Doriana O. Mandrelli (2018 renovation)
- Num. of stores: 100+
- Num. of anchor tenants: 2
- Floor area: 883,000 sq ft (82,000 m^{2})
- Floors: 8
- Website: simon.com/mall/beverly-center

The Beverly Center is a shopping mall in Los Angeles, California, United States. It is an eight-story structure bounded by Beverly Boulevard, La Cienega Boulevard, 3rd Street, and San Vicente Boulevard. The mall's anchor stores are Bloomingdale's and Macy's.

== History ==
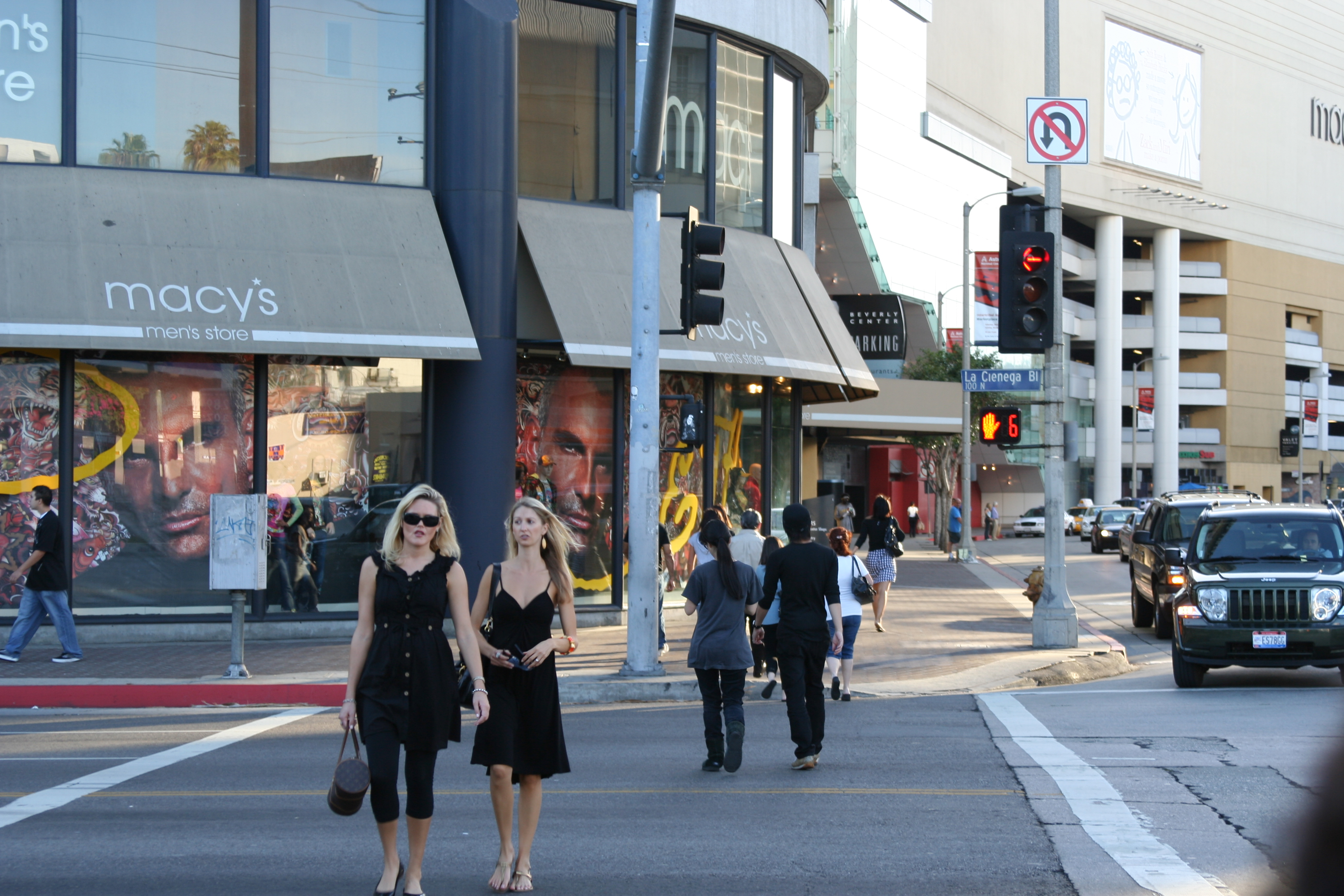
Beverly Center at the corner of La Cienega Boulevard and Beverly Boulevard

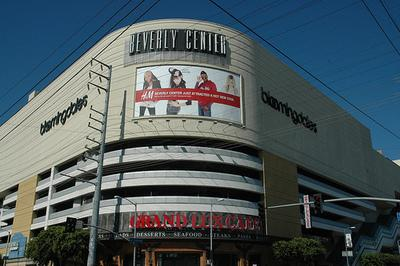
View from the intersection of La Cienega Blvd. and 3rd St, prior to renovations

The site was formerly occupied by Beverly Park, a small amusement park featuring a Ferris wheel, merry-go-round, mini roller-coaster, and a pony ride called "Ponyland".

The Beverly Center opened on February 4, 1982. It was built, at a cost of $100 million, by developers A. Alfred Taubman, Sheldon Gordon, and E. Phillip Lyon. The mall was anchored by Bullock's and The Broadway department stores. Because of the small size of the plot of land, the mall was built entirely atop its own multi-story parking garage. The northeast corner of the mall, at the intersection of Beverly and La Cienega Boulevards, is the geographic center of the city's studio zone.

The mall's unusual shape and lack of street frontage along San Vicente Boulevard are the result of both its position at the intersection of a number of angled streets and its location above the Salt Lake Oil Field. As of 2020, the western portion of the mall property contained a cluster of oil wells, including 45 active wells and 16 idle wells, operated by Freeport-McMoRan (formally Plains Exploration & Production.

On July 16, 1982, the Cineplex Beverly Center 14 opened. The 14-screen multiplex was the largest in the US at the time. The opening was national news and was covered in The New York Times. In the late 1980s, three smaller screens were removed on the main floor, so two larger auditoriums could be built on the roof.

On October 24, 1982, America's first and the world's second Hard Rock Cafe opened on the ground level of the mall. It closed on December 31, 2006.

In 1989, Terence Conran's Habitat, a high-end British furniture company, opened an anchor store on the mall's ground level. It closed in 1993 and was converted later that year to Bullock's Men's Store. In 1996, Bullock's became Macy's and the Bullock's and Bullock's Men's Store anchors became Macy's and the Macy's Men's Store. The Broadway closed in 1996, when it too was absorbed into Macy's, and reopened in 1997, after renovations, as Bloomingdale's.

In 2004, Taubman Centers, the public Real Estate Investment Trust and successor to A. Alfred Taubman's shopping center interests, purchased its partners minority investments stake in the property.

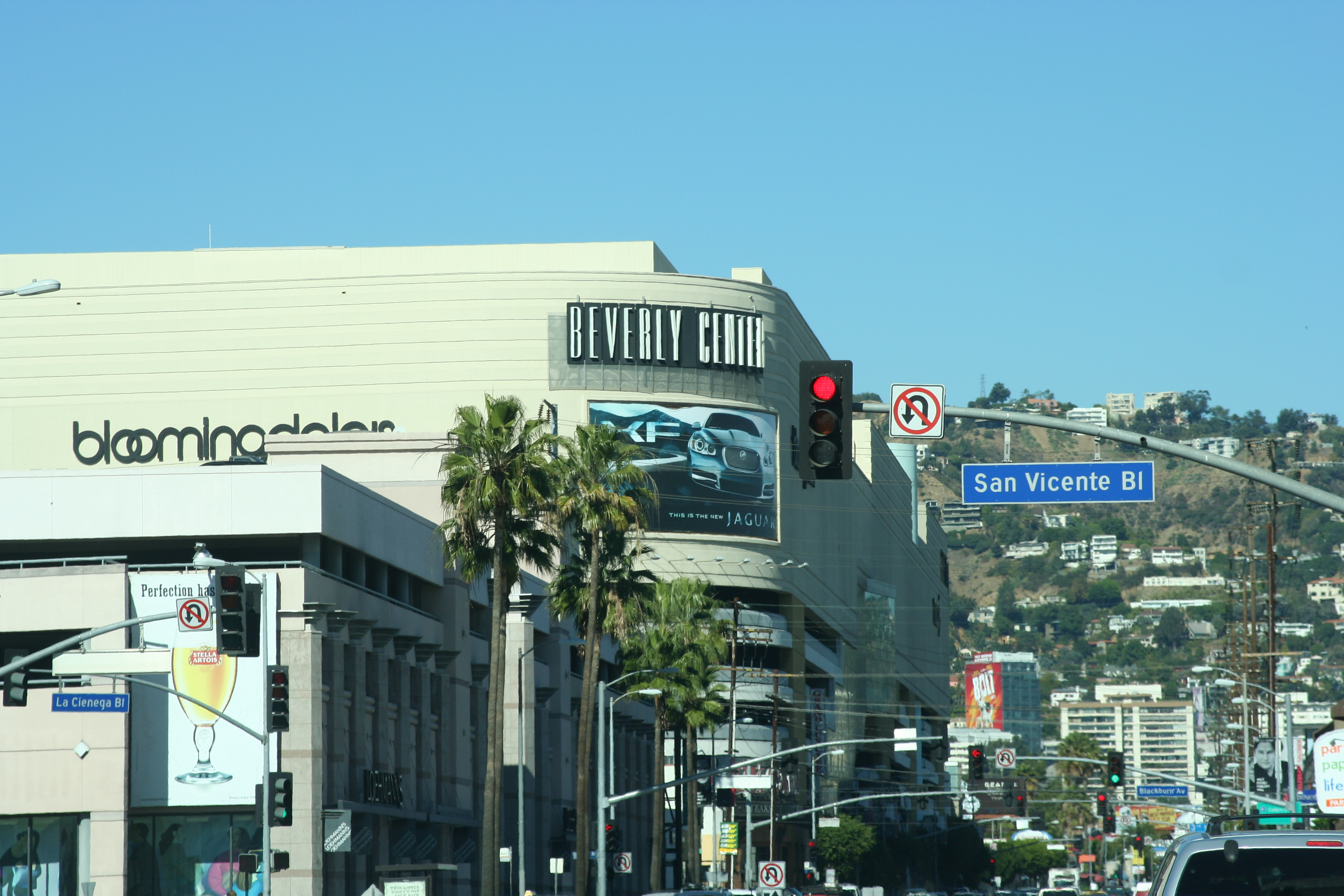
Beverly Center and West Hollywood Hills

The cinema closed in January 2006, as a result of the Loews/AMC merger. The theater reopened in February 2006, operated by Mann Theatres. It closed again in August 2009, and reopened again in September 2009, operated by Rave Motion Pictures. The theater closed permanently on June 3, 2010.

The Beverly Center underwent a renovation from 2006 to 2008. These renovations included reconstructing the escalators visible from the outside.

A food court operated at the mall until 2014, when it was eliminated. Uniqlo opened one of its first Southern California locations in the space. As part of renovations starting in 2016, the mall aims to bring restaurants back to the empty spaces on the street level.

Starting in March 2016, the Center underwent a major renovation that aimed to add a food hall and several new street-level restaurants and a skylight. Renovation costs were given as US$500 million. The renovations added a perforated steel facade on the outside of the building and an upgraded parking structure which includes technology to help drivers remember where they've parked.

Macy's Men's Store closed around 2021, and the space was converted to a Gold's Gym and a Lucky Strike Lanes bowling alley.

In November 2025, Taubman Realty Group and its assets, including Beverly Center, was acquired by Simon Property Group.

== In popular culture ==
- In the 1977 David Lynch film Eraserhead, industrial wasteland scenes were shot at the present location of Beverly Center. Prior to its current state of development, part of the site was an oil field.
- A chapter in the 1985 Bret Easton Ellis novel Less than Zero is set in The Beverly Center.
- Exterior shots for the 1986 low-budget horror film Chopping Mall were filmed along the Beverly Center - mainly along La Cienega Boulevard.
- Beverly Center was the setting of the 1991 film Scenes from a Mall starring Bette Midler and Woody Allen. The movie's interior mall scenes were filmed between the Beverly Center and Stamford Town Center in Connecticut, another Taubman mall.
- Beverly Center played a part of the plot near the end of the 1997 disaster thriller Volcano starring Tommy Lee Jones and Anne Heche. A triage and childcare center for neighboring Cedars-Sinai Medical Center was set up in the mall's Hard Rock Cafe. This was evacuated when a geyser of lava erupted out of San Vicente Boulevard, threatening the structure and its occupants.
- Beverly Center was shown briefly in the 1997 film Selena, where Selena (played by actress Jennifer Lopez) and her friend went shopping at an upscale store in the mall before Selena attended the Grammy Awards.
- On May 18, 2009, rap artist Dolla was fatally shot at the Beverly Center.
- On the 2013 SNL sketch "Waking Up With Kimye", Lady Gaga plays an Apple Store employee at the mall who works at the Genius Bar.
- Appears in the video game Grand Theft Auto V as "Rockford Plaza"
- Referenced by musician Lana Del Rey in her song "Sweet" on the 2023 studio album Did You Know That There's a Tunnel Under Ocean Blvd?
- Appears in the 2023 music video for Super Graphic Ultra Modern Girl by Chappell Roan
- Appears in the 2025 music video for Sally, When the Wine Runs Out by Role Model

== See also ==
- Zev Yaroslavsky, Los Angeles City Council member (1974–94) who voted in favor of building the Beverly Center
- Studio zone—The Beverly Center is located at the intersection that marks the center of this zone, considered "local" by Los Angeles–area entertainment industry labor unions.
- Yardbird Southern Table & Bar, located inside the Beverly Center
- List of largest shopping malls in the United States
