= Colors (1988 film) =

1988 film directed by Dennis Hopper

- Original film poster
- Directed by: Dennis Hopper
- Screenplay by: Michael Schiffer
- Story by: Michael Schiffer; Richard Di Lello
- Produced by: Robert H. Solo
- Starring: Sean Penn; Robert Duvall; María Conchita Alonso
- Cinematography: Haskell Wexler
- Edited by: Robert Estrin
- Music by: Herbie Hancock
- Distributed by: Orion Pictures
- Release date: April 15, 1988
- Running time: 120 min. (original release); 127 min. (Director's Cut)
- Country: United States
- Languages: English; Spanish
- Budget: $10 million
- Box office: $46,616,067 (domestic)

Colors is a 1988 American crime drama film starring Sean Penn and Robert Duvall, and directed by Dennis Hopper. The film takes place in the gang-ridden neighborhoods of Los Angeles: late-1980s South Central L.A., Echo Park, Westlake and East L.A.. The film centers on Bob Hodges (Duvall), an experienced LAPD C.R.A.S.H. officer, and his rookie partner, Danny McGavin (Penn), who try to stop the gang violence between the Bloods, the Crips, and Hispanic street gangs. Colors relaunched Hopper as a director 19 years after Easy Rider, and inspired discussion over its depiction of gang life and gang violence.

== Plot ==
Two policemen, "Uncle" Bob Hodges, a respected LAPD officer and Vietnam veteran, and rookie officer Danny McGavin, have just been teamed together in the C.R.A.S.H. unit that patrols Northwest L.A., East L.A. and South L.A..

Hodges' views on policing are appreciated on the local streets where he is outwardly diplomatic, preaching "rapport" to gang members and realizing the vulnerable gang populations scrutinize every action the police take. When a 21st Street gangster throws a rock at Hodges's car, Felipe is caught by Hodges. Elsewhere, the Bloods' funeral for Robert Craig is attacked by a carload of Crips. When Hodges and McGavin chase them, the Crips are killed when the car crashes. At the 21st Street Gang hangout, Ron Delaney fails to convince their members to walk away from the gang life.

McGavin has a short-lived romance with a waitress named Louisa, whose life lessons seem to be lost on the aggressive, cavalier rookie. McGavin assaults a graffiti artist with his own paint can and punches a drug dealer named T in front of angry bystanders. Hodges physically confronts McGavin about his abusive style, and Louisa reveals the graffiti artist is her cousin. The murder of a Bloods gang member escalates tension, and the two partners find themselves in the middle of the Crips, Bloods, and Hispanic barrio war. McGavin wrecks their first unmarked car during a pursuit, and its vivid yellow replacement earns McGavin the nickname "Pac-Man".

CRASH arrests a gang member named Oso who informs on drug dealers like Hi Top. Hodges and McGavin chase Hi Top after he steals a motorcycle and arrest him when he crashes through a restaurant window. McGavin apologizes to Hodges for his misconduct, and in response, Hodges tells McGavin that he will be getting a new partner at the beginning of next month. Hi Top is severely beaten in jail by other inmates and confesses that Rocket, leader of the Crips, is the killer of Robert Craig. Hodges, McGavin, and the LAPD arrest and question two black males about a dark van used in the killing. Trying to find Rocket, the police raid his girlfriend's house and Officer Baines kills a Crips gangster named Killa Bee. Thinking McGavin was responsible, the gang puts a hit out on him.

The 21st Street Gang, led by Frog, attempts to negotiate a peace treaty. To protect McGavin, Hodges unwittingly exposes Frog as his source of information about the Crips' plan to kill McGavin. The Crips stage a drive-by attack on the 21st Street Gang in retaliation for giving information to the police. When the police respond to the scene, McGavin encounters Louisa dressing after having sex with a 21st Street gang member. The 21st Street Gang retaliates by assaulting the Crips hideout and killing everyone in it. One of their own is lost in the firefight. CRASH moves in on the 21st Street Gang, and Hodges is fatally shot by a 21st Street Gang member nicknamed “Bird” while arresting Frog. CRASH shoots and kills Bird in retaliation. Meanwhile, Hodges falls into delirium, and McGavin rushes to try to comfort him and breaks down in regret, as Hodges finally dies from his wound.

Sometime later, a more reserved McGavin receives a rookie partner, a black cop who grew up in their patrol area. McGavin describes his new attitude toward policing, including the two-bulls joke that he learned from Hodges earlier in the film, but his new partner reciprocates in the same way McGavin had. The film ends with McGavin reflecting on the cycle of violence as the pair drive on, continuing their patrol.

== Cast ==
- Sean Penn as Police Officer Danny "Pac-Man" McGavin, Los Angeles Police Department
- Robert Duvall as Police Officer Bob Hodges, Los Angeles Police Department
- María Conchita Alonso as Louisa Gomez
- Randy Brooks as Ron Delaney
- Don Cheadle as "Rocket"
- Glenn Plummer as Clarence "High Top" Brown
- Trinidad Silva as Leo "Frog" Lopez
- Grand L. Bush as Larry "Looney Tunes" Sylvester
- Damon Wayans as "T-Bone"
- Leon Robinson as "Killer Bee"
- Ara Thorpe as Sharon Robbins
- Romeo De Lan as Felipe Lopez
- Gerardo Mejía as "Bird"
- Tony Todd as Vietnam Vet
- Charles Walker as Reed
- Courtney Gains as "Whitey"
- T. Rodgers as "Dr. Feelgood"
- Mario Lopez as a 21st Street Gang Member
- Karla Montana as Locita
- Brian Davis as Robert "R.C." Craig
- Sy Richardson as O.S.S. Sergeant Bailey Los Angeles County Sheriff's Department
- Sherman Augustus as Police Officer Porter, Los Angeles Police Department
- Rudy Ramos as Lieutenant Melindez, Los Angeles Police Department
- Lawrence Cook as Police Officer Young, Los Angeles Police Department
- R. D. Call as Police Officer Rusty Baines, Los Angeles Police Department
- Clark Johnson as C.R.A.S.H. Police Officer Lee, Los Angeles Police Department
- Jack Nance as Police Officer Samuels, Los Angeles Police Department
- David Raynr as J.C.

== Production ==
The movie was filmed entirely in Los Angeles in 1987. The original script by Richard Di Lello took place in Chicago and was more about drug dealing than gang members. Dennis Hopper ordered changes, so Michael Schiffer was hired and the setting was changed to Los Angeles and the focus of the story became more about the world of gang members.

The joke that Hodges tells McGavin regarding the two bulls was lifted from the Pat Conroy novel The Great Santini (which was made into a movie that also starred Duvall) and explains how the character Lt. Col. "Bull" Meechum got his nickname.

Real gang members were hired as "on-location security" as well as actors/extras by producer Robert H. Solo. Two of them were shot during filming. Well-known gang leader and community activist T. Rodgers was cast as Dr. Feelgood.

On April 2, 1987, Sean Penn was arrested for punching an extra on the set of this film who was taking photos of him without permission. Penn was sentenced to 33 days in jail for this assault.

== Soundtrack ==
A soundtrack containing mainly hip hop music was released on April 15, 1988, by Warner Bros. Records. It peaked at 31 on the Billboard 200 and was certified gold on July 12, 1988.

The theme song, "Colors", was written and performed by American rapper Ice-T, and issued as the title track for the soundtrack to the film.

== Release ==
=== Box office ===
Colors grossed over $46 million in the United States and Canada.

=== Critical reception ===
Colors received both praise and criticism. The film has a 76% rating on Rotten Tomatoes based on 41 reviews, with the consensus; "Colors takes a hard-hitting yet nuanced look at urban gang violence, further elevated by strong performances from a pair of well-matched leads." Metacritic, which uses a weighted average, assigned the film a score of 66 out of 100, based on 15 critics, indicating "generally favorable" reviews. Audiences polled by CinemaScore gave the film an average grade of "B−" on an A+ to F scale.

Janet Maslin of The New York Times stated that it "has a superb eye for the poisonous flowering of gang culture amid ghetto life, and an ear to match; along with brilliant cinematography by Haskell Wexler, it's also got a fierce, rollicking sense of motion." Roger Ebert gave the film 3 out of 4 stars, hailing it as "a special movie – not just a police thriller, but a movie that has researched gangs and given some thought to what it wants to say about them."

The Washington Post's critics, Desson Howe and Hal Hinson were split, with Howe stating that Hopper "covers the mayhem with unadorned, documentary immediacy that transcends otherwise formulaic cop-fare" and Hinson stating that it "must be the least incendiary film about gang life ever made."

One of the more negative reviews of the film appeared on the BBC's Ceefax service, on which critic Louise Hart remarked: "The main weakness of the film is that it concentrates far less on the street gangs than on the growing relationship between the two cops."

The film provoked controversy from several groups. The NAACP accused the film of promoting racist stereotypes, and asked for the film's release to be delayed. Figures such as Wanda Coleman made similar accusations, with Coleman criticizing the film for not mentioning white flight or systemic racism in relation to the gang violence depicted in the film's plot. The Guardian Angels, a civilian crime-fighting group, protested the film outside of Penn's estate, with West Coast director Scott McKeown saying the film would "act as a recruitment vehicle for real gangs by glorifying them". The Los Angeles County Sheriff’s Department also protested the film's release, with several individuals arrested at theaters showing the film due to misdemeanor charges of disturbing the peace and alcohol violations, and police monitoring theaters. Three Southland theaters canceled their exhibition contracts for the film, and similar protests along with police monitoring took place in Chicago, Detroit and Miami. United Press International compared the controversy to the controversies of films such as The Public Enemy and Rebel Without a Cause.

=== Home media ===
The film was released on video cassette by Orion Home Video on November 17, 1988 with an additional seven minutes of footage added.

== Novelization ==
A novelization based on the film, written by Joel Norst, was published in 1988.

== See also ==
- List of hood films
