= Santa Monica Boulevard =

Road in Los Angeles County, California

- Part of: SR 2 from Centinela Avenue to US 101 in Los Angeles
- Length: 14.3 mi (23.0 km)
- Location: Los Angeles County, California, United States
- Nearest metro station: Vermont/Santa Monica
- West end: Ocean Avenue in Santa Monica
- Major junctions: I-405 in Sawtelle; US 101 / SR 2 in East Hollywood
- East end: Mantanita Street / Sanborn Avenue / Sunset Boulevard at Sunset Junction in Silver Lake

Santa Monica Boulevard is a major west–east thoroughfare in Los Angeles County, California, United States. It runs from Ocean Avenue in Santa Monica near the Pacific Ocean to Sunset Boulevard at Sunset Junction in Los Angeles. It passes through Beverly Hills and West Hollywood. A portion of it is designated as State Route 2 (SR 2), while the full avenue was Historic Route 66.

== Route description ==
The western terminus of Santa Monica Boulevard is at Ocean Avenue near the Pacific Ocean. From there until Interstate 405 (I-405), Santa Monica Boulevard is a densely urban commercial street. From Centinela Avenue, Santa Monica Boulevard heads northeast through the wealthy areas of West Los Angeles, Westwood, Century City, and Beverly Hills before entering the decidedly urban West Hollywood. Santa Monica Boulevard, being a major street, is for most of its length at least four lanes wide. Most of the Westside car dealerships are located on Santa Monica Boulevard.

After Sepulveda Boulevard, Santa Monica Boulevard passes by Century City and its shopping center and intersects with Wilshire Boulevard in Beverly Hills. After intersecting with Wilshire in Beverly Hills, Santa Monica Boulevard continues northeast towards West Hollywood, spanning Beverly Boulevard and Melrose Avenue. At Holloway Drive, in the middle of West Hollywood, Santa Monica, now north of Melrose Avenue turns to run east. In West Hollywood, between Doheny Drive and Fairfax Avenue along Santa Monica Boulevard, bronze name plaques are embedded in the sidewalks as part of the West Hollywood Memorial Walk. The original southern end of SR 170 was at the intersection with Highland Avenue. Santa Monica Boulevard merges on its eastern end with Sunset Boulevard in the Sunset Junction neighborhood of Silver Lake.

The south roadway of Santa Monica Boulevard, often called Little Santa Monica Boulevard in Beverly Hills, runs parallel to the state highway (north) roadway of Santa Monica Boulevard from the city's west limit to Rexford Drive. After Rexford Drive, Little Santa Monica turns east, becoming Burton Way. Burton Way merges into San Vicente Boulevard at its intersection with La Cienega Boulevard. The south roadway of Santa Monica Boulevard in Beverly Hills is a city street while the north roadway of Santa Monica Boulevard is a California state highway, each roadway handling bi-directional traffic.

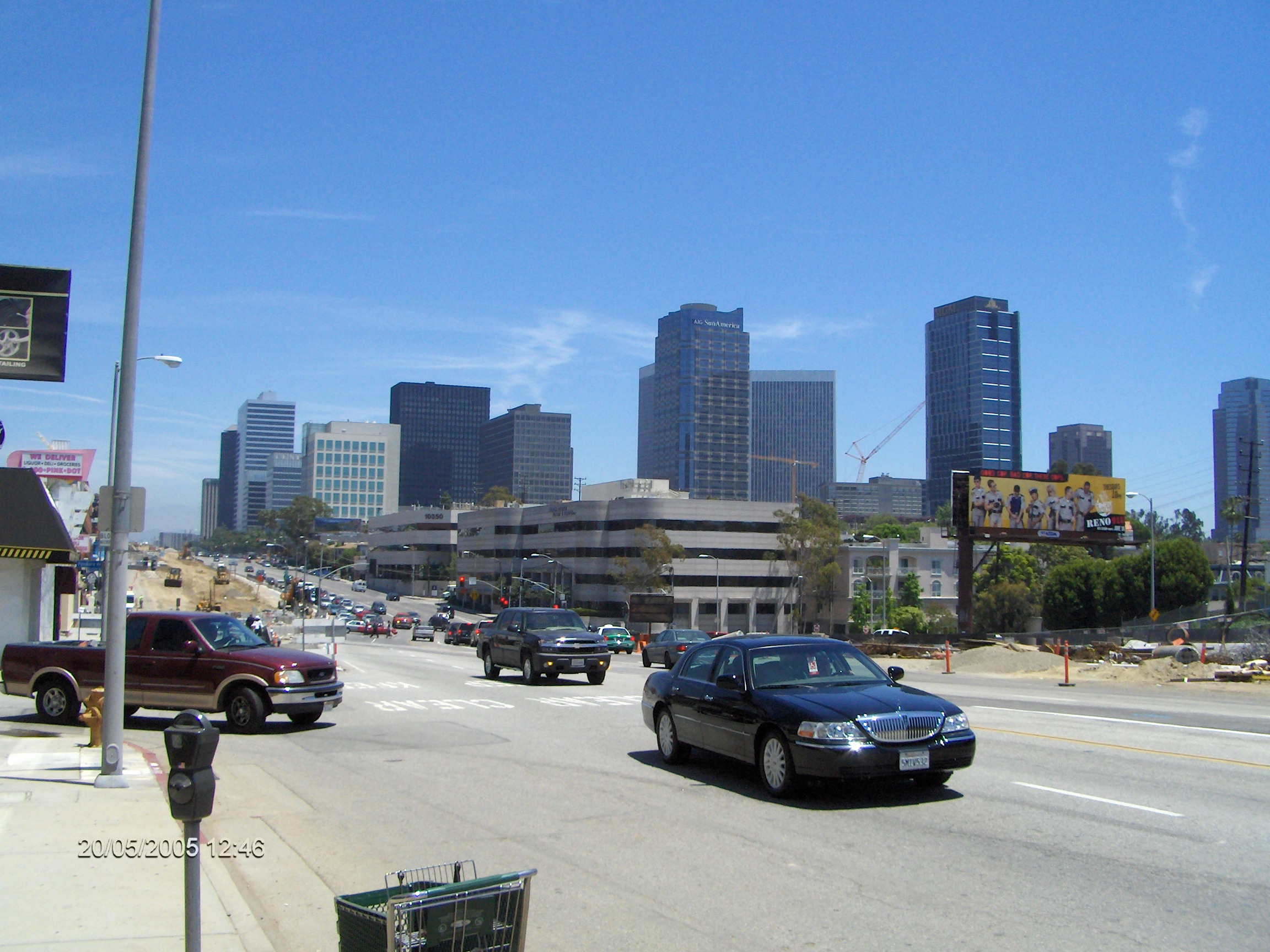
Santa Monica Boulevard in Century City

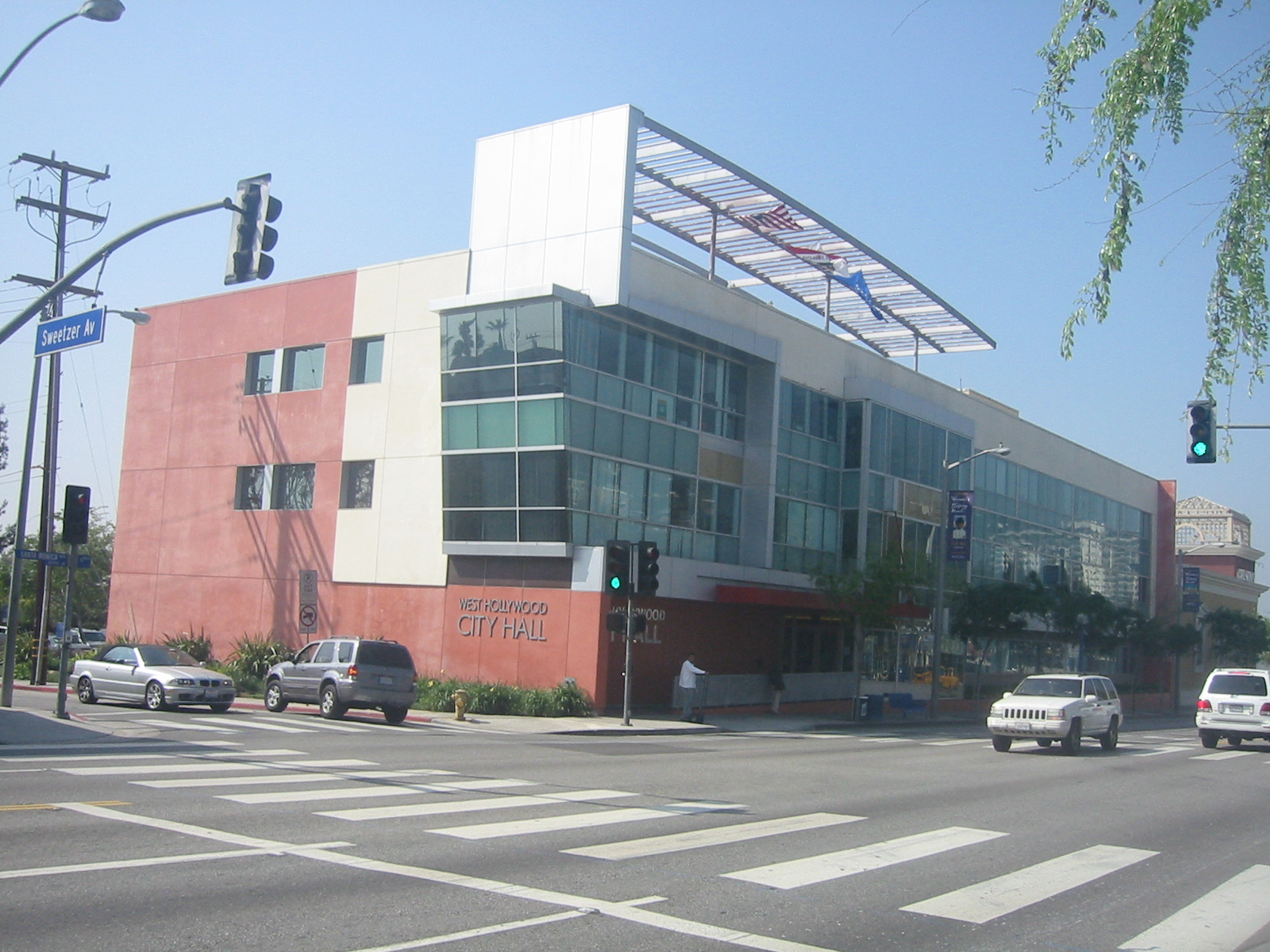
West Hollywood City Hall at 8300 Santa Monica Boulevard in West Hollywood

== 2020 protests ==
On May 31, 2020, local protests following the murder of George Floyd turned into riots which saw numerous buildings vandalized, looted and burned along Santa Monica Boulevard, with the most visible destruction being at the site of the popular Japanese-themed restaurant Sake House. Wexler's Deli co-owner Mike Kassar stated to Eater that "Basically every food and beverage establishment for ten blocks got trashed".

== Transport ==
Metro Local line 4 and Santa Monica Transit Line 1 serve Santa Monica Boulevard, with the latter serving the boulevard in West Los Angeles and Santa Monica. A portion of West Hollywood-operated The PickUp operates on Santa Monica Boulevard in West Hollywood. The Metro B Line serves an underground station on Santa Monica Boulevard at its intersection with Vermont Avenue.

The Pacific Electric operated Red Car interurban trains and streetcars over Santa Monica Boulevard until 1953. The street hosted the company's South Hollywood–Sherman Line and Sawtelle Line as well as the Owensmouth Line and San Fernando Line which served the San Fernando Valley.

== Major intersections ==
Location	mi	km	Destinations	Notes
Santa Monica	0.0	0.0	Ocean Avenue	Western terminus of Santa Monica Boulevard
Santa Monica	0.5	0.80	Historic US 66 west (Lincoln Boulevard)	Western end of Historic US 66 concurrency; connects to I-10 and SR 1; former SR 2 west
Santa Monica–Los Angeles line	2.4	3.9	Western terminus of SR 2 Centinela Avenue	Western end of SR 2 concurrency
See SR 2 (LA 2.31–12.74)
Los Angeles	12.7– 12.8	20.4– 20.6	Western Avenue to US 101 north (Hollywood Freeway) – Ventura US 101 south / SR 2 east (Hollywood Freeway) – Los Angeles	Eastern end of SR 2 concurrency; US 101 exit 7
Los Angeles	13.7	22.0	Vermont Avenue	
Los Angeles	14.2– 14.4	22.9– 23.2	Mantanita Street / Sanborn Avenue / Sunset Boulevard (Historic US 66 east)	Sunset Junction; eastern terminus of Santa Monica Boulevard; eastern end of Historic US 66 concurrency
1.000 mi = 1.609 km; 1.000 km = 0.621 mi: Concurrency terminus
