= Original Tommy's =

Hamburger restaurant chain in Southern California

Coordinates: 34.069545°N 118.276368°W

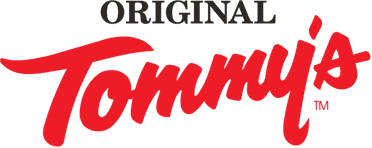
- Type: Private
- Industry: Restaurants
- Genre: Fast food
- Founded: 1946; 80 years ago in Los Angeles, California, United States
- Founder: Thomas James "Tommy" Koulax
- Headquarters: Monrovia, California
- Number of locations: 32 (29 California, 3 Nevada) (Note: Number of locations was 33 in 2019. The San Diego location closed in 2023.) (2021)
- Area served: California, Nevada
- Key people: Dawna Bernal (President)
- Products: hamburgers, hot dogs, tamales, chili, french fries, soft drinks
- Revenue: ▲US$62 million (2021)
- Number of employees: 5,000 (2021)
- Website: originaltommys.com

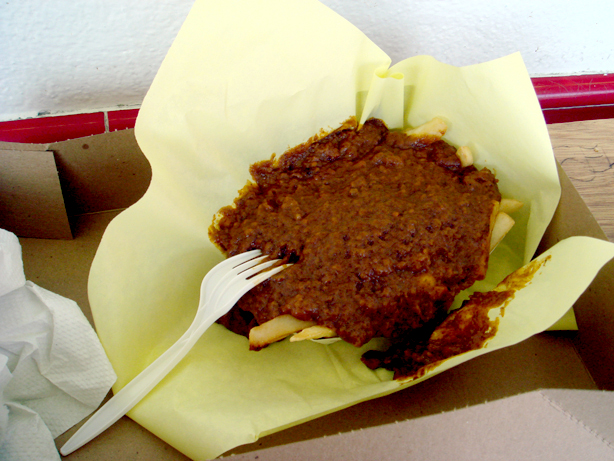
Chili Cheese Fries, served at the original location (cheese is under the chili)

Original Tommy's, previously known as Original Tommy's World Famous Hamburgers, is a fast food hamburger restaurant chain in the Los Angeles metropolitan area. It is known for its hamburgers and chili burgers.

== History ==
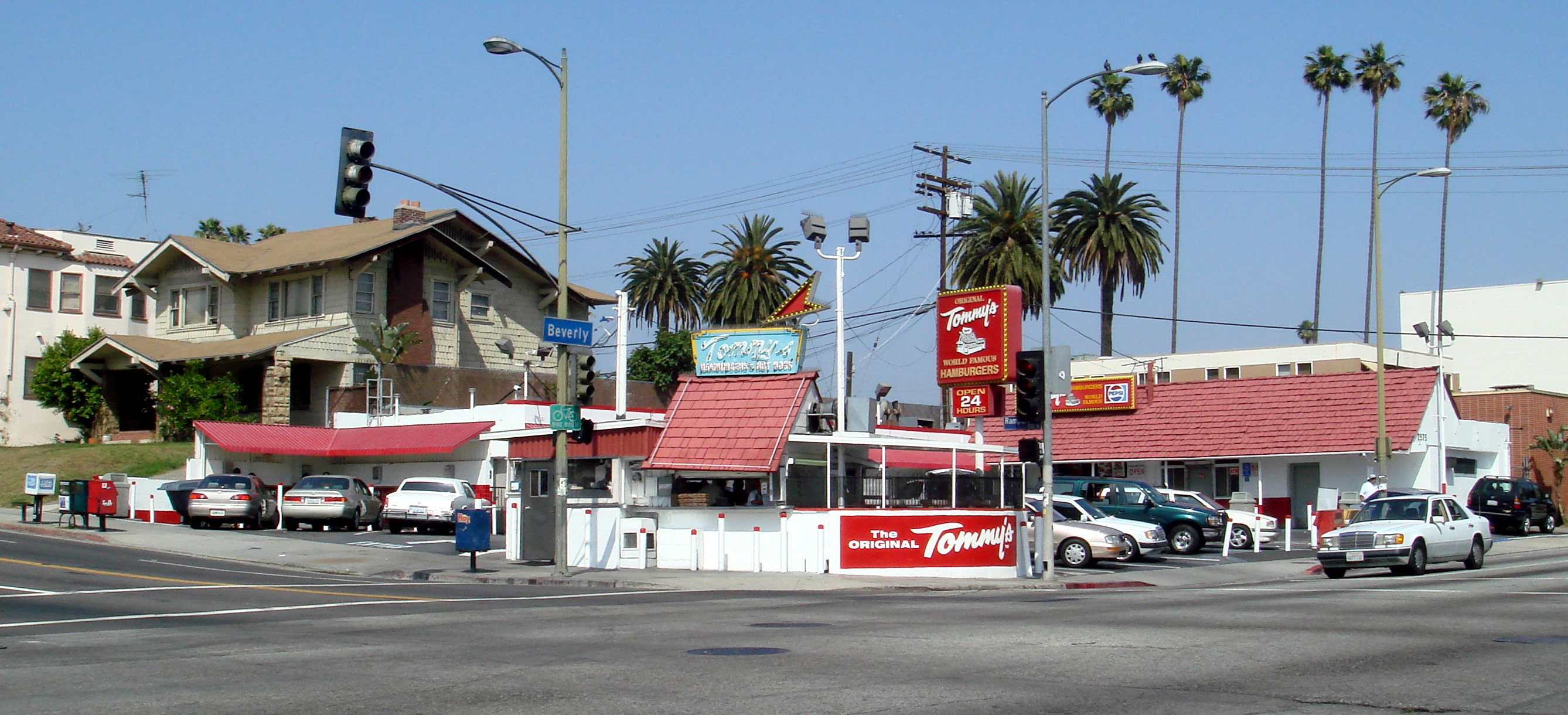
Location of the first restaurant at the intersection of Beverly Blvd & Rampart Blvd in Los Angeles. The restaurant comprises both the shack in the foreground as well as the building that surrounds it. Patrons can eat at their cars or standing at the counter along the back walls.

Older logo

The original location was opened on May 15, 1946, by Tom Koulax (October 26, 1918 – May 28, 1992), the son of Greek immigrants, on the northeast corner of Beverly and Rampart boulevards west of downtown Los Angeles. The stand, which still exists today, sold hamburgers and hot dogs topped with chili. Initially, the business was slow but it soon started to pick up. During the 1960s, the entire lot at the intersection was purchased. Soon after, the northwest corner was acquired for expanded parking and storage of goods. Not long after that, a second service counter occupying the building at the perimeter of the northeast lot was set up.

Tommy's began to expand in the 1970s, and grew to 30 locations by 2006. Most Original Tommy's restaurants are found in the Greater Los Angeles Area. In recent years several locations have closed. The Santa Monica location was closed on April 20, 2014, when the landlord refused to renew the lease and leased the location to Starbucks instead. Original Tommy's last San Diego location closed in 2023.

In 2008, the company expanded for the first time outside of California by opening two locations in Clark County, Nevada. A third Nevada location was opened in 2013.

As of May 2026, there are 32 locations. The company is based in Monrovia, California, after years of being in Glendale, California, and is run by the late Tom Koulax's family.

The restaurant's success in the Los Angeles market has attracted many imitators. A 2019 study by the Los Angeles Times listed 67 restaurants, more than double the number of Original Tommy's restaurants, in the Los Angeles region with some form of the name "Thomas" in the name along with similarity in the signage and menu. Bob Auerbach, a stepson of the restaurant's founder, Tom Koulax, said that the family made a conscious decision not to doggedly pursue legal action against the imitators. The chain's full name, Original Tommy’s World Famous Hamburgers, is trademarked, and they have sued to protect the "original" and "world famous" parts of their name.

== See also ==
- List of hamburger restaurants
