= Olympic Park Neighborhood Council =

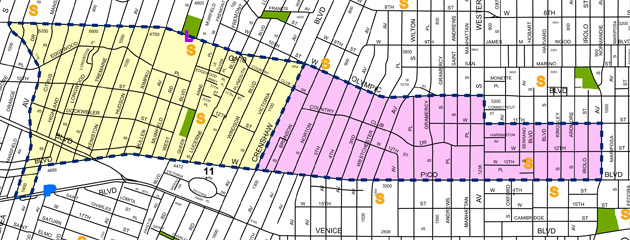
The OPNC runs from La Brea Avenue to Normandie Avenue (East/West) and Olympic Boulevard to Pico Boulevard (North/South)

The Olympic Park Neighborhood Council (OPNC) represents 22,000 constituents in the Olympic Park neighborhood of Los Angeles. It runs from the east side of La Brea Avenue to the west side of Normandie Avenue, and from the south side of Olympic Boulevard to the north side of Pico Boulevard. In 2012, the OPNC was involved in the median redevelopment project on San Vicente Boulevard, from Fairfax Avenue to Pico Boulevard. As of July 2025, the OPNC had 9 West At-Large Representatives, 9 East At-Large Representatives, and 1 Youth Representative. The board has a $25,000 annual budget, down from $32,000 in 2024 and down from $42,000 in 2020.

The board as of July 2025 is as follows:

Ramsay Goyal, President

Sue McCullogh, Vice President

Sally Boldt, Secretary

West At Large Representatives: Sally Boldt, Carlo De La Cruz, Mateo Frey, Joshua Gordon, Elle Johnson, Kate Kunzman Chan, Sue McCullough, Beverly Rowe

East At Large Representatives: Jessica Celious, Mitchell Edelson, Ramsay Goyal, Karen Hadley, Sheila Hill, Judy Reidel, Clem Wright

Student Representative: Samuel Bark
