= San Vicente Boulevard =

Street in Western Los Angeles running southeast of Beverly Hills, United States

Coordinates: 34°3′54″N 118°22′19″W

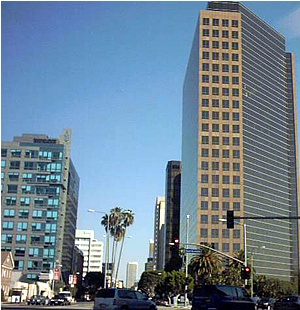
Intersection of Wilshire and San Vicente Boulevards, at the western end of the Miracle Mile neighborhood of Los Angeles, California.

San Vicente Boulevard is a major northwest-southeast thoroughfare located in the western portion of the metropolitan area of Los Angeles, California.

The boulevard begins at Venice Boulevard between Crenshaw Boulevard and La Brea Avenue and travels in a northwesterly direction towards Beverly Hills. The roadway splits into two streets past La Cienega Boulevard: the western branch becoming Burton Way, which eventually becomes South Santa Monica Boulevard and connects directly to downtown Beverly Hills. The northern branch remains as San Vicente Boulevard itself, passes Beverly Center, continues north into West Hollywood and becomes North Clark Street at Sunset Boulevard. A separate stretch of road with the same name runs from Santa Monica to Brentwood.

== Route and addressing ==
San Vicente curves diagonally and intersects both east-west and north-south streets, allowing direct access between Downtown Los Angeles and Beverly Hills or West Hollywood. Locating an address on San Vicente Boulevard can be difficult as the road does not follow Los Angeles numbering conventions.

The easternmost end at Venice Boulevard begins with address number 4600 and increases to the west. The address numbers continue to increase up to 6600 at Wilshire Boulevard. Here, the numbering switches from east-west numbers to north-south numbers with respect to the city grid.

Between Wilshire Boulevard and La Cienega Boulevard, the median of San Vicente forms a border between Beverly Hills and Los Angeles. The east side of the roadway is known as S. San Vicente Boulevard, with address numbers (even) decreasing from 700 at Wilshire to 400 at La Cienega. The west side is known as N. San Vicente Boulevard, with address numbers (odd) increasing from 100 at Wilshire to 300 at La Cienega.

North of La Cienega, both sides of the street are in Los Angeles. The numbering continues accordingly as 400 S. San Vicente Boulevard. The street becomes N. San Vicente Boulevard at Gracie Allen Drive. As in the rest of Los Angeles, the numbers at the city's grid axis start with 100 (numbers 0-99 are not used). At Beverly Boulevard (300 N.), San Vicente enters the city of West Hollywood, where the street name and numbering do not change. The street terminates at Sunset Boulevard in West Hollywood at 1100 N. San Vicente.

A second San Vicente Boulevard runs between the Brentwood neighborhood of Los Angeles and Santa Monica. This street is unrelated except in name.

== San Vicente Park ==
Local neighborhood councils and non profit green activist have been pursuing making San Vicente Boulevard's median green space more accessible. Citing lack of civic green space. Planning meetings have taken place in the affected Olympic Park Neighborhood Council, Pico Neighborhood Council, and the Mid-City West Community Council. Money for the project is coming from these three councils and the Community Redevelopment Agency of Los Angeles (CRA/LA). The Olympic Park Neighborhood Council is committing $30,000 for the project. In 2011, construction was to begin on the San Vicente median between Pico Boulevard and Fairfax Avenue sections center median. "The plan called for the medians between Fairfax Avenue and Pico Boulevard to be adorned with new trees, a walking path and seating areas. Trees and plaques at the intersections at Pico Boulevard and Fairfax Avenue, identifying them as gateways, will also be installed." Recently, neighborhood councils and activist have pushed for the closure of all lanes and expanding the park along most of the planned K Line Northern Extension route from Pico Boulevard to the Beverly Center, A 3.2 miles linear park. Leaving only a locals utility lane for residents but a wider linear park for the city.
