= Chili burger =

Hamburger, with the patty topped with chili con carne

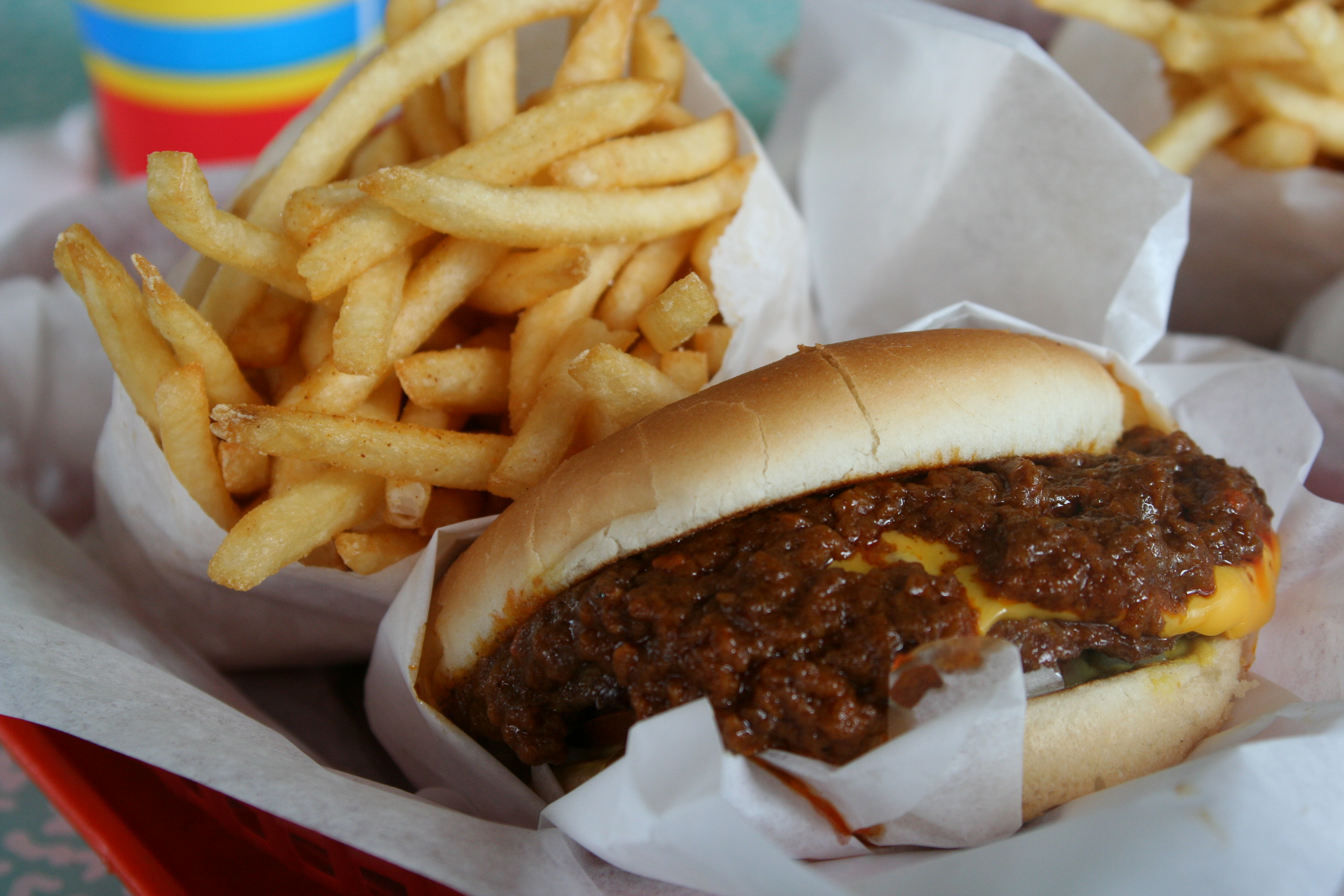
- Chili burger with fries
- Alternative names: Chili size, size
- Type: Sandwich
- Place of origin: United States
- Region or state: originally Los Angeles
- Created by: Likely Thomas "Ptomaine Tommy" DeForest, 1920s
- Main ingredients: Hamburger patty, chili con carne
- Variations: Carolina burger

A chili burger (also known as a chili size, or simply size, stemming from "hamburger size") is a type of hamburger. It consists of a hamburger, with the patty topped with chili con carne. It is often served open-faced, and sometimes the chili is served alongside the burger rather than on top. The chili may be served alone, or with cheese, onions, or occasionally tomatoes as garnishes.

== History ==
Chili burgers appear to have been invented in the 1920s by Thomas M. "Ptomaine Tommy" DeForest, who founded a sawdust-floored all-night restaurant, "Ptomaine Tommy's", located in the Lincoln Heights neighborhood of Los Angeles. Ptomaine Tommy's was open from around 1919 to 1958, where his chili burger was referred to as "size", and chopped onions as "flowers" or "violets".

The term size for a chili burger arguably derives from the portion size of the chili used at Ptomaine Tommy's. Ptomaine Tommy "had two ladles, a large and a small" with which to serve his chili, whether smothered on top of the burger or in a bowl; originally the ordering lingo used by his patrons was "hamburger size" vs. "steak size", but later simplified to "size" and "oversize". The use of the shorthand term "size" for burger-size portion of chili (in a bowl or on a burger) then gained currency throughout Los Angeles. Ptomaine Tommy was forced to close his restaurant August 10, 1958 and sell his property to satisfy creditors, and he died just a week later. His service to the community and his invention was noted by resolution of the California State Senate that same year.

Food author John T. Edge considers the invention the milestone that marks the start of "traceable history of burgers in LA", a first step to what he considers the "baroque" character of the Los Angeles hamburger scene. By interviewing former customers and friends decades after the fact, columnist Jack Smith wrote a definitive article in 1974 about DeForest and the dish that he had invented which became a very important part of the history of Los Angeles. What helped spread the popularity of this dish was Deforest's diverse clientele which included doctors coming off the late shift at the local county hospital, fight fans on their way home after attending matches at the Olympic Auditorium, and people associated with the Hollywood film industry.

Several US food chains specialize in chili burgers. One of these is Original Tommy's, which dates to 1946. The chili burger is also a notable staple of Southwestern Pennsylvania, with the Brighton Hot Dog Shoppe offering both chili burgers and chili dogs.

== Variations ==
=== Carolina Burger ===
The Carolina Burger is a regional variant of the chili burger served with coleslaw, mustard and chopped onions. Common in local restaurants in the Carolinas, it is also periodically offered at Wendy's restaurants as the Carolina Classic.

== See also ==
- Chili dog
- Fat Boy (hamburger)
- List of hamburgers
- Sloppy joe
