= La Cienega Boulevard =

Highway in Los Angeles, US

La Cienega Boulevard (Spanish: "The Swamp")
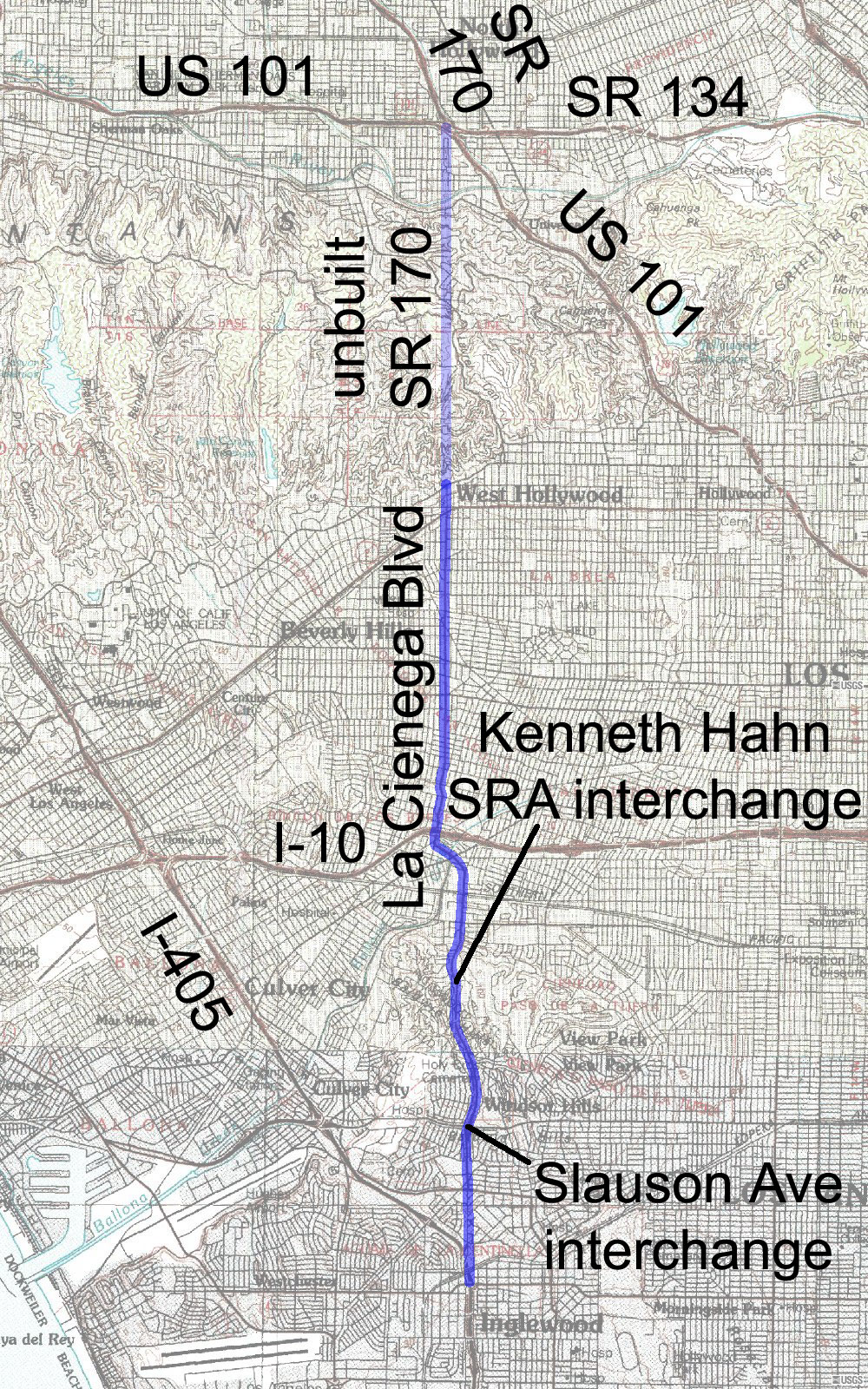
- Interactive map of La Cienega Boulevard (Spanish: "The Swamp")
- Nearest metro station: : Wilshire/La Cienega; La Cienega/Jefferson
- South end: El Segundo Boulevard in Del Aire
- Major junctions: I-105 in Los Angeles; I-405 in Inglewood; I-10 in Los Angeles
- North end: Sunset Boulevard in West Hollywood

La Cienega Boulevard is a major north–south arterial road in the Los Angeles metropolitan area that runs from the Sunset Strip in West Hollywood in the north to El Segundo Boulevard in Hawthorne in the south. It was named for Rancho Las Ciénegas, literally "The Ranch Of The Swamps", an area of marshland south of Rancho La Brea.

Landmarks along La Cienega Boulevard include Kenneth Hahn State Recreation Area, Restaurant Row, the Beverly Center mall and other shops in the La Cienega Design Quarter, and its intersection with Beverly Boulevard that is traditionally considered the epicenter of the studio zone.

== Route description ==
La Cienega Boulevard's northern terminus is the Sunset Strip in West Hollywood. It runs as a surface street in a due south direction through Beverly Hills and a section known as "Restaurant Row" for its historic tradition of upscale restaurants. South of Olympic, La Cienega runs through between the Pico-Robertson, South Carthay, and Crestview neighborhoods of West Los Angeles. South of the Santa Monica Freeway, the I-10, it briefly borders Culver City, and passes the La Cienega/Jefferson station of the Metro E Line.

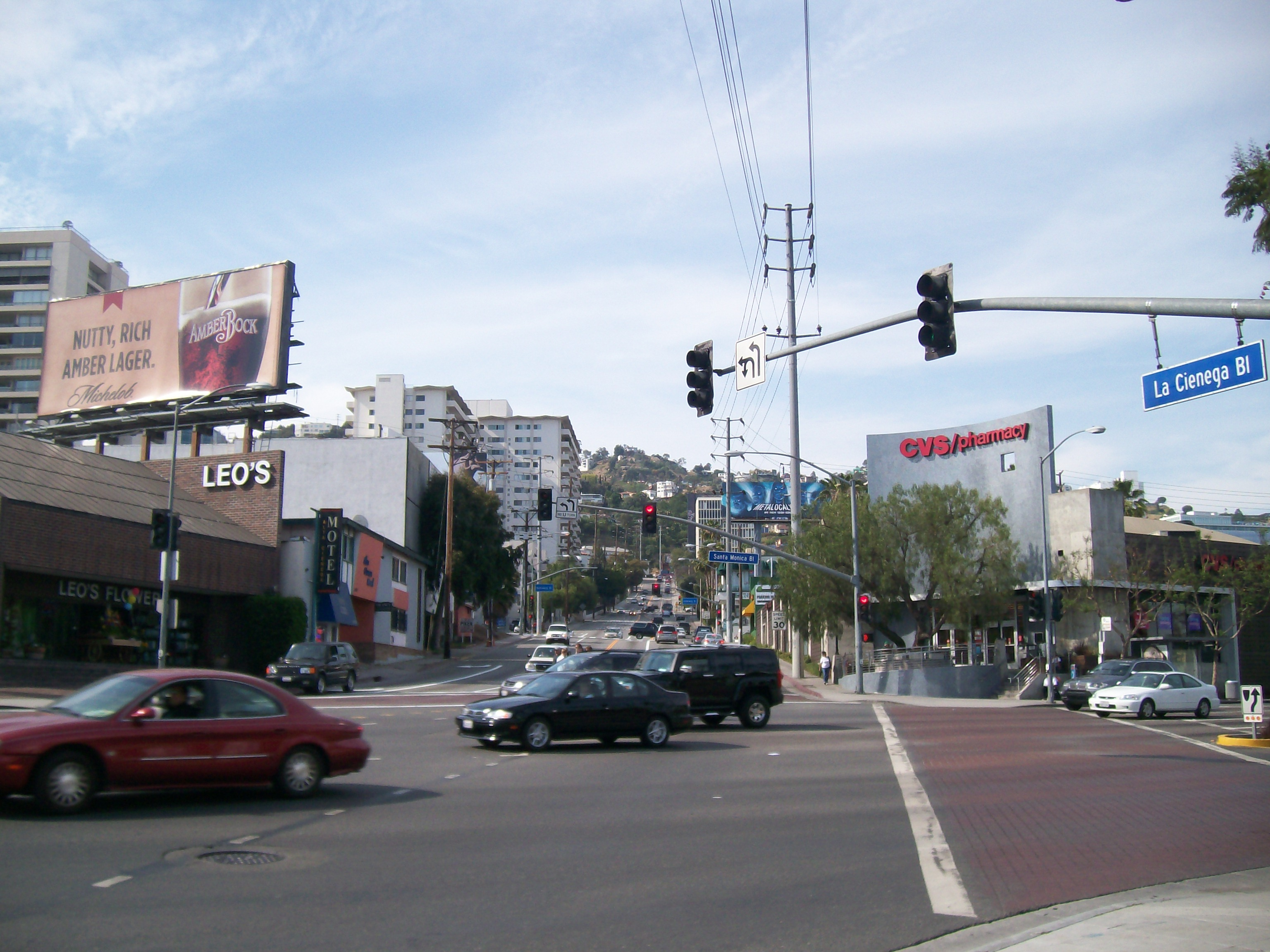
Looking north on La Cienega from Santa Monica Blvd

Between Obama Boulevard and Centinela Avenue, most of La Cienega Boulevard is a divided, limited access expressway with few traffic signals. In the late 1940s, as part of the proposed Laurel Canyon Freeway, La Cienega was constructed to freeway standards with several grade-separated interchanges. Emergency call boxes like those found along the area's freeways were also installed along that stretch in the early 1970s. The Laurel Canyon Freeway was never completed. This stretch of La Cienega passes through the Kenneth Hahn State Recreation Area, Baldwin Hills, the Inglewood Oil Field, and Ladera Heights. Two pedestrian bridges, one just north of Fairview and another in the Kenneth Hahn SRA, traverse the grade-separated section of the road.

South of Centinela Avenue, La Cienega becomes a surface street once more, passing through a short section of North Inglewood before connecting to the San Diego (405) Freeway via an incomplete interchange. This section creates significant traffic problems as it features several traffic signals, street parking on the southbound side, and apartment garages which open directly onto the northbound side, while being directly connected to the freeway to the south and the freeway-like section of La Cienega to the north. Plans have been proposed repeatedly over the years to grade-separate the intersections with Centinela Avenue and La Tijera Boulevard, but none have moved forward.

It terminates at El Segundo Boulevard in Hawthorne along the west side of the freeway. A non-contiguous segment also named La Cienega Boulevard runs along the east side of the 405 freeway, roughly between El Segundo Boulevard and Rosecrans Avenue in an unincorporated strip of Los Angeles County.

=== La Cienega Design Quarter ===
The area of La Cienega Boulevard, from Beverly Boulevard to Santa Monica Boulevard, and its satellite streets is known as the La Cienega Design Quarter. Its shops and galleries house many antiques, furniture, rugs, accessories and art. Art dealer Felix Landau operated his trend-setting gallery there in the 1960s. It is also the location of the Beverly Center shopping mall.

The southeast corner of Beverly and La Cienega Boulevards is considered the center of the studio zone, the 30-mile (48 km) radius used by the American entertainment industry to determine employee benefits for work performed inside and outside of it. It became the center of the zone in 1970 when it was the then-headquarters of the Association of Motion Picture and Television Producers (AMPTP).

=== Restaurant Row ===
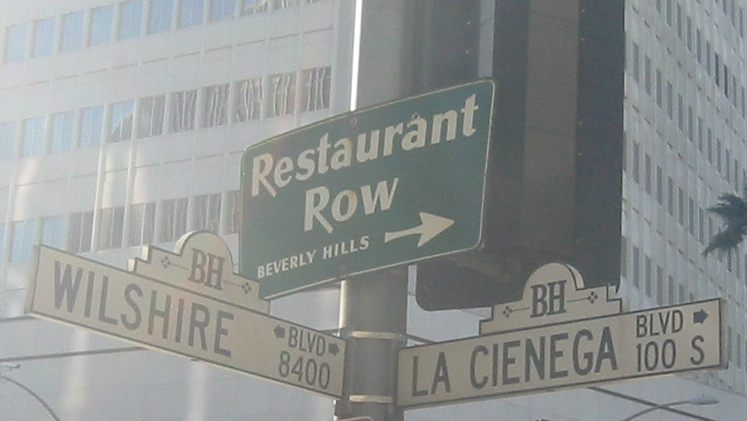
Sign at the corner of Wilshire and La Cienega

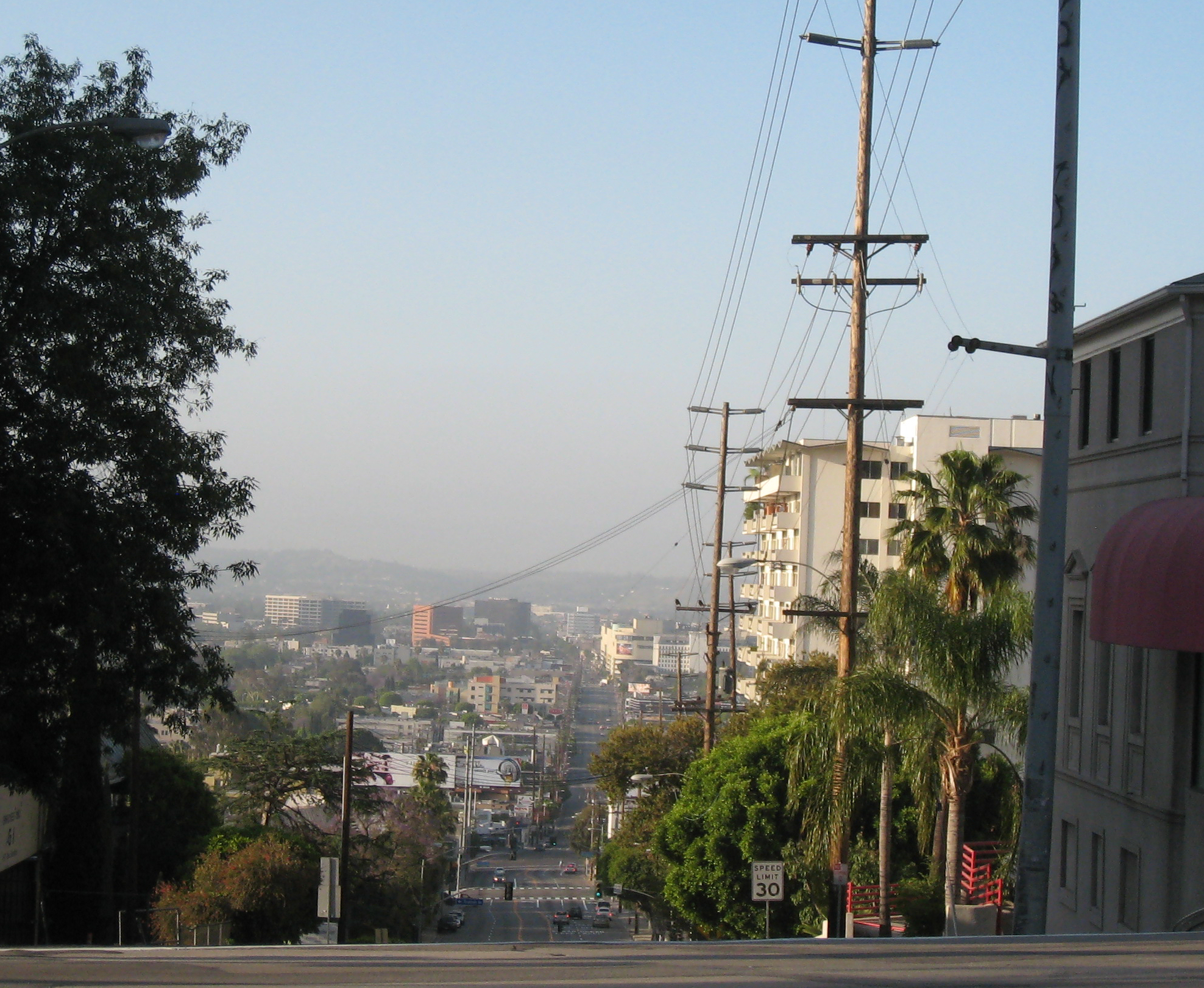
Looking south down La Cienega from the intersection with Sunset Blvd

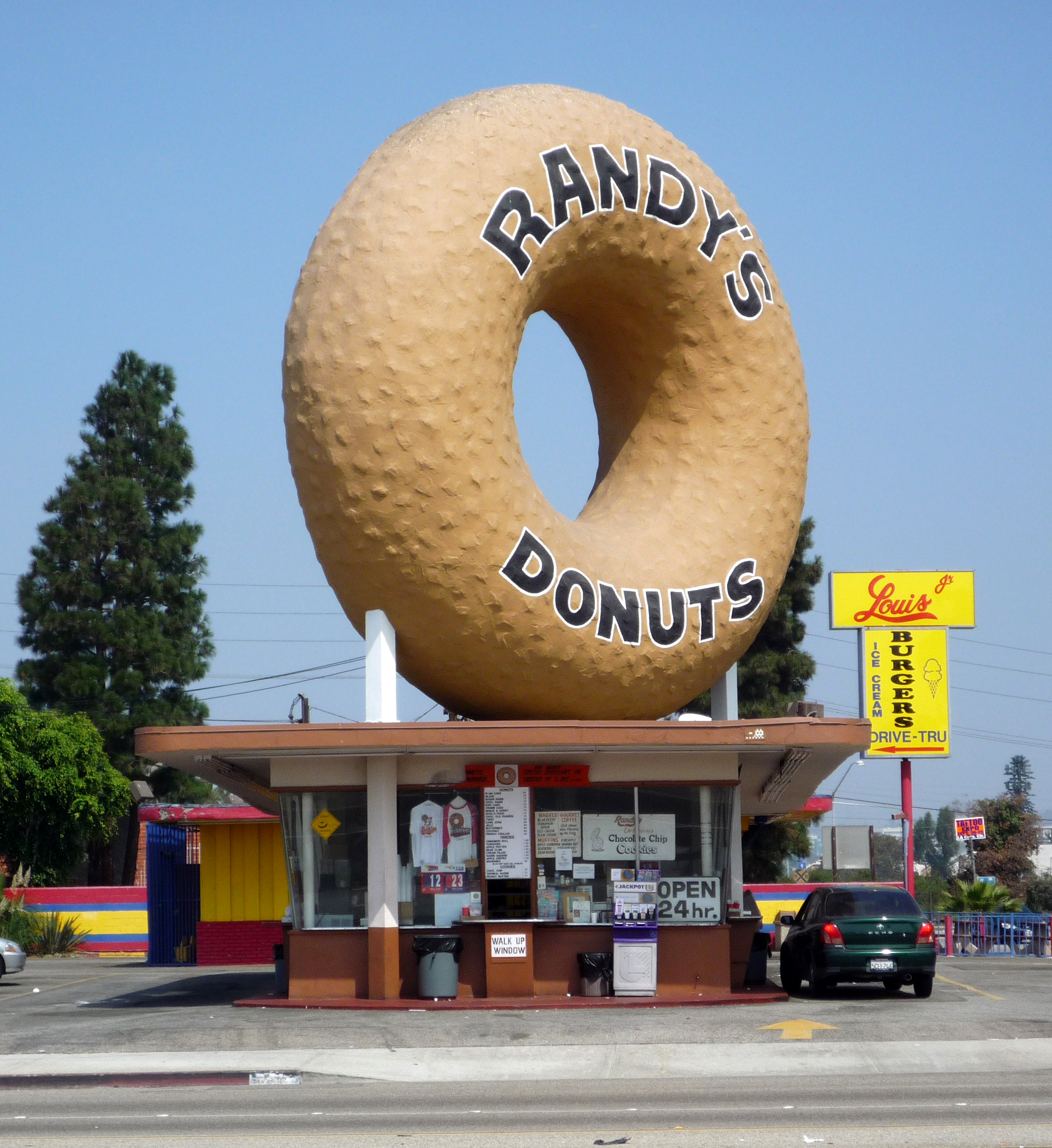
The big Randy's Donuts shop is at the corner of La Cienega and Manchester Blvd in Inglewood

La Cienega in Beverly Hills, north of Wilshire Boulevard, is known as Restaurant Row because it features many upscale restaurants. From Wilshire in Beverly Hills traveling north, the best-known establishments include the original Lawry's the Prime Rib, The Stinking Rose, Darioush, Hakobe, Tokyo Table - Tokyo City Cuisine, Matsuhisa, Fogo de Chão, Gyu-Kaku, Woo Lae Oak, The Bazaar by José Andrés, and Morton's.

== Etymology ==
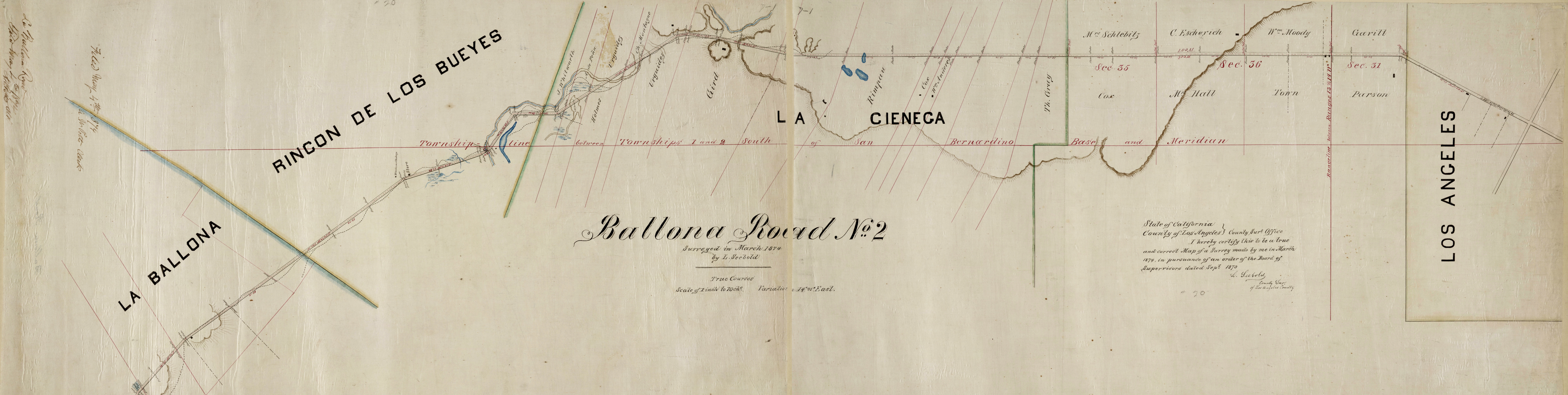
Ballona Road, now Washington Blvd., passes through the marshland, creeks and ponds of La Cienega in 1874

La Cienega Boulevard is named after Rancho Las Cienegas Mexican land grant roughly in the region now called "West Los Angeles." The Spanish phrase la ciénaga translates into English as "the swamp" and the area named "Las Ciénegas" was a continual marshland due to the course of the Los Angeles River through that area prior to a massive southerly shift in 1825 to roughly its present course. The difference in spelling in Los Angeles between the Castilian Spanish word ciénaga and the name of the thoroughfare, which is common in other Iberian languages like Extremaduran, originated with the name of the ranch.

== Transportation ==
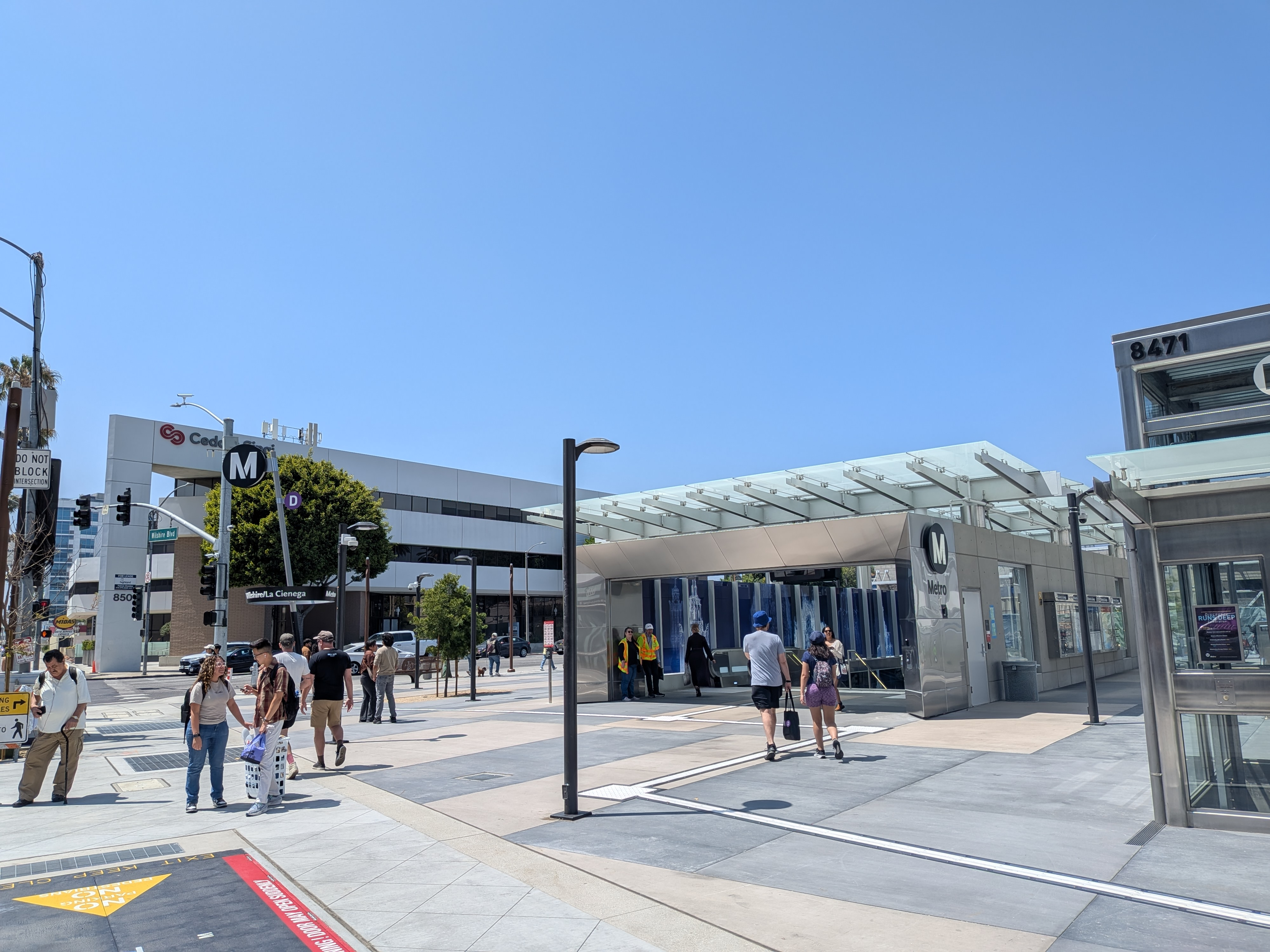
Entrance of the Wilshire/La Cienega station on Wilshire Boulevard in Beverly Hills.

Metro Local line 105 runs on La Cienega Boulevard. An elevated light rail station for the Metro E Line is located at Jefferson Boulevard. A subway station for the Metro D Line is located at Wilshire Boulevard.

== Major intersections ==
The entire route is in Los Angeles County.

Location	mi	km	Destinations	Notes
Hawthorne–Del Aire line	0	0.0	El Segundo Boulevard to I-405 (San Diego Freeway)	South end of La Cienega Boulevard; I-405 north exit 44
Del Aire	0.2	0.32	I-405 south (San Diego Freeway)	I-405 south exit 44/El Segundo Boulevard
Del Aire	0.5	0.80	120th Street	
Los Angeles–Lennox line	0.9	1.4	I-405 south (San Diego Freeway)	I-405 south exit 45B/Imperial Highway east
Los Angeles–Lennox line	1.0	1.6	Imperial Highway to I-405 north (San Diego Freeway)	I-405 north exit 45B
Los Angeles–Lennox line	1.2	1.9	I-405 south (San Diego Freeway) – Long Beach	I-405 south exit 45B/Imperial Highway west
Los Angeles–Lennox line	1.9	3.1	I-405 south (San Diego Freeway)	Next to I-405 south exit 46/Century Boulevard east
Los Angeles–Inglewood line	2.0	3.2	Century Boulevard to I-405 north (San Diego Freeway) – LAX	I-405 north exit 46
Los Angeles–Inglewood line	2.2	3.5	I-405 south (San Diego Freeway)	I-405 south exit 46/Century Boulevard west
Inglewood	2.5	4.0	Arbor Vitae Street	
Inglewood	3.0	4.8	I-405 south (San Diego Freeway) / Olive Street	I-405 south exit 47
Inglewood	3.1	5.0	Manchester Boulevard	Former SR 42
Inglewood	3.3	5.3	Florence Avenue	
Inglewood	3.5	5.6	I-405 south (San Diego Freeway) – Long Beach	Interchange; I-405 south exit 47; no access from La Cienega Boulevard northbound
Los Angeles–Inglewood line	4.3	6.9	Centinela Avenue	
Los Angeles–Inglewood line	4.3	6.9	South end of expressway	
Ladera Heights	5.0	8.0	Slauson Avenue – Ladera Heights	Interchange; former SR 90
Ladera Heights	5.0	8.0	Stocker Street	
Los Angeles–Culver City line	6.8	10.9	Kenneth Hahn State Recreation Area	Interchange
Los Angeles	7.4	11.9	South end of expressway	
Los Angeles	7.4	11.9	Obama Boulevard	
Los Angeles	7.8	12.6	Jefferson Boulevard	
Los Angeles	8.0	12.9	Fairfax Avenue to I-10 (Santa Monica Freeway)	
Culver City	8.2	13.2	Washington Boulevard	
Los Angeles	8.5	13.7	Venice Boulevard	
Los Angeles	8.6	13.8	I-10 (Santa Monica Freeway) – Santa Monica, Los Angeles	Interchange; I-10 exit 7A
Los Angeles	9.8	15.8	Pico Boulevard	
Los Angeles–Beverly Hills line	10.2	16.4	Olympic Boulevard	
Beverly Hills	10.6	17.1	Wilshire Boulevard	
Los Angeles	11.0	17.7	San Vicente Boulevard	
Los Angeles	11.1	17.9	3rd Street	
Los Angeles	11.3	18.2	Beverly Boulevard	Center of the so-called "studio zone"
West Hollywood	11.8	19.0	Melrose Avenue	
West Hollywood	12.3	19.8	Santa Monica Boulevard (SR 2)	
West Hollywood	12.6	20.3	Sunset Boulevard	North end of La Cienega Boulevard
1.000 mi = 1.609 km; 1.000 km = 0.621 mi
