= Doheny Drive =

North-south thoroughfare in Los Angeles County, California

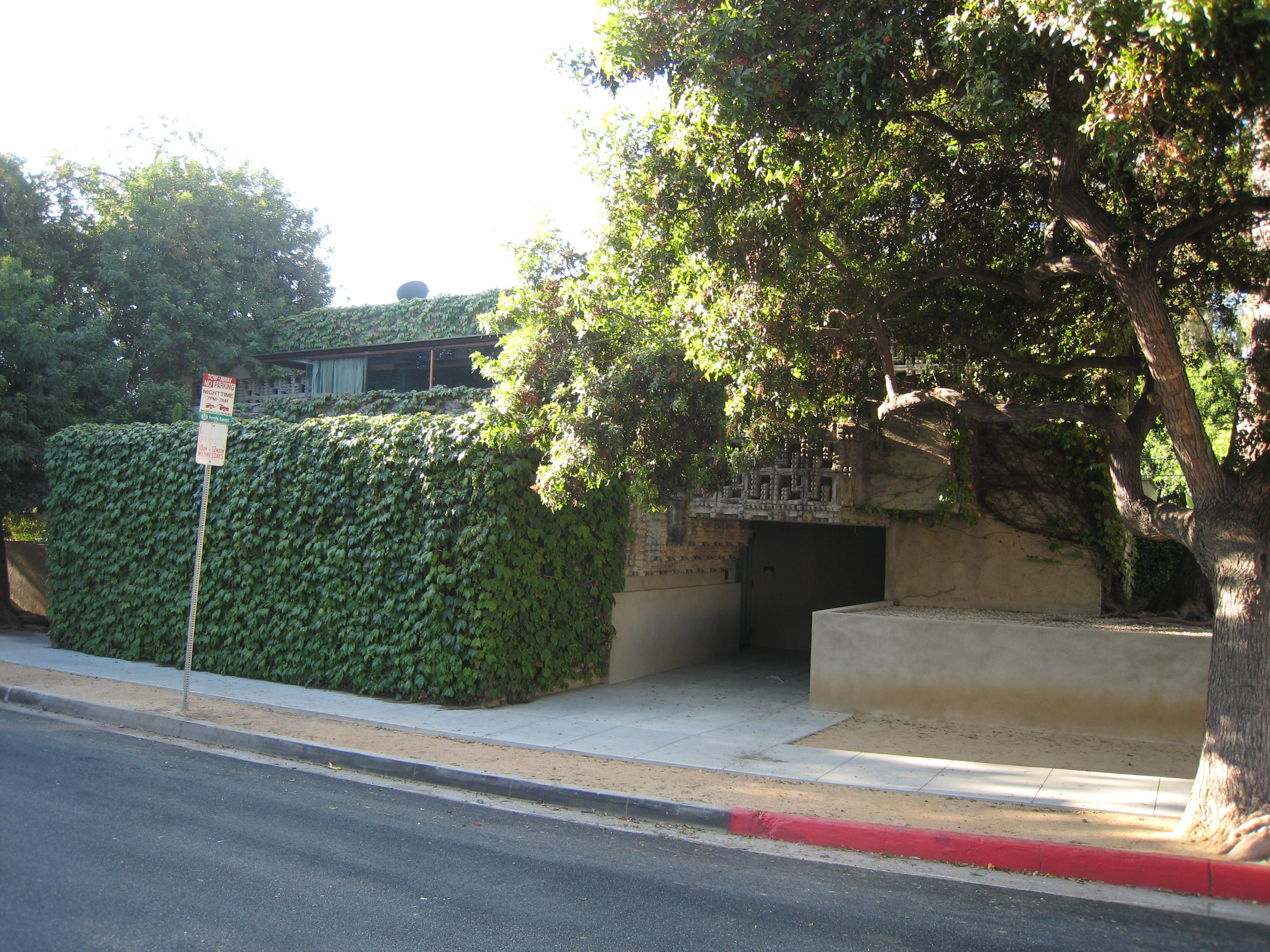
- Lloyd Wright Home and Studio on Doheny Drive
- Length: 4.2 mi (6.8 km)
- South end: Cul-de-sac at 34.0518°N 118.3903°W
- Major junctions: West Pico Blvd. West Olympic Blvd. Wilshire Blvd. Beverly Blvd. Sunset Blvd.
- North end: Cul-de-sac at 34.1063°N 118.3878°W

Doheny Drive is a north–south thoroughfare mostly through Beverly Hills and West Hollywood, in Los Angeles County, California.

It is named for Edward L. Doheny, an early 20th century oil tycoon based in Los Angeles.

== Route ==
Doheny Drive starts south of Cashio Street, in a residential cul-de-sac near the Beverlywood neighborhood of Los Angeles. After crossing Pico Boulevard and the neighborhood of Pico-Robertson, it enters Beverly Hills at Whitworth Drive and crosses Olympic Boulevard. After crossing Wilshire Boulevard, Santa Monica Boulevard, Sunset Boulevard, and other east/west arteries, Doheny Drive ends north of Swallow Drive in the Hollywood Hills West neighborhood at another residential cul-de-sac. It forms the boundary of West Hollywood and Beverly Hills between Beverly Boulevard and Phyllis Street.

Doheny Drive encounters few traffic lights, making it a relatively quick north–south trip. From Santa Monica Boulevard to Sunset Boulevard, condominiums and houses predominate. The road forms the western end of the Sunset Strip, with Laurel Canyon Boulevard−Crescent Heights Boulevard the eastern end.
