= Studio zone =

Area local to Hollywood for employment purposes

Studio zone Thirty-mile zone (TMZ)
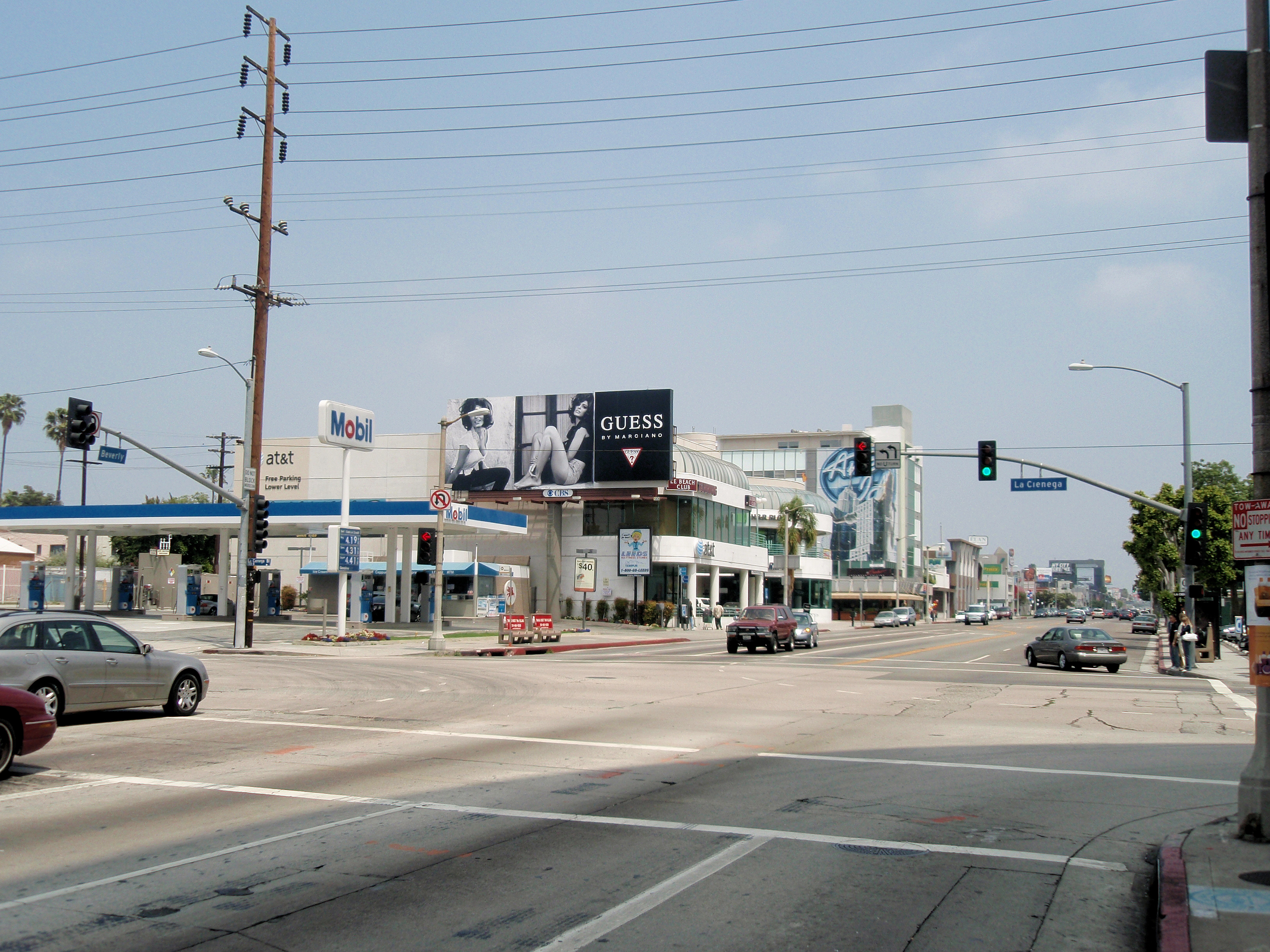
- The intersection at the center of the studio zone: Beverly Boulevard and La Cienega Boulevard in Los Angeles (2008)
- Interactive maps of the studio zone
- Coordinates: 34°04′33″N 118°22′36″W

The studio zone, also known as the thirty-mile zone (TMZ), is an area defined by a 30-mile (48 km) radius of "Hollywood" used by the American entertainment industry to determine employee benefits for work performed inside and outside of it. Its center has traditionally been regarded as the southeast corner of Beverly Boulevard and La Cienega Boulevard in Los Angeles, California. The boundaries of the 30-mile (48 km) radius includes the southern, urbanized half of Los Angeles County, as well as parts of eastern Ventura County and northwestern Orange County.

== History ==
Entertainment industry labor unions use the studio zone to determine per diem rates, work rules, and workers' compensation for union workers. For example, entertainment works produced within the area are considered "local" and workers are responsible for paying for their own meals and transportation to work sites; those outside the zone are considered "on location" and the studios are generally expected to pay for these expenses.

During most of the 20th century, the Hollywood entertainment industry preferred to film movies and television shows within the studio zone to reduce labor costs. Thus, the zone largely determined the location and success of the original movie ranches in or near Hollywood. By establishing movie ranches within the boundary of the zone, studios could take advantage of Los Angeles's varied landscape. With clever editing, it was easy to use a few aerial and location shots (usually shot by a second unit), along with carefully dressed sets, to give viewers the impression that a movie or show was set elsewhere.

The studio zone itself, as well as the lack of motion picture production companies and experienced personnel outside the zone, made it expensive to film on location, since movie studios had to bring everything needed from Los Angeles. Conversely, anyone who wanted to start a career in the entertainment industry needed to move to Los Angeles to break into the studio zone. For example, a 2001 analysis of geographical data found that the vast majority of screenwriters, grips, casting directors, talent agents, and talent managers based in Southern California either live within or just outside of the studio zone.

=== Boundaries ===
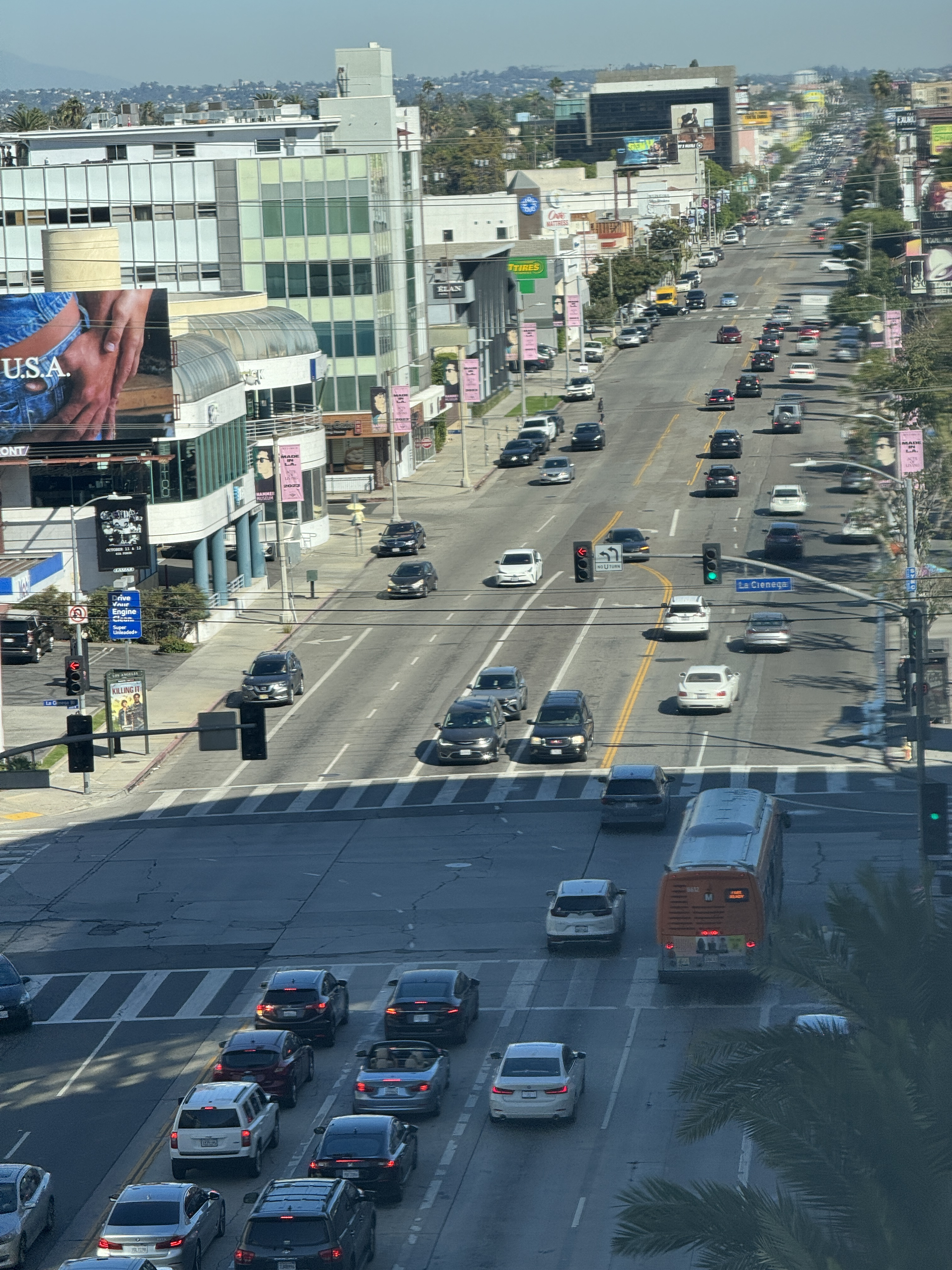
Beverly Boulevard with the La Cienega Boulevard intersection in the foreground (2023)

The studio zone's boundaries have expanded over the years, primarily to keep labor costs down and help keep Los Angeles as an attractive site to shoot productions. The studio zone was formally first established in 1934, originally defined as a 6-mile (10 km) radius from Rossmore Avenue and 5th Street. By 1970, the center of the zone became Beverly and La Cienega boulevards in the Beverly Grove, Los Angeles, neighborhood, the then-headquarters of the Association of Motion Picture and Television Producers (AMPTP), and expanded to a 30-mile (48 km) radius.

In addition to the traditional 30-mile (48 km) radius from Beverly and La Cienega boulevards, the studio zone also includes some locations that technically lie outside the area, such as the Metro-Goldwyn-Mayer Conejo Ranch near Thousand Oaks in Ventura County, and Castaic Lake in northwestern Los Angeles County.

In 2010, additional locations were added: Agua Dulce, the entire community of Castaic (in addition to Castaic Lake), Leo Carrillo State Park, Moorpark, Ontario International Airport, Piru, and Pomona (including the Fairplex, of which a small portion is jurisdictionally in La Verne).

With respect to the locations added in 2010, producers are required to grant reasonable requests to actors for hotel accommodations if the locations listed above lie over 4 miles (6 km) outside of the original 30-mile (48 km) zone. Locations rejected in negotiations included adding Lancaster and Port Hueneme to the zone. The addition of Pomona to the studio zone has led to an increase in filming in that city.

Since the 1990s, many countries and other U.S. states have offered generous tax credits or deductions to offset the much higher cost of filming on location and thereby break the self-reinforcing loop which had kept the American film industry centered on the thirty-mile zone for so many decades. The result was what Hollywood people call runaway production. Places such as Pittsburgh, Pennsylvania; New Orleans, Louisiana; Atlanta, Georgia; and Vancouver, British Columbia, Canada, have become popular—and cheaper—alternatives to filming in Los Angeles and New York City.

== In popular culture ==
The initials of the Fox Corporation–owned tabloid news website and TV series TMZ stand for "Thirty Mile Zone", an abbreviation for the studio zone.

== See also ==
- Filming location
- Movie ranch
- Vasquez Rocks
