= Beverly Boulevard =

Thoroughfare in Los Angeles, United States

Coordinates: 34°04′33″N 118°19′40″W

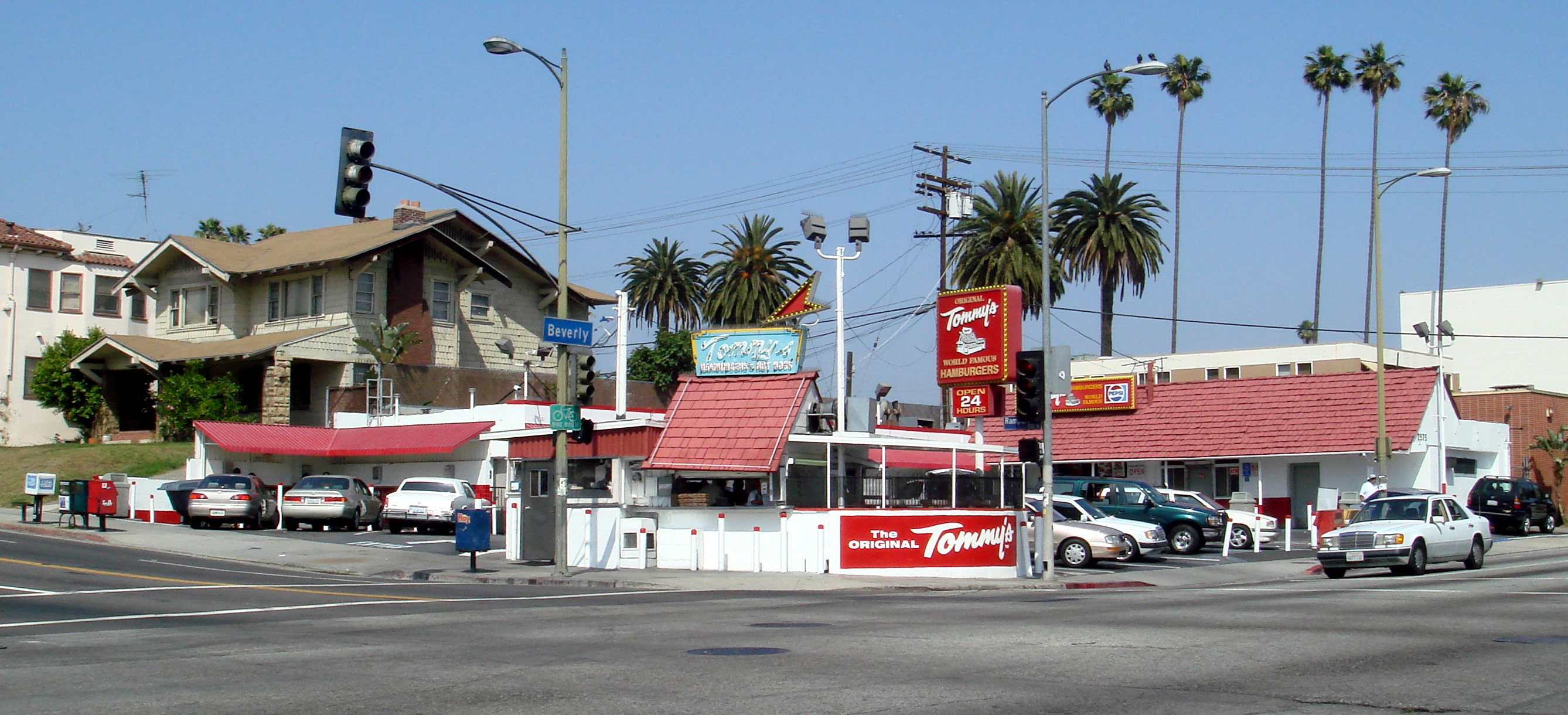
- Original Tommy's at the corner of Rampart and Beverly Blvd.
- Interactive map of Beverly Boulevard
- Location: Los Angeles, California, U.S.
- Nearest metro station: Vermont/Beverly
- West end: Santa Monica Boulevard in Beverly Hills
- East end: Glendale Boulevard in Westlake

Beverly Boulevard is one of the main east–west thoroughfares in Los Angeles, in the U.S. state of California. It begins off Santa Monica Boulevard in Beverly Hills and ends on the Lucas Avenue overpass near downtown Los Angeles to become 1st Street. A separate Beverly Boulevard (carrying Montebello Transit line 40 and nearby Atlantic E Line station) begins off 3rd Street and Pomona Boulevard in East Los Angeles, runs through Montebello and Pico Rivera, and becomes Turnbull Canyon Road in Whittier near Rose Hills Memorial Park.

Landmarks along Beverly Boulevard include the Television City studios, Westlake Recording Studios, the Beverly Center mall and other shops in the La Cienega Design Quarter, and its intersection with La Cienega Boulevard that is traditionally considered the epicenter of the studio zone.

== Background ==
Beverly Boulevard from the Beverly Center
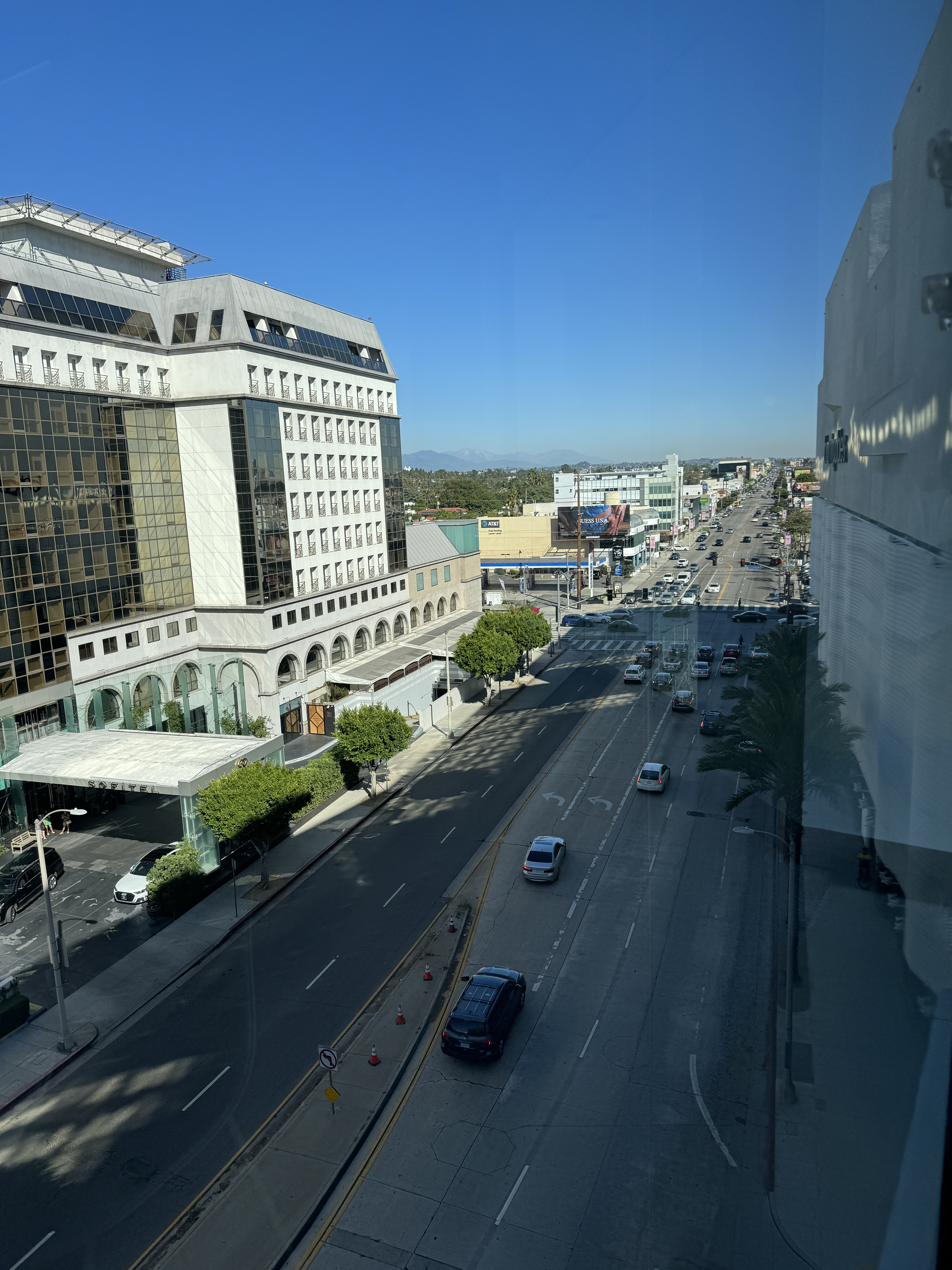
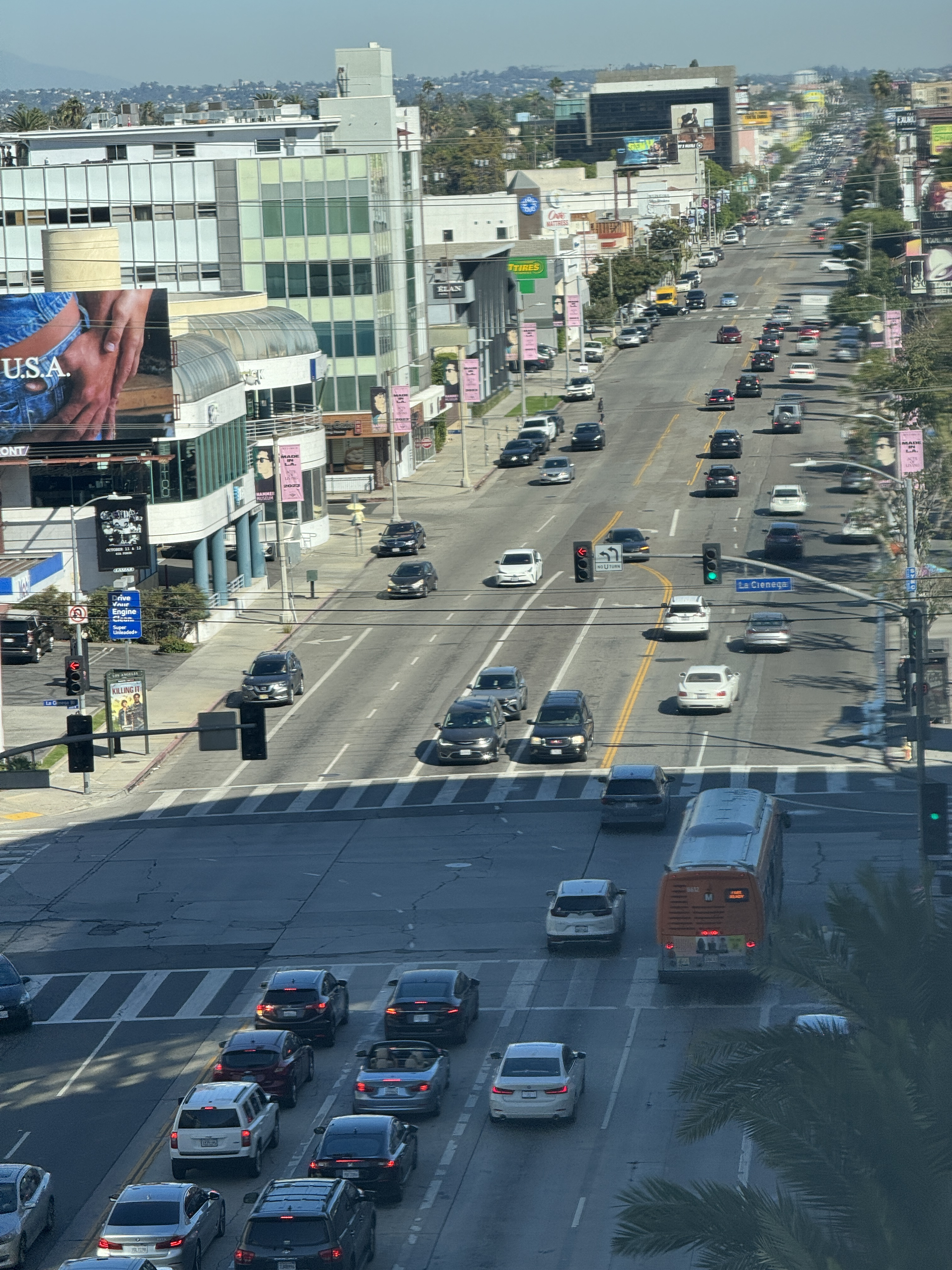
On the right 5x zoom showing the La Cienega Boulevard intersection (studio zone center) in the foreground (2023)

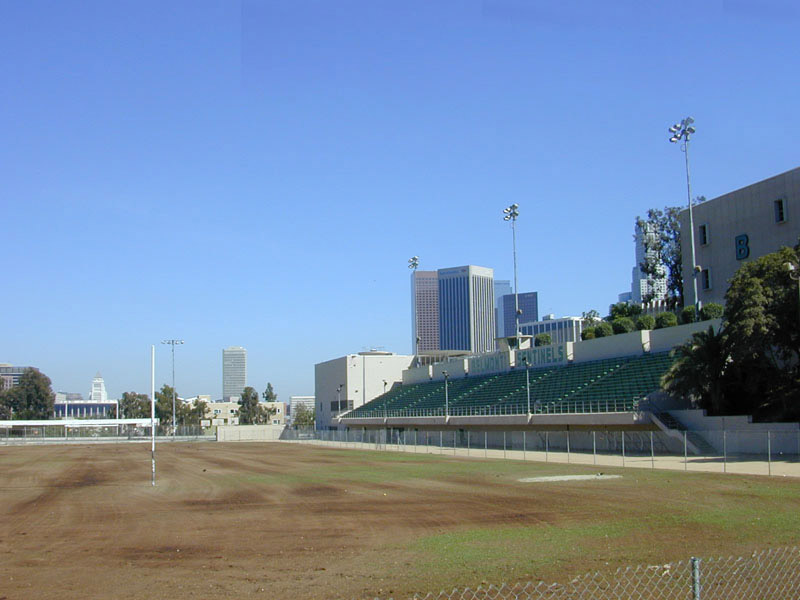
Belmont High School is located on Beverly Blvd. and Belmont Avenue

Work on paving Beverly Boulevard through Northwest Los Angeles began in the 1910s, making it one of Los Angeles's first boulevards.

The famous CBS Television City is located on the corner of Beverly and Fairfax, opposite The Grove. Original Tommy's, a famous Southern California burger chain, is located at the corner of Rampart and Beverly Boulevards. Also situated on Beverly Boulevard are studios belonging to Westlake Recording Studios, noted as the site where music albums such as Michael Jackson's Thriller were recorded.

== La Cienega Design Quarter ==
The area of Beverly Boulevard that intersects La Cienega Boulevard and its satellite streets is part of the La Cienega Design Quarter. Its shops and galleries house many antiques, furniture, rugs, accessories, and art. It is also the location of the Beverly Center shopping mall.

The southeast corner of Beverly and La Cienega Boulevards is considered the center of the studio zone, the 30-mile (48 km) radius used by the American entertainment industry to determine employee benefits for work performed inside and outside of it. It became the center of the zone in 1970 when it was the then-headquarters of the Association of Motion Picture and Television Producers (AMPTP).

== Education and transportation ==
- Belmont High School is located at Beverly Boulevard and Belmont Avenue.
- Metro Local line 14 operates on Beverly Boulevard.
- The Metro B Line serves an underground station at Vermont Avenue.
