= Northwest Los Angeles =

Region of Los Angeles, California, United States

Coordinates: 34.0911°N 118.2635°W

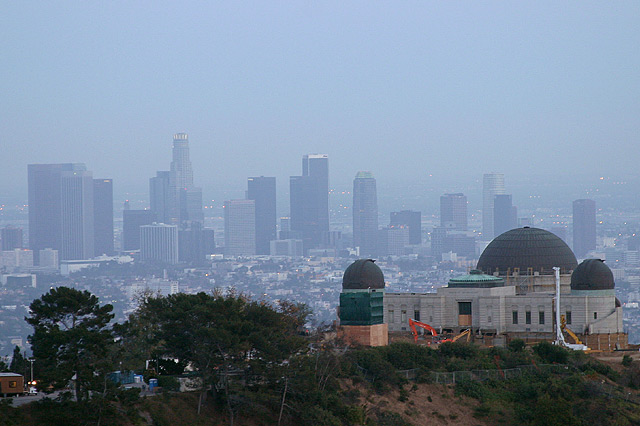
Griffith Park, the City's largest public park is in Northwest Los Angeles

Northwest Los Angeles or Northwest of Downtown is a group of neighborhoods near the central area of Los Angeles, California that are north and west of the city center of Los Angeles, California. This name for the area has been in use off and on for over 100 years, originally applying to Angelino Heights and gradually shifting northwesterly as those areas were built out.

Typically, the names of the individual neighborhoods are used rather than the collective term "Northwest Los Angeles." It is home to the biggest public parks in the City and offers multiple recreational opportunities.

Los Feliz and parts of Silver Lake have always been expensive and home to Hollywood celebrities (and originally, some of the Hollywood studios themselves). Silver Lake and Elysian Heights were also artist communities. But since the 1990s other neighborhoods in this area have experienced substantial gentrification. This has gradually displaced various immigrant and poor communities.

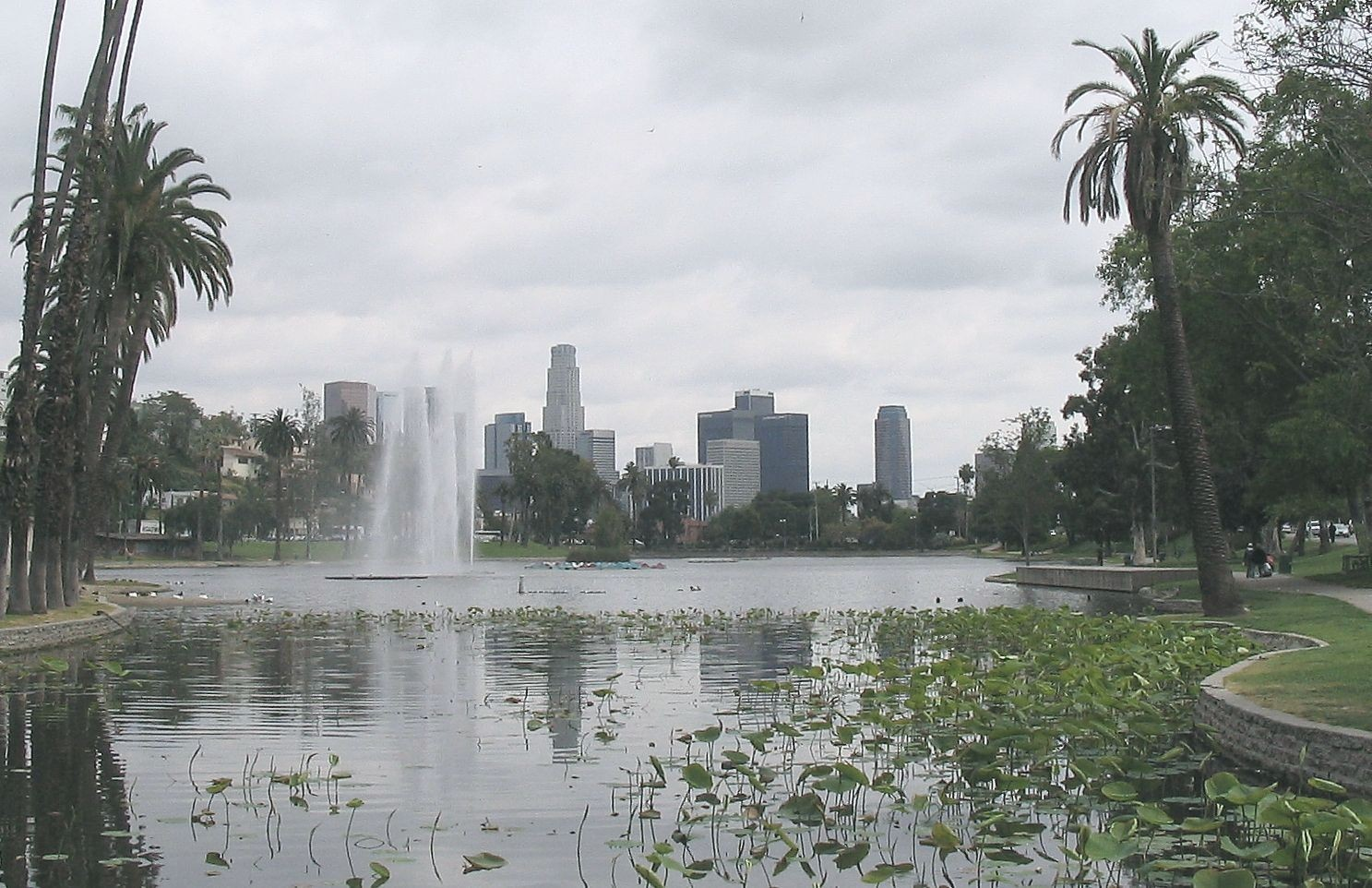
Echo Lake in Echo Park

Most of the neighborhoods are represented by Councilmember Hugo Soto-Martinez, but some are represented by Nithya Raman or Eunisses Hernandez and other councilmembers.

The following are neighborhoods in Northwest Los Angeles:

- Angelino Heights
- Echo Park
- Elysian Heights
- Elysian Park
- Elysian Valley
- Historic Filipinotown
- Los Feliz
- Pico-Union
- Silver Lake
- Solano Canyon
- Sunset Junction
- Westlake
- Franklin Hills
