= List of ethnic enclaves in North American cities =

Ethnic enclaves in North American cities
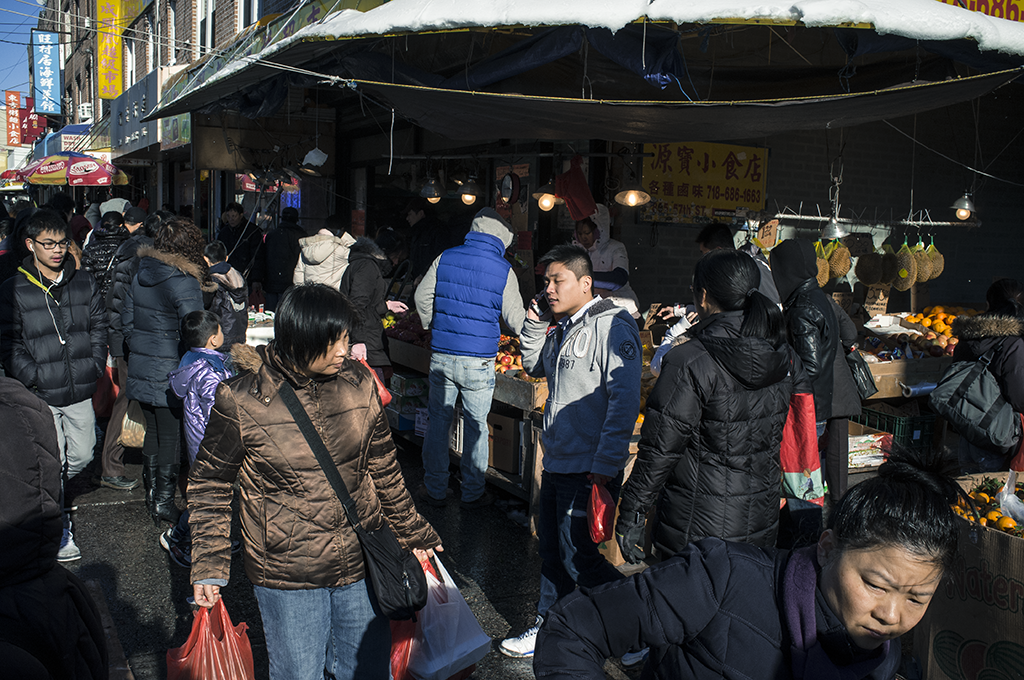
- New York City is home to the largest overseas Chinese population of any city proper in the Western Hemisphere, with over half million. Multiple large Chinatowns in Manhattan, Brooklyn (above), and Queens are thriving as traditionally urban ethnic enclaves, as large-scale Chinese immigration continues into New York, with the largest metropolitan Chinese population outside of Asia.

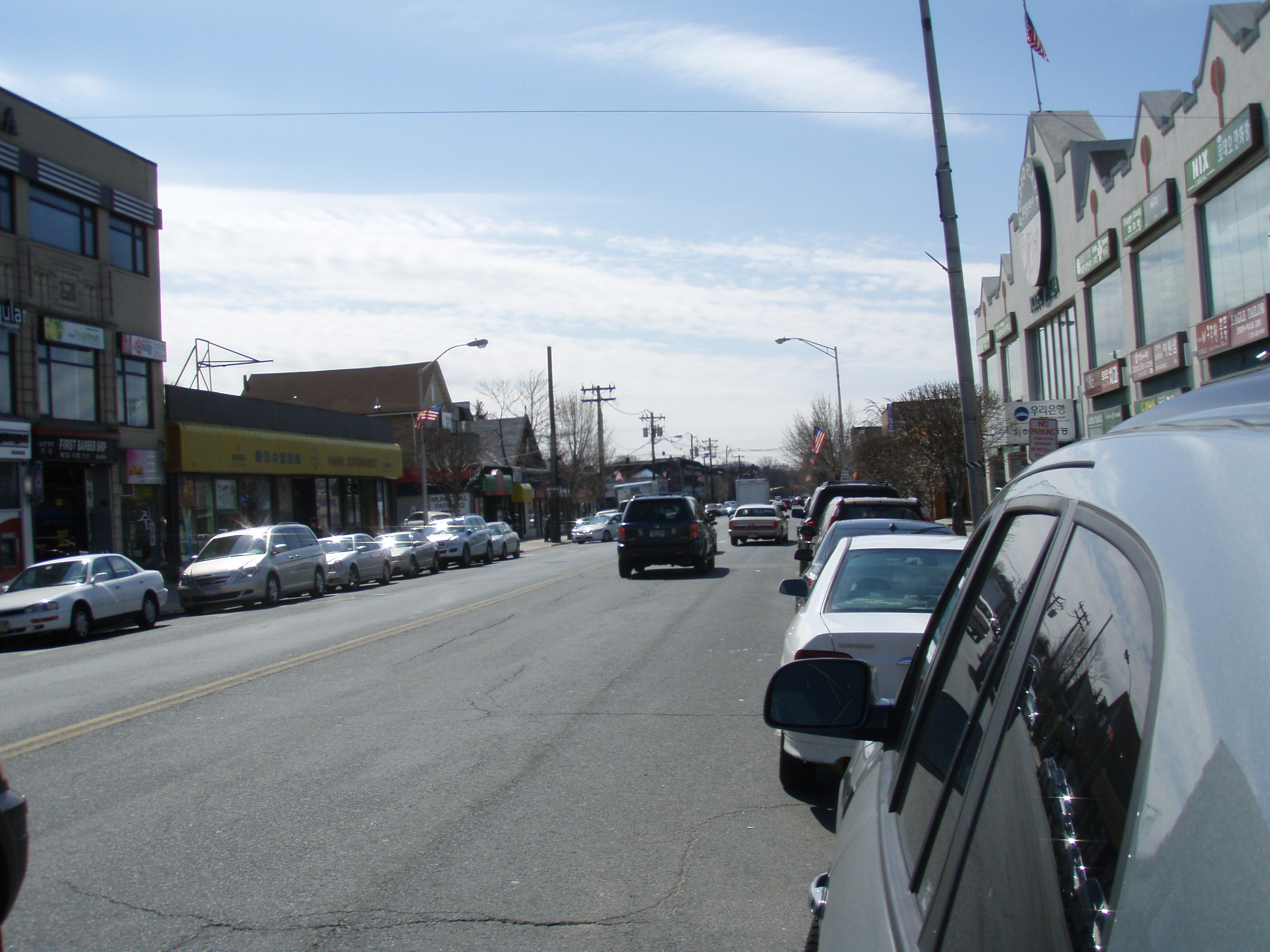
Broad Avenue, Koreatown in Palisades Park, Bergen County, New Jersey, USA, where Koreans constitute the majority (52%) of the population.

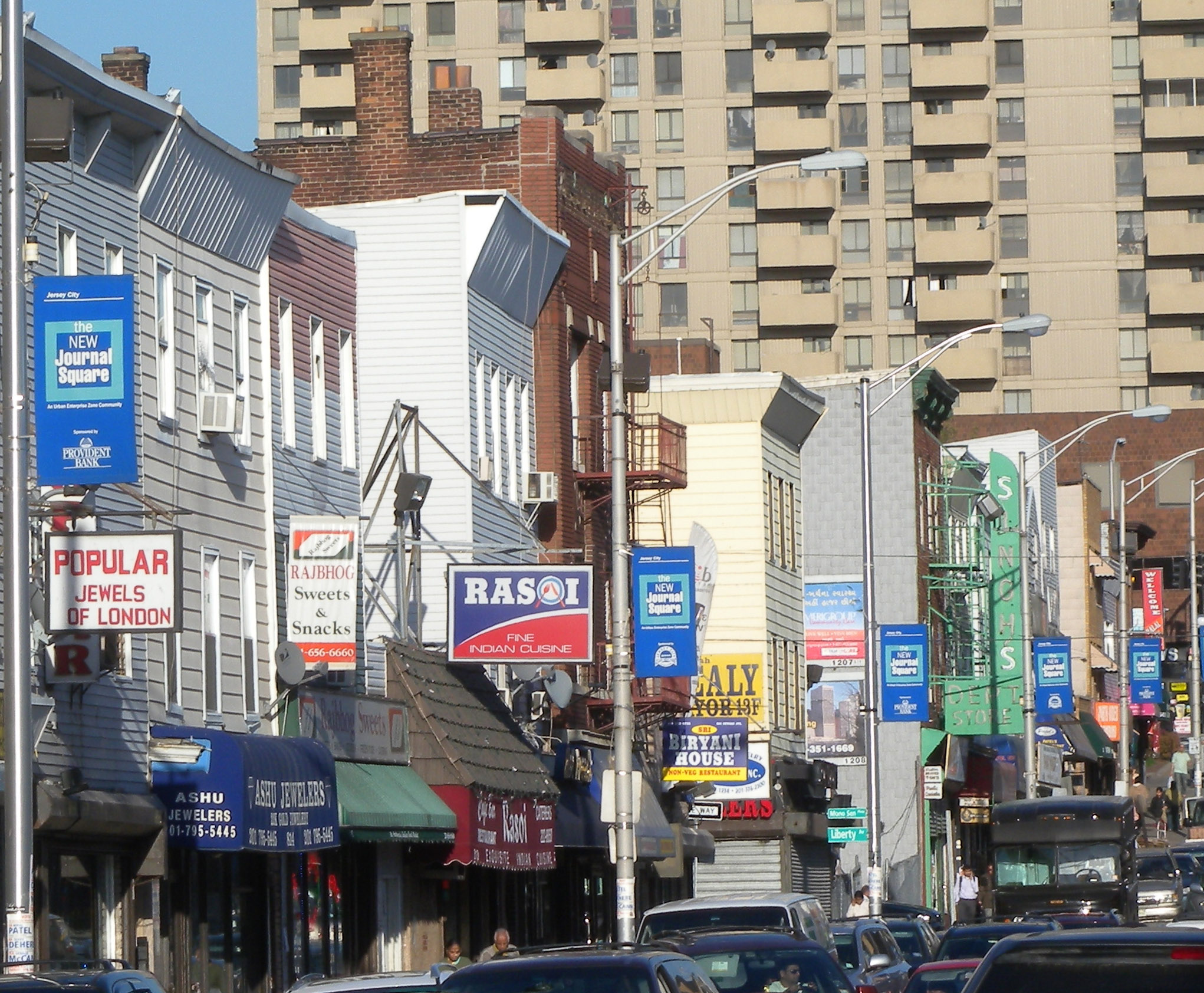
India Square in Jersey City, New Jersey, United States, is one of at least 24 Indian American enclaves characterized as a Little India which have emerged within the New York City Metropolitan Area, with the largest metropolitan Indian population outside Asia, as large-scale immigration from India continues into New York.

This is a list of ethnic enclaves in cities in North America. An ethnic enclave in this context denotes an area primarily populated by a population with a similar ethnic or racial background that is different from the majority population of the country or city it is in. This list includes historic examples which may no longer be ethnic enclaves.

== Africa ==
=== African Americans ===
List of African-American neighborhoods - Thousands of African-American neighborhoods exist today. However, many of these communities are now less populated by African Americans than they were during the earlier, sometimes mid and late parts of the 20th century.

=== Cape Verde ===
- Campello, Brockton, Massachusetts

=== Ethiopia ===
- Little Ethiopia, Los Angeles, California – largest Ethiopian community outside Africa.
- Little Ethiopia, Shaw, Washington, D.C.
- Little Ethiopia, Silver Spring, Maryland
- Little Ethiopia, Alexandria, Virginia

=== Nigeria ===
- Little Lagos, Houston, Texas

=== Senegal ===
- Little Senegal, New York City, New York

=== Somalia ===
- Little Mogadishu, Minneapolis, Minnesota – largest Somali community in North America

=== Pan-Africa ===
- Little Africa, The Bronx, New York City, New York
- Little Africa, Staten Island, New York City, New York

== Asia (East, South and Southeast) ==
=== Afghanistan ===
- Little Kabul, Fremont, California
- Little Kabul, Chicago, Illinois

=== Bangladesh ===
- Little Bangladesh, Los Angeles, California
- Bangladesh Boulevard, Paterson, New Jersey
- Little Bangladesh, Kensington, Brooklyn, New York City, New York
- Bangladesh Street, Jackson Heights, Queens, New York City, New York
- Little Bangladesh, Jamaica, Queens, New York City, New York

=== Cambodia ===
- Cambodia Town, Long Beach, California
- Chambodia, Chamblee, Georgia
- Cambodia Town, Lowell, Massachusetts
- Little Cambodia, The Bronx, New York City, New York
- Cambodia Town, Philadelphia, Pennsylvania

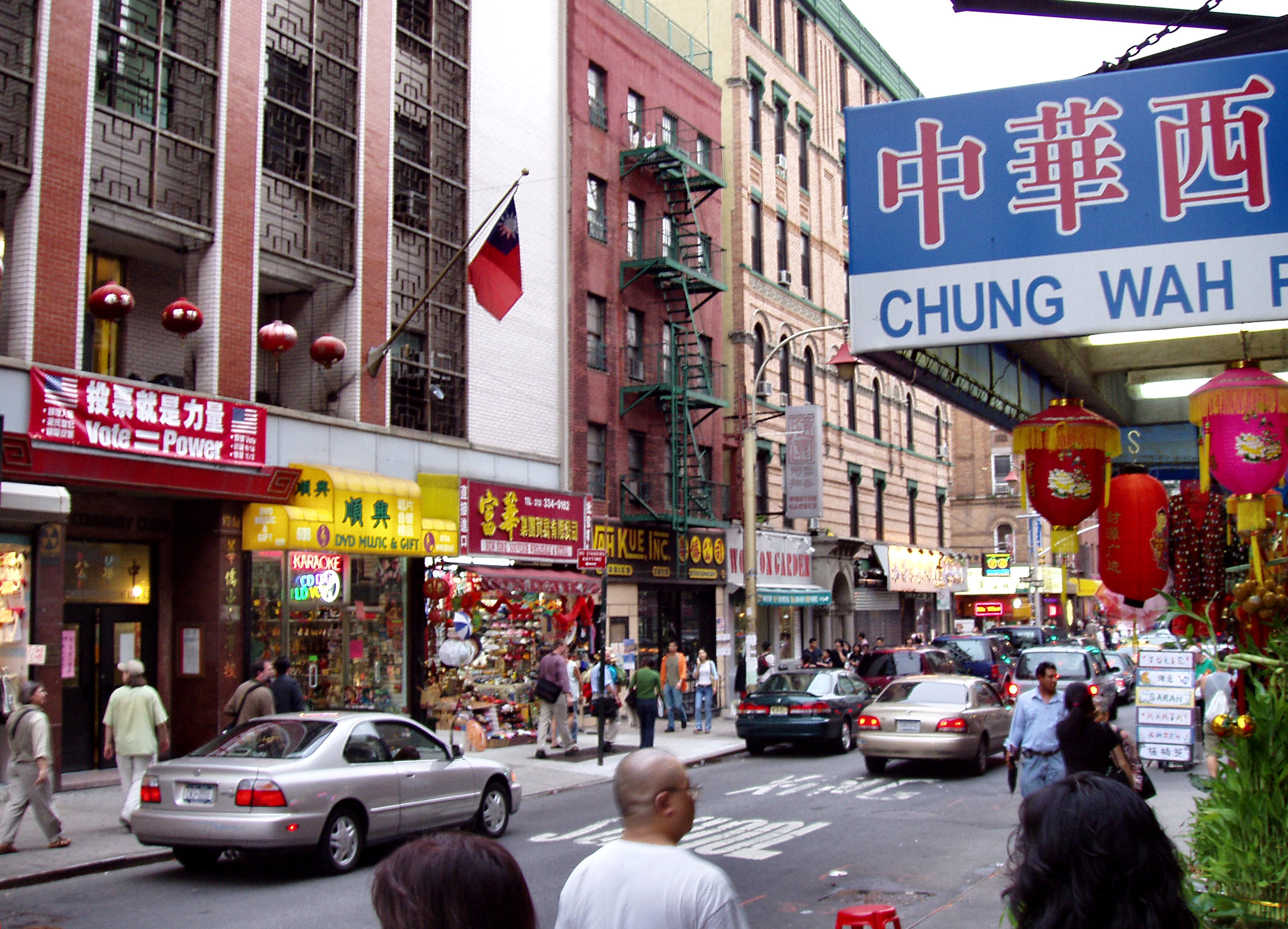
Manhattan's Chinatown, home to the highest concentration of Chinese people in the Western Hemisphere, is the oldest of at least 9 Chinatowns in the New York City Metropolitan Area.

=== China ===
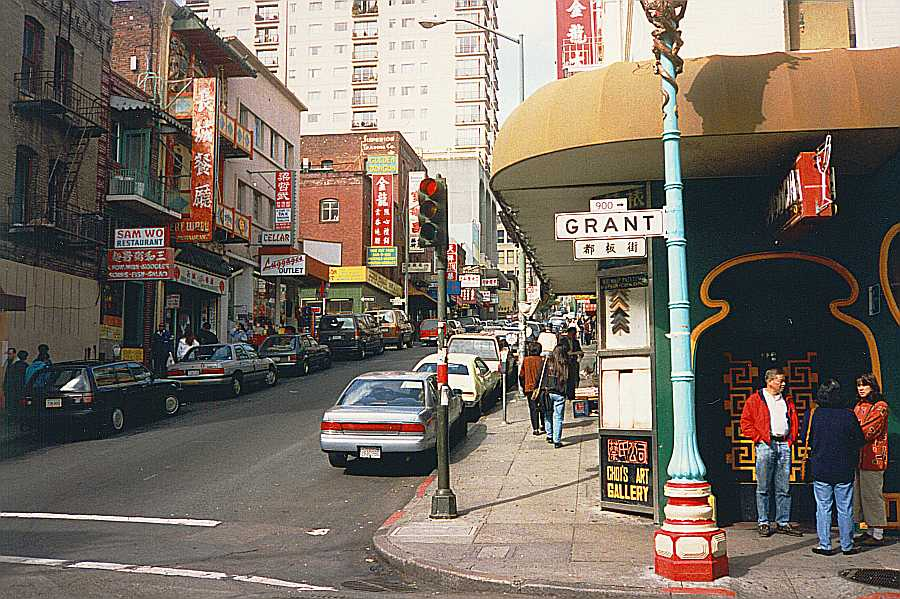
Chinatown, San Francisco

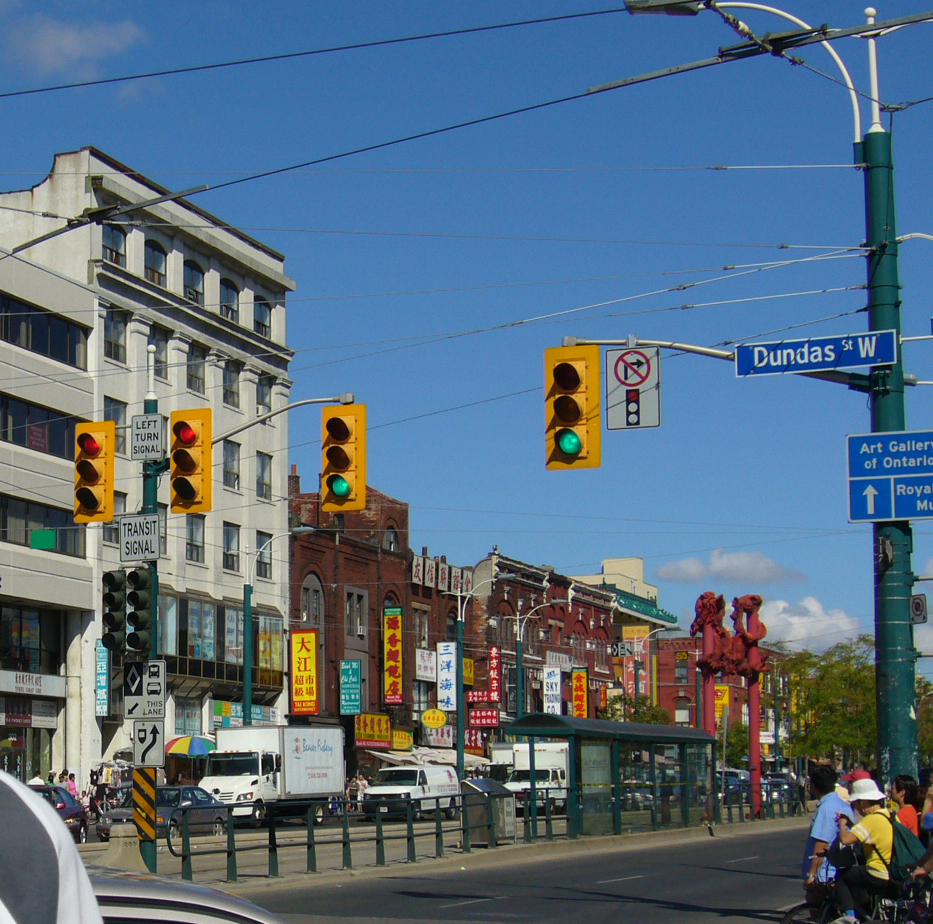
Toronto's downtown Chinatown

- Chinatown, Calgary, Alberta
- Chinatown, Edmonton, Alberta
- La Chinesca, Mexicali, Baja California
- La Mesa, Tijuana, Baja California
- Chinatown, Vancouver, British Columbia
- Chinatown, Fresno, California
- Chinatown, Los Angeles, California
- Chinatown, Monterey Park, California
- Oakland Chinatown, Oakland, California
- Chinatown, Sacramento, California
- Chinatown, San Francisco, California
- New Chinatown, Richmond District, San Francisco, California
- Chinatown, Washington, D.C.
- Chinatown, Chamblee, Georgia
- Chinatown, Honolulu, Hawaii
- Chinatown, Chicago, Illinois
- Havana Chinatown, Havana, La Habana
- Chinatown, Baltimore, Maryland
- New Chinatown, Rockville, Maryland
- Chinatown, Boston, Massachusetts
- Chinatown, Allston, Boston, Massachusetts
- Chinatown, Malden, Massachusetts
- Chinatown, Quincy, Massachusetts
- Chinatown Plaza, Spring Valley, Nevada
- Chinatown Sunset Park, Brooklyn, New York City, New York
- Chinatown, Manhattan, New York City, New York
- Chinatown, Flushing, Queens, New York City, New York
- Chinatown, Markham, Ontario
- Mississauga Chinese Centre, Mississauga, Ontario
- Chinatown, Richmond Hill, Ontario
- Chinatown, Toronto, Ontario
- East Chinatown, Toronto, Ontario
- Chinatown, Scarborough, Toronto, Ontario
- Chinatown, Windsor, Ontario
- Old Town Chinatown, Portland, Oregon
- Chinatown, Philadelphia, Pennsylvania
- Chinatown, Pittsburgh, Pennsylvania
- Chinatown, Brossard, Quebec – has the largest Chinese population in Quebec
- Chinatown, Montreal, Quebec
- Chinatown West, Montreal, Quebec
- Chinatown, Houston, Texas
- DFW China Town, Richardson, Texas
- Chinatown, Salt Lake City, Utah
- CID East, Bellevue, Washington
- Chinatown, Seattle, Washington

=== Hmong ===
- Ban Vinai Village, Fresno, California
- Little Mekong, Saint Paul, Minnesota

=== India ===
- Little India, Surrey, British Columbia
- Punjabi Market, Vancouver, British Columbia
- Little India, Artesia, California
- Little India, Winnipeg, Manitoba
- India Square, Jersey City, New Jersey
- Little India, Middlesex County, New Jersey
- Little India, Oyster Bay, New York
- Browntown, Brampton, Ontario
- Little India, London, Ontario
- Gerrard India Bazaar, Toronto, Ontario

=== Japan ===
- Alameda, California (historic; still has a significant Japanese-American community)
- Leimert Park, Los Angeles (mainly Japanese from 1920s-50s)
- Little Tokyo, Cuauhtémoc, Mexico City
- Markham, Ontario near Toronto, Ontario in Canada
- Cambridge, MA
- Honolulu, Hawaii
- Sakura Square, Denver
- Japantown, San Francisco
- Torrance, California
- Gardena, California
- Berkeley, California
- Cupertino, California
- Edmonton, Alberta

=== Korea ===
- Koreatown, Toronto
- Koreatown North, Willowdale, Toronto
- Little Seoul, Garden Grove, California
- Koreatown, Los Angeles, California
- Annandale, Virginia
- Barrio Coreano (Guatemala City), also known as Avenida Seúl
- Fort Lee, New Jersey (as well as Japanese)
- Buena Park, California
- Fullerton, California
- Irvine, California (among other Asians)
- Little Seoul, Newport News, Virginia
- Pequeño Seúl – Mexico City
- Riverside, California
- Santa Clara County, California Contains several "Koreatown" districts in Santa Clara (Unmarked) and San Jose (See Koreatown, San Jose)
- Aurora, Colorado
- Duluth, Georgia
- Koreatown, Ellicott City, Maryland

=== Laos ===
- Chollas View, San Diego, California – Laotian immigrant enclave
- Weed, California
- Lowell, Massachusetts
- Parts of Twin Cities, Minnesota
- Stockton, California
- International Boulevard, Oakland, California

=== Myanmar (Burma) ===
- Little Burma, Fort Wayne, Indiana
- Chindianapolis, Southport, Indiana
- Indianapolis, Indiana (about 24,000, ~2.8% of total population), especially Perry Township, Marion County
- Greenwood, Indiana
- Tulsa, Oklahoma – home to Zomi Town
- Albany, New York – (Primarily Karen)
- Buffalo, New York
- Rogers Park, Chicago (Rohingya)
- Milwaukee (likely home to the largest Rohingya population in the US)

=== Pakistan ===
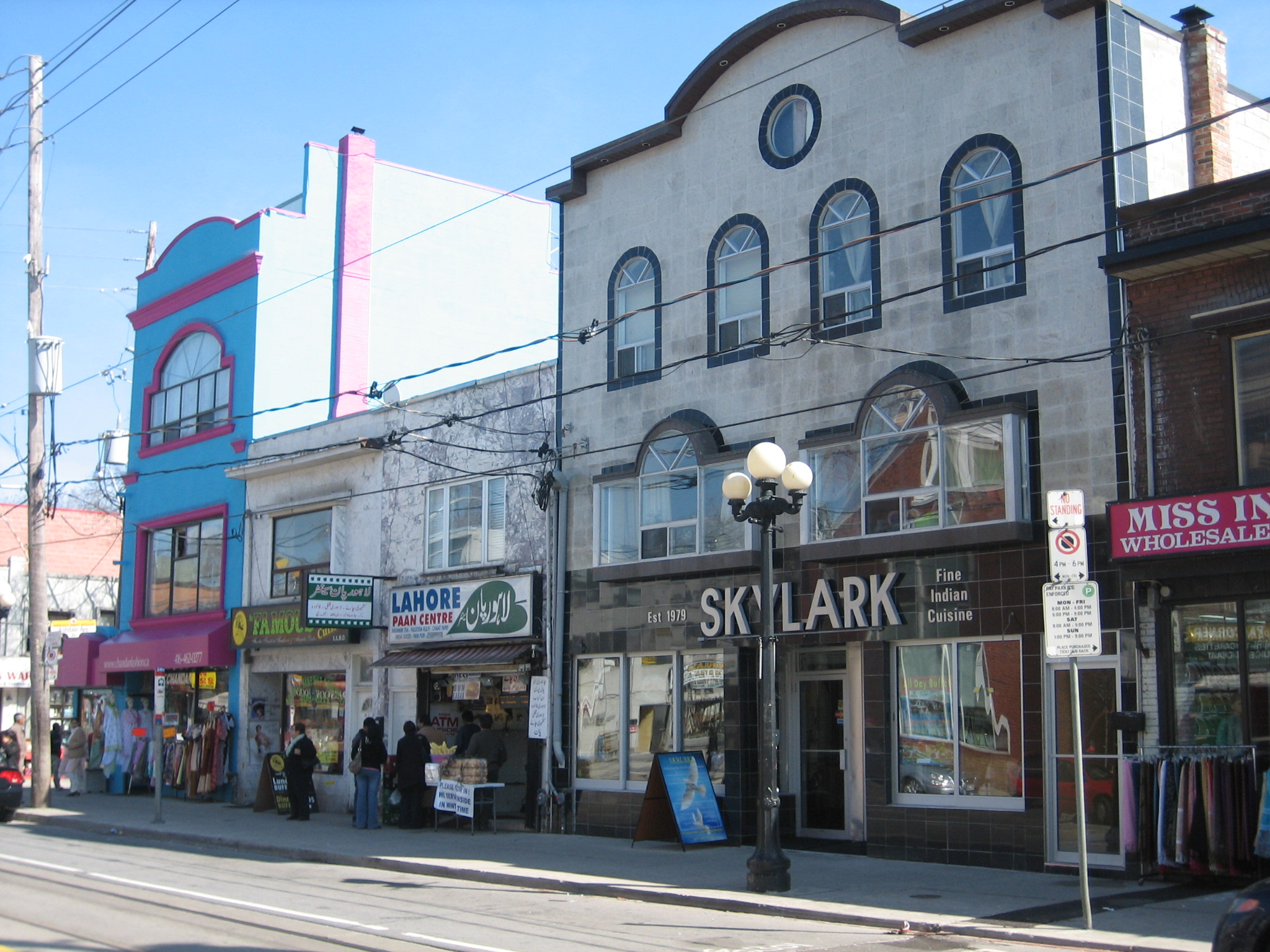
Pakistani and other South Asian shops in Gerrard Street, Toronto.

- Little Pakistan in Flatbush, Brooklyn, New York City
- Westwood, Los Angeles, California – also has Persians from Iran (Persia Square)
- Thorncliffe Park, Toronto, Ontario
- Jackson Heights, Queens, New York City
- Fremont, California
- Sacramento metropolitan area in California – highest concentrations in Roseville, Arden-Arcade, Folsom, Elk Grove, and Rancho Cordova
- Dublin, California
- Irvine, California
- Pleasanton, California
- Walnut Creek, California
- San Ramon, California
- Eastvale, California
- Riverside, California – highest concentrations in Orangecrest, Arlington, and University District
- Corona, California
- Rancho Cucamonga, California
- Tracy, California
- Parts of Stockton, California
- Houston, Texas
- Stafford, Texas
- Katy, Texas
- Irving, Texas
- Frisco, Texas
- Plano, Texas
- Sugar Land, Texas
- Missouri City, Texas
- Cinco Ranch, Texas
- Arlington, Texas
- Parts of Austin, Texas
- Hamtramck, Michigan
- Troy, Michigan
- Devon Avenue in Chicago, Illinois
- Naperville, Illinois
- Bolingbrook, Illinois
- Montgomery County, Maryland
- Columbia, Maryland
- Ellicott City, Maryland
- Aurora, Colorado
- Northern Virginia – highest concentration is in Fairfax County
- Saddle Ridge, Calgary, Alberta – other areas throughout the city have smaller but significant concentrations of Pakistanis
- Broward County, Florida
- Mississauga, Ontario
- Milton, Ontario
- Northern San Diego, California
- Bellevue, Washington
- Kent, Washington
- Bothell, Washington
- Norcross, Georgia

=== Philippines ===
- Carson, California – has a "Little Manila"
- Cerritos, California
- Daly City, California
- Historic Filipinotown, Los Angeles, California
- Broadmoor, California
- Union City, California
- Stockton, California
- Brentwood, California
- Lathrop, California
- Rancho Cucamonga, California
- South San Francisco, California
- Outer Mission, San Francisco
- Delano, California – where "Larry Itliong Day" was dedicated
- Kansas City, Missouri
- "Philly-pino-town" Philadelphia, Pennsylvania
- Jacksonville, Florida
- Torrance, California.
- West Covina, California, centered on "Manila Way" on Amar Rd. and Azusa Ave
- Sacramento metropolitan area in California
- West Valley City, Utah
- Beacon Hill and Rainier Valley in Seattle, Washington
- Winnipeg, Manitoba
- Little Manila, Toronto
- Scarborough, Toronto
- Lower Mainland, British Columbia

=== Sri Lanka ===
- Covina, California area with a Sri Lankan community center in West Covina, California
- Little Sri Lanka, Tompkinsville, Staten Island, New York City
- Toronto (Malvern) (Toronto is home to the largest Tamil-speaking population outside of South Asia)
- Cerritos, California and Artesia, California
- Union City, California
- Fremont, California
- San Diego (Miramar)
- Orange County, California (Irvine and Anaheim Hills)

=== Taiwan ===
- Little Taipei, Rowland Heights, California
- Little Taipei, Flushing, Queens, New York City, New York

=== Thailand ===
- North side Chicago, Illinois
- Thai Town, Los Angeles, California

=== Vietnam ===
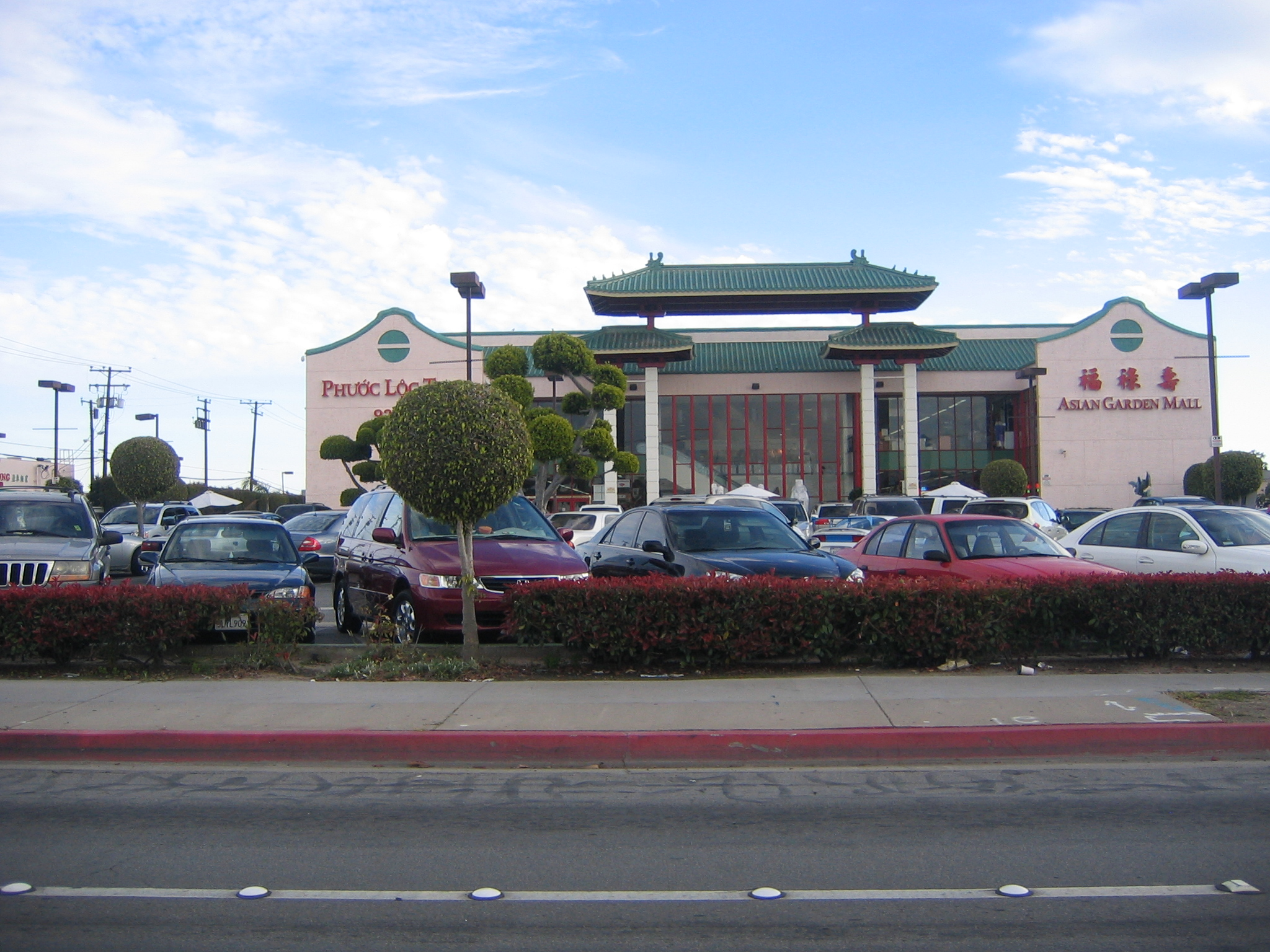
Little Saigon, Orange County, California

- White Center, Washington/Tacoma, Washington/South Seattle/Chinatown-International District, Seattle
- Argyle, Chicago, Illinois
- Little Saigon Business District on Federal in Denver, Colorado
- Little Saigon in Southeast Albuquerque, New Mexico
- Arlington, Texas
- Bay St. Louis, Mississippi
- Biloxi, Mississippi
- D'Iberville, Mississippi
- Little Saigon, Orange County, California
- San Jose, California
- Little Saigons in Massachusetts
- New Orleans, Louisiana (Village de L'Est)
- Little Saigon, Oklahoma City, Oklahoma
- Portland, Oregon – there is a large Vietnamese community in North Portland and Beaverton
- Fairfax County, Virginia
- Atlanta, Georgia area
- Houston, Texas
- Stockton, California
- Little Saigon, Vancouver, British Columbia

=== Pan-Asia ===
- Asiatown, Cleveland, Ohio – formerly known as "Chinatown"
- Little Asia, Plano, Texas

== European or Anglo origin ==
=== Australia ===
- Manhattan, New York
- Santa Monica, California
- Whistler, British Columbia

=== Albania ===
- Albanian Town, Chicago
- Astoria, Queens, New York City, New York
- Detroit, Michigan – See also: History of the Albanian Americans in Metro Detroit
- Pelham Parkway (neighborhood), Bronx, New York City, New York
- South Boston, Boston, Massachusetts
- Worcester, Massachusetts
- Toronto, Ontario, Canada
- Small sections of Scottsdale, Arizona
- Waterbury, Connecticut

=== Basque ===
- Malheur County, Oregon

Basque shepherds migrated to Southeastern Oregon settling in the communities of Arock, Basque, Burns and Jordan Valley.

- Elko, Nevada
- Reno, Nevada
- Boise, Idaho
- Bakersfield, California

=== Belarus ===
- Little Russia, San Francisco and areas adjacent to Ocean Beach, San Francisco
- Chicagoland
- New York City

=== Belgium ===
- Sarnia, Ontario, Canada – "Flemish or Dutch Corridor" to Chatham, Ontario

=== Bosnian ===
(People with origins from Bosnia and Herzegovina):

- Bowling Green Kentucky
- Chicago, Illinois -
- San Jose, California/Campbell, California
- St. Louis, Missouri -
- Salt Lake Valley, Utah
- East Utica, New York

=== Croatia ===
- San Pedro, Los Angeles
- Pueblo, Colorado

=== Eastern European Jewish ===
- Orange Park, Florida in the Jacksonville, Florida area – in addition, has non-Jewish Slavic groups, Romanians, Hungarians and Albanians
- Rockland County, New York – Highest proportion of Jews of any county in the United States. Most are of the Satmar sect of Hasidism. In the town of Kiryas Joel, 95% of families spoke Yiddish at home.
- Williamsburg, Brooklyn – Home to many Orthodox and Hasidic communities
- Crown Heights, Brooklyn – Home to the headquarters of the Chabad Movement. Crown Heights has a large historical population of Orthodox and Hasidic Jews.
- Richmond District, San Francisco and Little Russia

=== France ===
- French Quarter, New Orleans
- Belden Place, San Francisco
- Linden, Alabama
- Reynoldston, New York in Franklin County, New York facing Quebec, Canada
- Most of Quebec as well as much of Acadia in Canada
- French Town, Los Angeles (historic, Basque)
- There are French communities throughout California and Louisiana, especially the latter; some French-language radio stations exist in rural northern Louisiana, and while French language and French-American people no longer hold prominence in the French Quarter of New Orleans, it retains its French culture
- Madawaska, Maine and Lewiston, Maine, and Northern Maine
- Manchester, New Hampshire, and Northern New Hampshire
- Little Canada, Minnesota, Argyle, Minnesota, Northern Minnesota - French Canadian mainly

=== Germany ===
- Deutschtown, Pittsburgh, Pennsylvania.
- Hanover, Pennsylvania.
- Pennsylvania Dutch Country (also Swiss in origin)
- St. Marys, Pennsylvania – Bavarian Catholic
- Over-the-Rhine, Cincinnati, Ohio
- Germantown & Schnitzelburg In Louisville (Historic)
- Fredericksburg, Texas and the Texas Hill Country
- Serbin, Texas (Sorbians)
- Jasper, Indiana
- Old World Village, Huntington Beach, California
- Hermann, Missouri

=== Georgia ===
- New York City

=== Greece ===
- Astoria, Queens, New York
- Campbell, Ohio
- Cleveland, Ohio/Parma
- Greektown, Tarpon Springs, Florida
- Greektown, Toronto
- Greektown, Vancouver, British Columbia
- Greektown, Montreal, Quebec
- Greek Town, Omaha, Nebraska (historic)
- La Merced historical Greektown in Mexico City along Calle Academia (Academia Street)
- Naucalpan, State of Mexico a large Greek community has formed outside of Mexico City
- New Smyrna Beach, Florida
- "Old Greek Town", Salt Lake City, Utah - the state has a Greek community, throughout the Salt Lake metropolitan area, and Ogden, UT
- Palm Desert, California – where they have an annual Greek festival near the local Greek Orthodox church
- Sinaloa, Mexico - this Mexican state has coastal Greek communities. The cities of Culiacan, Humaya, Tamazula and Yoreme have the largest Greek concentrations in Sinaloa where the cultivation of tomato brought them fortunes and the valley is known as "Valle de Grecia" or the "Greek Valley".
- Upper Darby Township, Pennsylvania
- West Los Angeles – historically, the Toy District in Downtown LA had Greeks. While less significant than it was in the early 20th century, the Byzantine-Latino Quarter section of Los Angeles has a Greek community that lives there, shops there, and holds an annual event there. There is also a Greek community in Long Beach and Orange County.
- While San Francisco or the Greater Bay Area does not have a Greek cultural district, there is a sizeable Greek community in the northern parts of San Francisco, in the western parts (i.e. Richmond and Sunset Districts) and in San Mateo County (esp. San Bruno and San Carlos), and Alameda County
- North Carolina has a prevalent Greek community, especially in Asheville, Charlotte, and Durham

=== Ireland ===
- Boston, Massachusetts (portions and many suburbs) – largest Irish city outside Ireland. Peak percentage nearing 50% in 1920 after 70 years of immigration
- Irish Hill, Louisville (historic)
- Richmond District, San Francisco
- Irish Channel, New Orleans
- Woodlawn Heights, Bronx

=== Italy ===
- Little Italy in Belmont, The Bronx
- Little Italy in Erie, Pennsylvania has the largest Italian-American population in the city. In Philadelphia, Italian immigrants initially settled in Bella Vista on the city's south side.
- Little Italy, North Beach, San Francisco
- Some communities in Oakland and Pittsburg, California
- Little Italy, Los Angeles, California (historic; now Chinatown)
- Little Italy, Manhattan, New York City and much of Long Island and Rochester
- Little Italy, San Diego, California.
- "Little Tuscany", Palm Springs, California
- McAlester, Oklahoma/Krebs, Oklahoma in historic Choctaw Nation.
- Clinton, Indiana - also holds one of the largest Italian cultural festivals in the Midwest
- Valdese, North Carolina; Charlotte
- Palm Desert, California
- Providence, Rhode Island
- Teterboro, New Jersey
- Tontitown, Arkansas – resettlement of earlier Italian community in Lake Village, Arkansas
- Via Italia, San Pedro, California
- Yorktown, New York
- Italian Canadians in Greater Montreal: La Petite-Italie, Saint-Leonard (Città Italiana), Rivière-des-Prairies, Montreal-Nord, LaSalle, and the Saint-Raymond area of Notre-Dame-de-Grâce
- Italian Canadians in the Greater Toronto Area: Little Italy, Corso Italia

=== Luxembourg ===
- Naperville, Illinois – also Liechtenstein residents
- Port Washington, Wisconsin
- St. Donatus, Iowa

=== Malta ===
- The Junction, Toronto, Ontario. Little Malta is in the western part of this Toronto neighbourhood
- Astoria, Queens has a Little Malta

=== Poland ===
- Polish Downtown, Chicago, Illinois
- Buffalo, New York
- Greenpoint, New York City
- Sunset District, Twin Peaks, and nearby Little Russia in San Francisco
- New Britain, Connecticut - largest Polish community percentage-wise in the U.S.
- Metro Detroit has Polish communities, especially in St. Clair Shores

=== Portugal ===
- Fall River, Massachusetts – has the highest concentration of Portuguese Americans in the U.S. at 43.9%
- Allentown, Pennsylvania – including Brazilians and other Latin Americans
- Artesia, California – sizable, in the "International District", known for ethnic diversity
- Little Portugal, Newark, New Jersey (Ironbound section)
- Little Portugal, San Jose (North and South)
- Little Portugal, Toronto

=== Romania ===
- Southwest Detroit and other areas of Metro Detroit
- Fort Myers, Florida
- Sunnyside, Queens, New York
- North York, Toronto and other areas of Toronto and the Greater Toronto Area
- Regina, Saskatchewan
- Oregon (Portland, Gresham, Oregon City)
- Lorain, Ohio

=== Russia ===
- Alaska
- Orange Park, Florida in the Jacksonville, Florida area – from throughout the former USSR and Soviet Bloc (Eastern Europe)
- Brighton Beach, New York in the Brooklyn area – large Russian and other ex-Soviet communities
- Woodburn, Oregon – large Russian Old believer community as well as Russian Molokans, Doukhobors and recent refugees from the former Soviet Union: Ukrainian and Russian Pentecostals and Baptists.
- Little Russia, Richmond District, San Francisco, California - Small part of San Francisco's Richmond district. Large Chinese population as well.
- West Hollywood, California
- Seattle, other parts of Western Washington especially Olympia and Bremerton
- Portland, Oregon
- Parts of Philadelphia
- Parts of Boston
- D.C. metro area/Virginia/Maryland
- Southern Maine
- Milwaukee area
- Detroit area
- Twin Cities, Minnesota
- Parts of Chicago
- Parts of New York City
- Vancouver, B.C.
- Winnipeg, Manitoba
- Toronto, ON
- Spartanburg, SC

=== Scandinavia ===
==== Denmark ====
- Elk Horn, Iowa
- Kimballton, Iowa
- Solvang, California
- Tyler, Minnesota

==== Finland ====
- Duluth, MN and the Twin Cities region
- Stanton Township, Michigan
- Portland, Oregon area
- Thunder Bay, Ontario, Canada
- Lake Worth Beach, Florida
- Sunset Park, Brooklyn, New York City, New York

==== Iceland ====
- Gimli, Manitoba, Canada – thought to be the largest Icelandic community outside Iceland.
- Spanish Fork, Utah – large concentration, most of them are Mormon in religion. See: Icelandic Heritage in Spanish Fork, Utah
- Washington Island, Wisconsin – an estimated 20% of Icelandic descent.

==== Norway ====
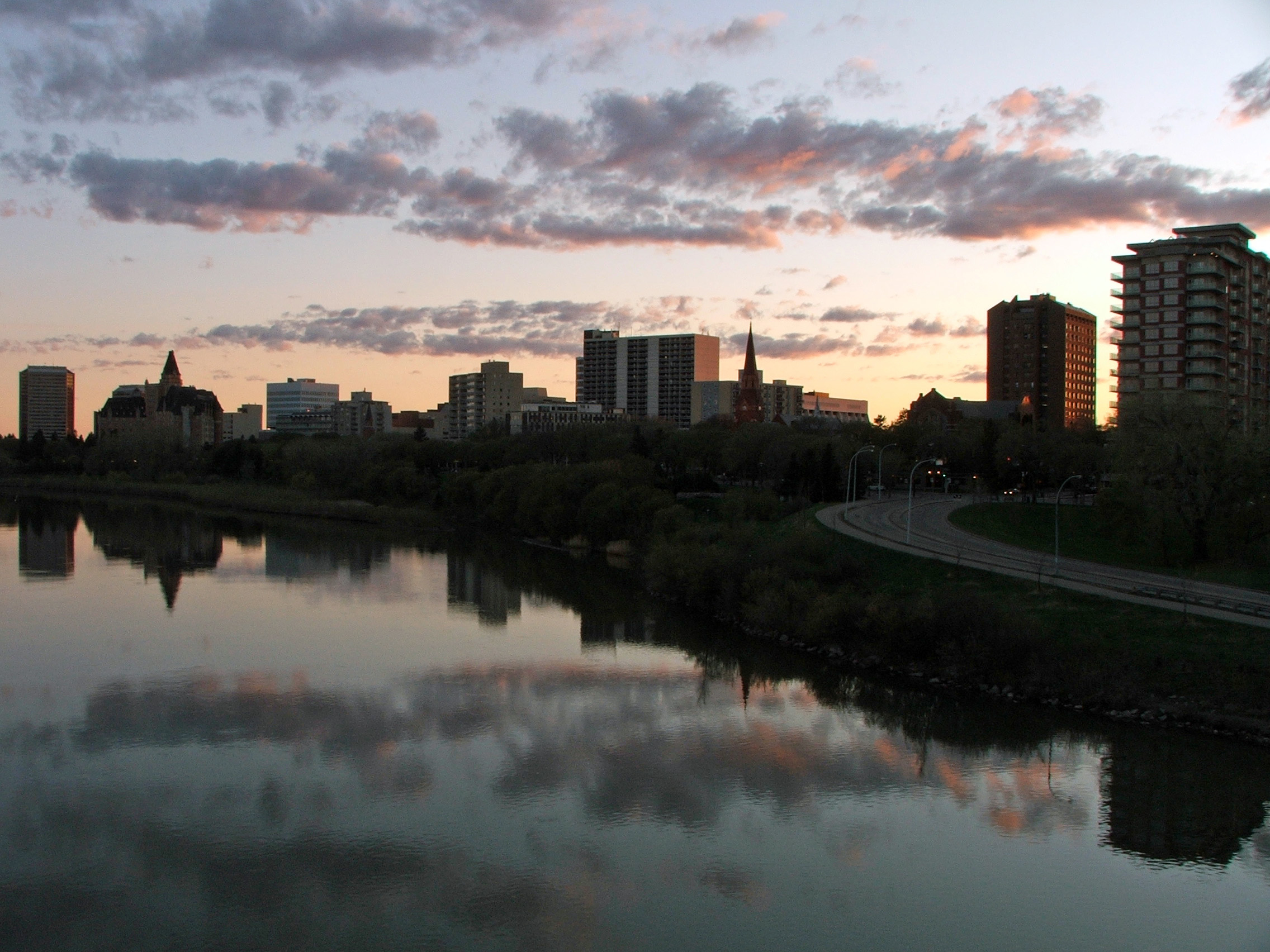
7% of the population in Saskatoon in Canada is of Norwegian ancestry.

- Saskatoon, Saskatchewan (est. 10% Norwegian ancestry and other Scandinavians)
- Lapskaus Boulevard, Brooklyn, New York City, New York

==== Sweden ====
- Chicago, Illinois – At one point, Chicago had the largest Swedish population outside Sweden. The neighborhood of Andersonville still maintains a large Swedish population.

=== Serbia ===
- Boyle Heights, Los Angeles (historic, Serbian-Americans moved out in 1940s-50s)
- Chicago, Illinois
- Ridgewood, Queens, New York

=== Slovenia ===
- Eveleth, Minnesota
- St. Vitus Village, Cleveland (Slovenian Village)
- Pueblo, Colorado

=== United Kingdom ===
==== Cornwall ====
- Butte, Montana
- Deadwood, South Dakota
- Grass Valley, California
- Iron Ranges of northern Michigan
- Mineral Point, Wisconsin
- Pachuca, Mexico (large Cornish-British colony)
- Tangier Island, Virginia

==== Wales ====
- Gallia County, Ohio – a.k.a. Little Wales
- Sharon, Pennsylvania

== West Asia ==
- Chicago – A section of city nicknamed "Little Iraq", Chicago has the largest Iraqi community in the U.S. Little Arabia in the city's Northwest side, for example, has many Arab-Americans.Devon Avenue (Chicago) also has Arabs, Iranians and South Asians such as Pashtun Americans.
- Cleveland, Ohio – west side
- Detroit (i.e. Southwest side) – over 300,000 Arab-Americans in its Metro area, another 300,000 throughout Michigan, the city and state is the largest Arab-American community in the U.S. Dearborn is their cultural center in the region. Also in nearby Dearborn Heights.
- Montreal – includes North African (esp. Moroccans) immigrants, Lebanese and Syrians
- Orange County, California – 250,000 out of 500,000 Arab-Americans in Greater Los Angeles. Brookhurst Street in Anaheim is called "Little Arabia" or "Little Gaza" named for the Gaza Strip, as well West Bank of Anaheim named for the West Bank in the Occupied Palestinian Territories
- Ottawa – Canada's capital city has one of the largest Arab/middle eastern populations in Canada. One in ten Arabs in Canada live in Ottawa.
- San Diego, California metro area – eastern San Diego metro area - Little Baghdad in El Cajon and along El Cajon Boulevard in East San Diego and La Mesa, California)
- Oakland, California - etimated 10,000 Yemenis

=== Arabia ===
- Little Arabia, Anaheim, California

=== Armenia ===
- Little Armenia in Los Angeles, California
- Palm Desert, California
- Watertown, Massachusetts
- San Fernando Valley, California – largest population of the Armenian diaspora in the United States
- Fresno, California (Old Armenian Town off Ventura Blvd)
- Glendale, California (Armenian American cultural center) and nearby Atwater Village, Los Angeles. See also: Distribution of Armenians in Los Angeles county

=== Assyrians ===
- Sterling Heights, Michigan
- Orchard Lake Village, Michigan
- West Bloomfield Township, Michigan
- Chaldean Town (few remain in the area as of 2025)
- Turlock, California - Assyrians make up the majority of the Iranian diaspora in Turlock
- San Diego County, California
- Phoenix, Arizona
- Niles, Illinois
- Skokie, Illinois
- Worcester, Massachusetts
- Toronto, Canada
- Windsor, Ontario

=== Kurds ===
- Binghamton, New York
- Dallas, Texas and its metro area
- Houston, Texas.
- Los Angeles, California.
- Nashville, Tennessee (cultural center) – around 20,000 in the city
- Santa Barbara, California-Ventura County, California region in Southern California – may have the most Kurds in the U.S.
- Watertown, Massachusetts, suburb of Boston

=== Palestinian ===
- Little Palestine, South Paterson (Paterson, New Jersey)
- Bay Ridge, Brooklyn, New York City
- Astoria, Queens, New York City
- Northern San Mateo County, especially in the Daly City area, where Arab and Palestinian-owned businesses are abundant off of John Daly Blvd
- Foster City, California
- Bridgeview, Illinois and other parts of Chicagoland (such as Orland Park, Orland Hills, and Tinley Park)
- Alafaya, Florida
- Parts of Los Angeles County and Orange County, California (such as Little Arabia in Anaheim)
- Dearborn, Michigan
- Dearborn Heights, Michigan
- West San José in San José, California
- Corona, California
- Rancho Cucamonga, California
- Fremont, California
- Aurora, Colorado and other parts of Greater Denver
- Bedford, Texas
- Parts of Houston, Texas
- Diablo Valley in Contra Costa County, California
- Gallup, New Mexico
- Apple Mountain Lake, Virginia and other areas in Northern Virginia
- Columbus, Ohio
- North Olmsted, Ohio and other areas in Greater Cleveland
- Feltonville, Philadelphia, Pennsylvania
- Mississauga, Ontario
- Windsor, Ontario

=== Iran ===
- "Tehrangeles" Los Angeles – a portmanteau deriving from the combination of Tehran, the capital of Iran, and Los Angeles
- Irvine, California
- Houston, Texas
- Richmond Hill, Ontario
- Turlock, California – Mostly Iranian–Assyrians
- Beverly Hills, California
- Yonge Street in North York, Toronto, Ontario
- Baltimore, Maryland metropolitan area
- Seattle, Washington metropolitan area
- Greater Vancouver, British Columbia
- Great Neck, New York – Mostly Iranian Jews
- Anaheim Hills in Anaheim, California
- Dallas-Fort Worth metroplex in Texas
- Walnut Creek, California
- Santa Clara Valley in California
- Berkeley, California
- San Ramon, California
- San Antonio, Texas – large community of Iranian–Mandaeans
- Greater Austin, Texas
- Suburban San Diego, California
- South Orange County (especially Aliso Viejo, Lake Forest, and Laguna Niguel)
- Northern Virginia
- Glendale, California – many Iranian–Armenians
- Roseville, California
- Research Triangle, North Carolina

=== Yemen ===
- Little Yemen, The Bronx, New York City
- Lackawanna, New York
- Dearborn, Michigan
- West Oakland, Oakland, California
- Bay Ridge, Brooklyn, New York City
- Hamtramck, Michigan
- Inkster, Michigan

== Latin America and Caribbean ==
- Anaheim, California – 46% Mexican, large Salvadoran population, and Puerto Rican community and nearby West Anaheim, California in Orange County
- Excelsior District, San Francisco, California
- Miami-Dade County, Florida (Miami metro area has the largest Cuban population in the US with an estimate of 1 million Cuban-American residents with a large presence of Haitians, Jamaicans, Colombians, Brazilians, Nicaraguans, Puerto Ricans and Dominicans throughout the county)
- New York City – most Hispanics/Latinos of any US city, large Hispanic/Latino communities
- Providence, Rhode Island – The state itself has a large and growing Latino community. Large Presence of Dominican, Guatemalan, and Puerto Rican Community
- East Oakland, California
- North York, Toronto, Canada (Jane St. and Wilson Ave.) Growing Mexican, (Central American) Salvadoran, (South American) Colombian and Ecuadorean population concentrated in the city's northwest area
- Coachella, California
- Boston, Massachusetts – also Dominican and Puerto Rican sections - esp the South end

=== Guatemala ===
- The Kimmeytown neighborhood in Georgetown, Delaware
- Indigenous Mayan immigrants from Guatemala in north Georgia, especially in Cherokee County
- Canal District San Rafael, California
- Mission District, San Francisco
- Excelsior District, San Francisco
- Novato, California

=== El Salvador ===
Except Puerto Ricans (fourth as a nationality, second in ancestry among Hispanics and Latinos), Salvadorans are the second largest Hispanic/Latino ethnicity in the US, close to Dominicans who are third. Large Salvadoran communities developed in the late 20th–early 21st century period as a result of civil war, economic conditions, political turmoil and gang violence in the country, the country El Salvador is among the smallest in size in the Western Hemisphere. The largest Salvadoran population is in Central parts of Los Angeles and throughout California along with Central American groups like Guatemalans, Hondurans and Nicaraguans. Recent census data shows that for the first time, there are more Salvadorans living on Long Island than Puerto Ricans, with Salvadorans now numbering nearly 100,000, representing nearly a quarter of all Hispanics in the region, making them the largest Latino group in Long Island (New York State).

- Washington, D.C. (esp. Mount Pleasant), and nearby Maryland and Northern Virginia suburbs. Formerly known as Arlandria, a neighborhood between Alexandria and Arlington in Virginia is now referred to as Chirilagua, due to the many Salvadorans living there from that particular town.

=== Mexico ===
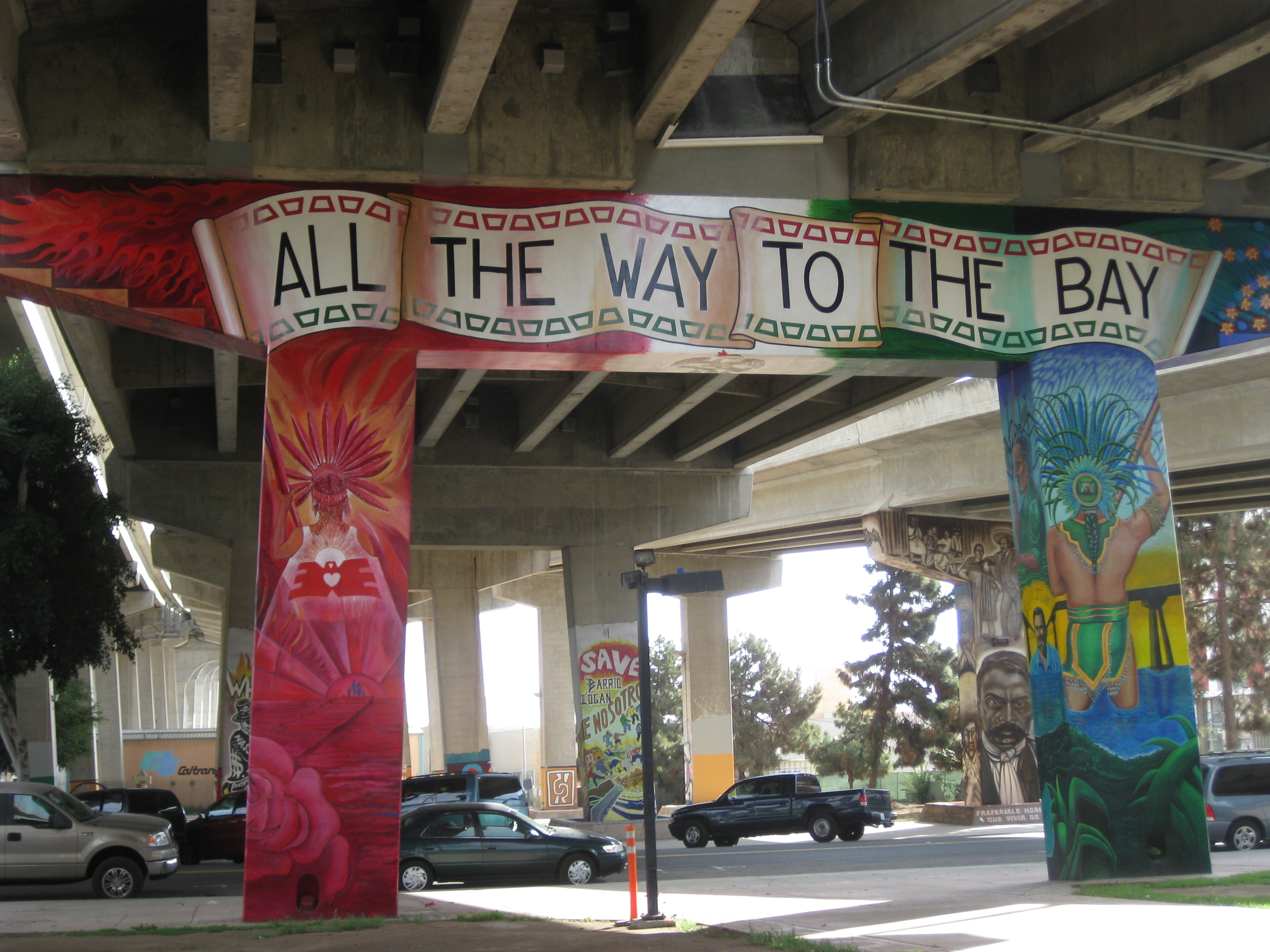
Mural in Chicano Park, San Diego stating "All the way to the Bay"

Note: Since immigrants from Mexico have been the largest group for a long time and have spread throughout the country perhaps more than any other nationality in recent times, Mexican-American enclaves are far more numerous than this list would suggest.

- Altus, Oklahoma
- Boyle Heights, Los Angeles, California (gentrifying)
- Downey, California – most affluent Mexican-American community
- Los Serranos, Chino Hills, California
- East Los Angeles, California – historic urban Mexican-American enclave See: Chicano
- San Bernardino, California
- Anaheim, California
- Calexico, California
- Santa Ana, California
- Central Corona, California
- Moreno Valley, California
- San Juan Capistrano, California
- Perris, California
- East Palo Alto, California
- Fontana, California
- Ontario, California
- Hemet, California
- Capital Hill, Oklahoma City
- Guymon, Oklahoma – in the Oklahoma Panhandle
- Cicero, Illinois and Little Village, Chicago; Chicagoland has one of largest Mexican populations
- Parts of Memphis and Nashville, Tennessee
- Raleigh, North Carolina – some areas
- Huntington Park, California
- Indio, California – over half Mexican, esp. from Michoacán.
- Logan Heights, San Diego, California (also known for Chicano Park)
- Oakland, Topeka, Kansas
- Jurupa Valley, California
- Redlands, California – Barrio Judeo or Negro (also had many Jews and African-Americans)
- Riverside, California – highest concentrations in the Eastside, Arlington, Casa Blanca, Northside, Arlanza, and Ramona neighborhoods.
- Whittier, California
- Monument Corridor and Ellis Lake in Concord, California
- Paramount, California
- High Desert (California)
- East and South Bakersfield, California
- Much of Santa Rosa, California
- East Oakland, Oakland, California, especially Fruitvale
- Wilmington, Los Angeles, California
- San Jose, California – Largest population in Eastside
- Mission District, San Francisco
- Much of Newark, California
- Decoto, Union City, California
- Cabrillo, 28 Palms, Sundale, and some parts of Irvington in Fremont, California
- North Fair Oaks, California
- Merced, California
- Northgate and Gardenland, Sacramento, California
- Fresno, California and nearby agricultural communities
- Modesto, California
- Parts of Stockton, California
- Pittsburg, California
- Salinas, California
- Watsonville, California
- El Paso, Texas
- Laredo, Texas
- Rio Grande Valley in Texas and the broader South Texas region
- South Dallas, Dallas, Texas
- Much of Irving, Texas
- Mid-Cities, Texas
- Houston, Texas and its eastern/southern suburbs
- Parts of Austin, Texas
- South Albuquerque, New Mexico and much of East Albuquerque and parts of North and West Albuquerque
- Las Cruces, New Mexico
- Parts of Florida such as Immokalee
- Tri-Cities, Washington
- Mexicantown, Detroit
- South Milwaukee, WI
- North Charleston, South Carolina
- Reno and North Las Vegas, Nevada
- Denver, Colorado and Aurora, Sherrelwood, and Lakewood
- Greeley, Colorado
- Cortez, Colorado and Pueblo, Colorado
- Corona, Queens, New York; Spanish Harlem, Manhattan; parts of Long Island, New York
- Reading, Pennsylvania
- Des Moines, Iowa; Perry, Iowa; some parts of rural Iowa as well, like West Liberty, Iowa and Storm Lake, Iowa
- Delavan, Wisconsin; parts of Racine, WI and Beloit, WI
- St. Paul, Minnesota - some areas
- Fort Wayne, Indiana/Gary, Indiana/parts of Indianapolis
- San Antonio/Uvalde, Texas areas
- Bonanza, Oregon; Nyssa, Oregon; Salem, Oregon and parts of the Portland metropolitan area
- West Valley City, Utah
- Boise, Idaho – some areas
- Little Rock, Arkansas – some areas
- Metairie, Louisiana
- Cumming, Georgia and parts of rural Georgia; some of metro Atlanta
- Leamington Ontario

=== West Indies and Caribbean ===
- Blue Hills, Connecticut (23.9% Jamaican, highest Jamaican population in the U.S.)
- Little Haiti, Miami
- Little Havana, Miami
- Divina Providencia, Tijuana, Baja California – known as Pequeña Haití
- The Triangle, North Carolina (Cuban, as well Puerto Rican and increasingly Mexican neighborhoods)
- Louisville, Kentucky (Cuban – especially in Okolona (40219 with over 10%,) the 40213 zip code, and to a much lesser extent 40214)
- Westchester, Florida (65.69% Cuban, highest Cuban population in the U.S.)
- Westside Simi Valley, California – some Puerto Rican, but more Mexican section of largely Anglo city

== Pacific Islands and Oceania ==
Including Native Hawaiians or Kanaka Maoli in the mainland US, esp the west coast states of CA, NV, OR and WA.

=== Samoa ===
- Honolulu, Hawaii
- American Samoa
- Long Beach, California
- Salt Lake City, Utah

=== Tonga ===
- Honolulu, Hawaii
- American Samoa
- Meadowview, Sacramento, California
- Los Angeles, California
- Salt Lake City, Utah
- East Palo Alto, California

=== Marshall Islands ===
- Springdale, Arkansas
- Tigard, Oregon

=== Fiji ===
- San Bruno, California
- Hayward, California
- Bennett Valley, Santa Rosa, California

=== Micronesia ===
- Honolulu, Hawaii

=== Guam and the Northern Mariana Islands (Chamorro and Carolinians) ===
- Honolulu, Hawaii
- Las Vegas, Nevada

== Others ==
=== Jews (of many nationalities) ===
- Jewtown, Port Richmond, Staten Island, NYC
- Kiryas Joel, New York near Monroe, New York – homogeneously Hasidic Jewish private housing tract. Similar communities Kiryas Square, New York and New Square, New York
- Lakewood, New Jersey – Large Orthodox Jewish community, and one of US' largest populations of Hasidim
- Lombard Street (Baltimore) (Jewtown, Baltimore) – also was an Italian neighborhood
- Los Angeles (San Fernando Valley, etc.)
- Lower East Side, Manhattan, New York City (historic) – NYC has the world's largest Jewish community outside Israel (10–20% of Jewish faith or descent, or 1.1 million – 1.5 million observant Jews)
- Petaluma, California

=== Native Americans ===
- Urban Indians, communities developed by small enclaves of Native Americans/First Nations and Alaskan Natives since the 1930s. They tend to form small percentages of the urban areas' population. Virtually every major city in the US has an American Indian community. See Rancherie/ Ranchería for urban Indian parts of Las Vegas, Nevada and Reno, Nevada. Urban Indian reserves in Canada have also been located within Canadian cities.

The highest concentration of urban Indians in the United States is believed to be in Anchorage, Alaska where over 10 percent of the population identify themselves in the census as having some Native ancestry, with 7.3 percent identifying that as their only ancestry. In the mainland USA, Indian Alley in downtown Los Angeles, California, may be the most dense Native American population of any major city.

The second highest concentration of urban Indians in the U.S. is Albuquerque, New Mexico where at least 5 percent of the population belong to recognized Native American tribes such as the Navajo, Apache and Pueblo (Keresan, Tiwa, Tewa, Towa, Zuni). Southeast Albuquerque has the largest Native American community in the city but Native communities can also be found on the Westside and Rio Rancho. Albuquerque also has a Cherokee diaspora community known as the Cherokee Southwest Township. A much larger percentage of the population possess some Native ancestry but identity as Hispanos, Mestizos or Genizaros. This population lives all over the Albuquerque metro area but is concentrated in the South Valley and Bernalillo.

Winnipeg, Manitoba has the largest indigenous population of any major city in Canada both in terms of percentage (12.2 percent) and total number. Other Canadian cities with significant First Nations populations include Prince George, British Columbia and Saskatoon, Saskatchewan.

- San Francisco Bay Area – The US' largest, mainly in Oakland
- Phoenix, Arizona near the Gila and Salt Rivers tribes and reservations.
- Oklahoma City
- Tulsa, Oklahoma
- Minneapolis-Saint Paul, Minnesota

Smaller off-reservation cities and towns with significant Native American populations include:

- Tahlequah, Oklahoma in the Cherokee Nation
- Anadarko, Oklahoma – see Indian City USA
- Lawton, Oklahoma
- Gallup, New Mexico
- Farmington, New Mexico
- Grants, New Mexico
- Flagstaff, Arizona
- Tucson, Arizona
- Holbrook, Arizona
- Winslow, Arizona
- Page, Arizona
- Billings, Montana
- Rapid City, South Dakota
- Madras, Oregon
- Pendleton, Oregon
- Spokane, Washington
- Fairbanks, Alaska
- Nome, Alaska
- Blanding, Utah
- Rolla, North Dakota
- Palm Springs, California
- Pawhuska, Oklahoma
- Historic Spanish Fork Indian Farm reservation, a former 20-square-mile reservation bordered by the towns of Spanish Fork (East), Payson (South), Santaquin (West), and the shore of Utah Lake (North) for the Ute people/

== Historic ==
=== Asia ===
- Chinatown, San Diego, California
- Chinatown, San Jose, California
- Chinatown, Denver, Colorado
- Chinatown Portland, Maine
- Chinatown, Newark, New Jersey
- Chinatown, New Orleans, Louisiana
- Chinatown, Virginia City, Nevada
- First Chinatown, Toronto, Ontario
- Old Chinatown, Los Angeles

== See also ==
- Multiculturalism
- Block settlement, in Canada, a rural equivalent to an urban ethnic neighborhood
- Demographics of California
- Demographics of Los Angeles
- Indian colony, an urban reservation in the United States
- New York City ethnic enclaves
- Urban Indian reserve in Canada
