= News media endorsements in the 2020 United States presidential primaries =

Newspapers and other news media in the United States traditionally endorse candidates for party nomination for president of the United States, and later endorse one of the ultimate nominees for president. Below is a list of notable endorsements in 2020, by candidate, for each primary race.

== Democrats ==
=== Nominee ===
==== Joe Biden ====
Publication	State	Endorsement date	Ref.
Sioux City Journal	Iowa	January 25, 2020	
Las Vegas Weekly (co-endorsement with Klobuchar)	Nevada	February 13, 2020	
Las Vegas Sun (co-endorsement with Klobuchar)	Nevada	February 14, 2020	
The San Diego Union-Tribune	California	March 2, 2020	
Detroit News	Michigan	March 2, 2020	
Detroit Free Press	Michigan	March 5, 2020	
Tampa Bay Times (St. Petersburg)	Florida	March 5, 2020	
Chicago Sun-Times	Illinois	March 6, 2020	
Palm Beach Post	Florida	March 6, 2020	
Northwest Herald (Crystal Lake)	Illinois	March 7, 2020	
Sun-Sentinel (Fort Lauderdale)	Florida	March 7, 2020	
The Herald (Everett)	Washington	March 8, 2020	
The Chicago Crusader	Illinois	March 13, 2020	

=== Withdrawn candidates ===
==== Michael Bloomberg ====
Publication	State	Endorsement date	Ref.
TimesDaily (Florence)	Alabama	February 26, 2020	
The Charlotte Post	North Carolina	February 26, 2020	
Boston Herald	Massachusetts	March 2, 2020	
The Lowell Sun	Massachusetts	March 2, 2020	
Sentinel & Enterprise (Fitchburg)	Massachusetts	March 2, 2020	

==== Pete Buttigieg ====
Publication	State	Endorsement date	Ref.
The San Diego Union-Tribune	California	February 20, 2020	
The State (Columbia)	South Carolina	February 24, 2020	
El Paso Times	Texas	February 25, 2020	
Orlando Sentinel	Florida	February 28, 2020	

==== Amy Klobuchar ====
Publication	State	Endorsement date	Ref.
Quad-City Times (Davenport)	Iowa	January 19, 2020	
The New York Times (co-endorsement with Warren)	New York	January 19, 2020	
New Hampshire Union Leader (Manchester)	New Hampshire	January 25, 2020	
Keene Sentinel	New Hampshire	January 27, 2020	
Iowa City Press-Citizen	Iowa	January 31, 2020	
Foster's Daily Democrat (Dover)	New Hampshire	January 31, 2020	
Las Vegas Weekly (co-endorsement with Biden)	Nevada	February 13, 2020	
Las Vegas Sun (co-endorsement with Biden)	Nevada	February 14, 2020	
The Mercury News (San Jose)	California	February 14, 2020	
Houston Chronicle	Texas	February 16, 2020	
The San Francisco Chronicle	California	February 21, 2020	
The Seattle Times	Washington	February 21, 2020	
Bangor Daily News	Maine	February 27, 2020	
The Star Tribune (Minneapolis)	Minnesota	February 29, 2020	

==== Bernie Sanders ====
Publication	State	Endorsement date	Ref.
The Chicago Maroon (University of Chicago)	Illinois	January 24, 2020	
The Daily Iowan (University of Iowa)	Iowa	January 29, 2020	
The Daily Pennsylvanian (University of Pennsylvania)	Pennsylvania	February 2, 2020	
The Conway Daily Sun	New Hampshire	February 4, 2020	
San Francisco Bay Guardian	California	February 10, 2020	
The Valley Advocate (Northampton)	Massachusetts	February 12, 2020	
The Times-Standard (Eureka)	California	February 23, 2020	
The Michigan Daily (University of Michigan)	Michigan	February 23, 2020	
The Stranger (Seattle)	Washington	February 26, 2020	
Yemeni American News (Dearborn)	Michigan	February 26, 2020	
Daily Hampshire Gazette (Northampton)	Massachusetts	February 27, 2020	
The Columbia Chronicle (Columbia College Chicago)	Illinois	February 29, 2020	
The Nation	New York	March 2, 2020	
Metro Times (Detroit)	Michigan	March 4, 2020	
Maui Time Weekly	Hawaii	March 4, 2020	
Creative Loafing Tampa Bay	Florida	March 6, 2020	
The Arab American News (Dearborn)	Michigan	March 8, 2020	

==== Elizabeth Warren ====
Publication	State	Endorsement date	Ref.
The Storm Lake Times	Iowa	December 11, 2019	
The New York Times (co-endorsement with Klobuchar)	New York	January 19, 2020	
Des Moines Register	Iowa	January 25, 2020	
The Austin Chronicle	Texas	February 14, 2020	
The Boston Globe	Massachusetts	February 26, 2020	
The Daily Bruin (University of California, Los Angeles)	California	March 2, 2020	

==== Andrew Yang ====
Publication	State	Endorsement date	Ref.
The Lowell Sun	Massachusetts	January 27, 2020	
Sentinel & Enterprise (Fitchburg)	Massachusetts	January 27, 2020	

== Republicans ==
=== Nominee ===
==== Donald Trump ====
Publication	State	Endorsement date	Ref.
El Paso Times	Texas	March 1, 2020	
Boston Herald	Massachusetts	March 2, 2020	

=== Withdrawn candidate ===
==== Bill Weld ====
Publication	State	Endorsement date	Ref.
The Boston Globe	Massachusetts	February 26, 2020	
The Republican (Springfield)	Massachusetts	March 1, 2020	
