= Chinese Cubans =

Cubans whose ancestry originated in China

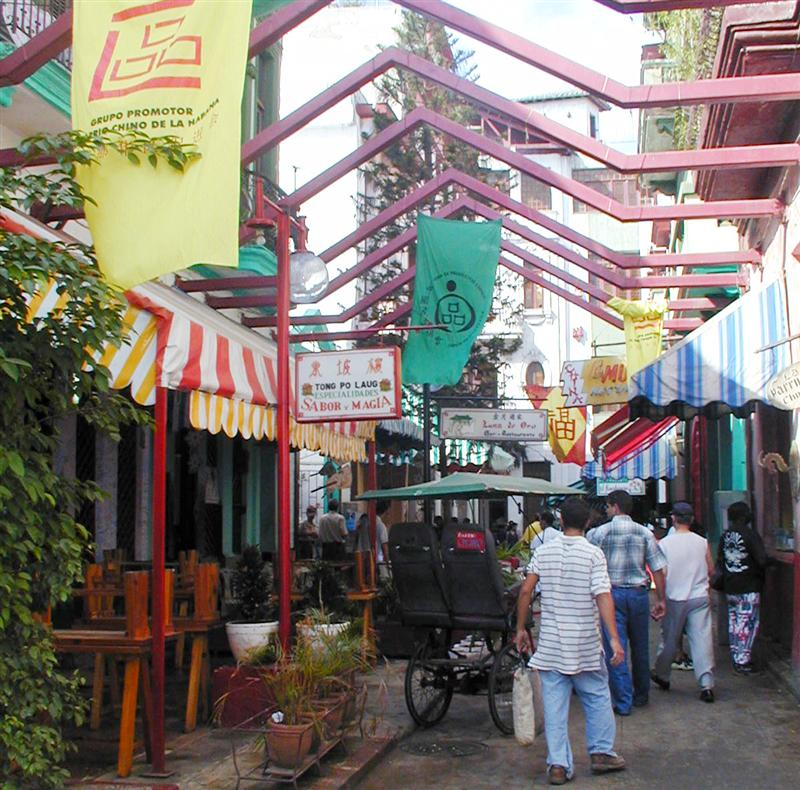
- Cuchillo street, the heart of Havana's Chinatown

Total population
- 150 (114,000 mixed ancestry)

Regions with significant populations
- Havana

Languages
- Cuban Spanish · Chinese

Religion
- Buddhism · Taoism · Roman Catholicism

Related ethnic groups
- Chinese Caribbeans, Chinese Peruvians, Chinese Brazilians, Overseas Chinese

Chinese Cubans
- Traditional Chinese: 古巴華人
- Simplified Chinese: 古巴华人
Transcriptions
Standard Mandarin
- Hanyu Pinyin: Gǔbā Huárén
Yue: Cantonese
- Yale Romanization: Gúbā Wàyàn

Alternative Chinese name
- Traditional Chinese: 古巴華僑
- Simplified Chinese: 古巴华侨
Transcriptions
Standard Mandarin
- Hanyu Pinyin: Gǔbā Huáqiáo
Yue: Cantonese
- Yale Romanization: Gúbā Wàkìu

Chinese Cubans (Spanish: chino-cubano) are Cubans of full or mixed Chinese ancestry who were born in or have immigrated to Cuba. They are part of the ethnic Chinese diaspora (or Overseas Chinese). The population peaked to around 60,000 in the 1950s, but almost entirely disappeared in the aftermath of the 1959 Cuban Revolution, with the population largely disappearing to Miami, Florida, or elsewhere in Latin America.

== History ==
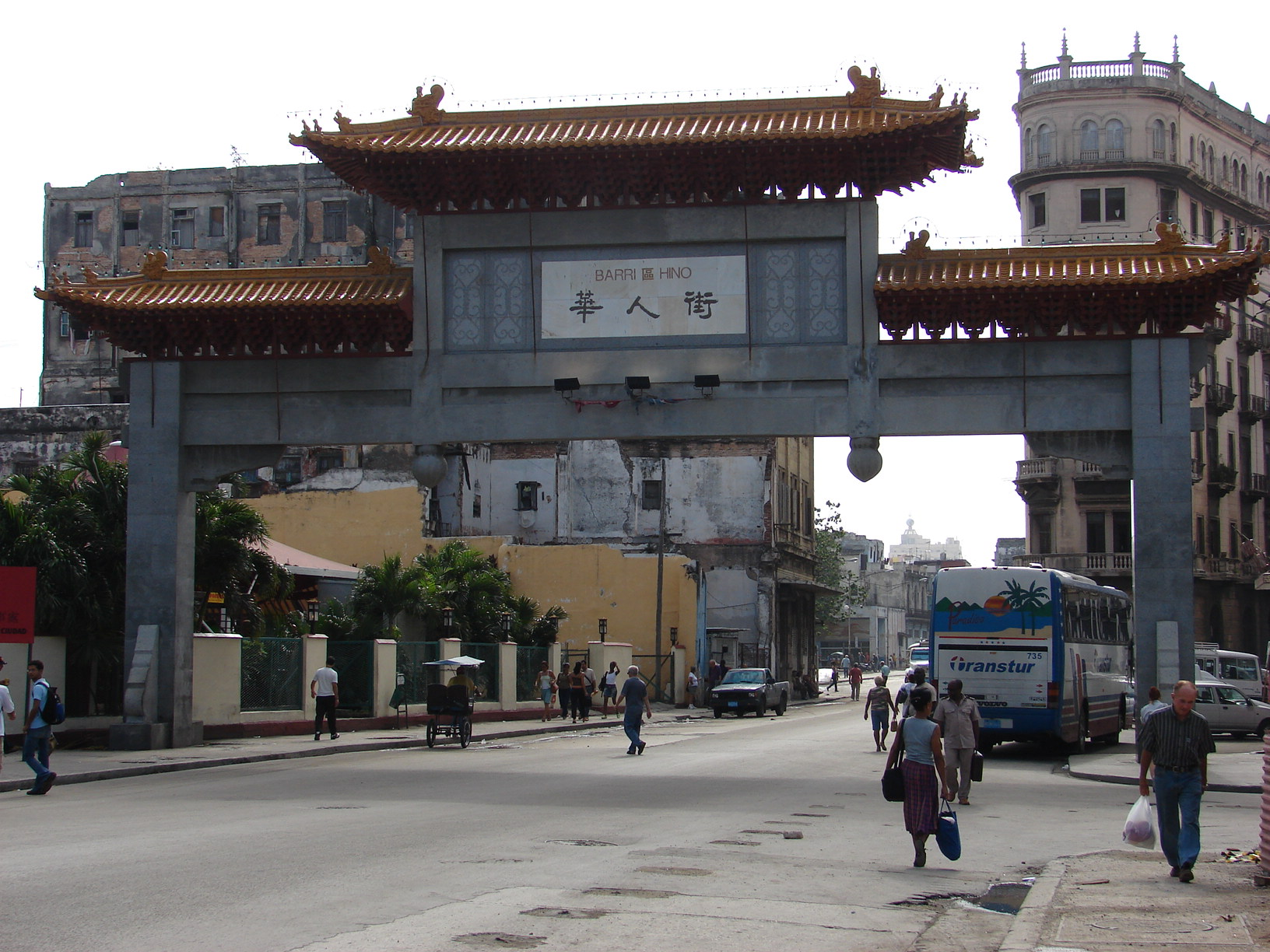
The paifang at the entrance of Havana's Chinatown

Chinese immigration to Cuba started in 1837 when Chinese (mainly Cantonese and Hakka) contract workers were forcibly brought to work in the sugar fields via the indentured labor system. Hundreds of thousands of Chinese workers were brought in from Qing China, British Hong Kong, Portuguese Macau, and Taiwan during the following decades to replace and/or work alongside African and mixed-ancestry slaves. With the worldwide success of the abolitionist movement, Cuban plantation owners no longer saw African slavery as a sustainable source of labor for plantations, prompting them to seek Chinese migrants as indentured laborers. Over the period 1847–1874, 141,000 Chinese workers migrated to Cuba.

After completing eight-year contracts or otherwise obtaining their freedom, some Chinese immigrants settled permanently in Cuba, although most longed for repatriation to their homeland. Havana's Chinatown (known as Havana Chinatown) is one of the oldest and largest Chinatowns in Latin America. Some 105,000 immigrants from the U.S. came to Cuba during the late 19th century to escape the discrimination present at the time. Another, albeit smaller wave of Chinese immigrants, also arrived during the 20th century, some as supporters of the communist cause during the Cuban revolution and others as dissidents escaping the authorities in China.

There were almost no women among the nearly entirely male Chinese "coolie" population that migrated to Cuba (1%). Marriages of Chinese immigrants with Cuban mulatto, black and white women were reported by the Cuba Commission Report.

In the 1920s, an additional 30,000 Cantonese and small groups of Japanese also arrived; both immigrations were exclusively male and there was rapid intermarriage with white, black and mulatto populations.

In a study of genetic origins, admixture, and asymmetry in maternal and paternal human lineages in Cuba, thirty-five Y-chromosome SNPs were typed in the 132 male individuals of the Cuban sample. The study does not include any people with known Chinese ancestry. All the samples were white Cubans and black Cubans. Two out of 132 male samples belonged to East Asian haplogroup O2, which is found in significant frequencies among Cantonese people and is found in 1.5% of the Cuban population. In the 1920s, an additional 30,000 Chinese arrived; the immigrants were exclusively male. In 1980, 4000 Chinese lived there, but by 2002, only 300 pure Chinese were left.

Two thousand Chinese, consisting of Cantonese and Hakkas, fought with the rebels in Cuba's Ten Years' War. A monument in Havana honours the Cuban Chinese who fell in the war, on which is inscribed: "There was not one Cuban Chinese deserter, not one Cuban Chinese traitor."

Chinese Cubans, including some Chinese Americans from California, joined the Spanish–American War in 1898 to achieve independence from Spain, but a few Chinese, who were loyal to Spain, left Cuba and went to Spain. Racial acceptance and assimilation would come much later.

When the new revolutionary government led by Fidel Castro came to power in 1959, the economic and political situation changed. Many Chinese business owners, having had their properties expropriated by the new government, left Cuba. Most of these settled in the United States, particularly nearby Florida, where they and their U.S.-born children are called Chinese Americans or Cuban Americans of Chinese descent, while a relatively few fled to the nearby Dominican Republic and other Latin American countries and also to the U.S. territory of Puerto Rico. As a result of this exodus, the number of pure Chinese dropped sharply in Havana's Barrio Chino. The places to which they migrated had a unique Chinese culture and a popularity of Chinese Cuban restaurants.

== Current distribution ==
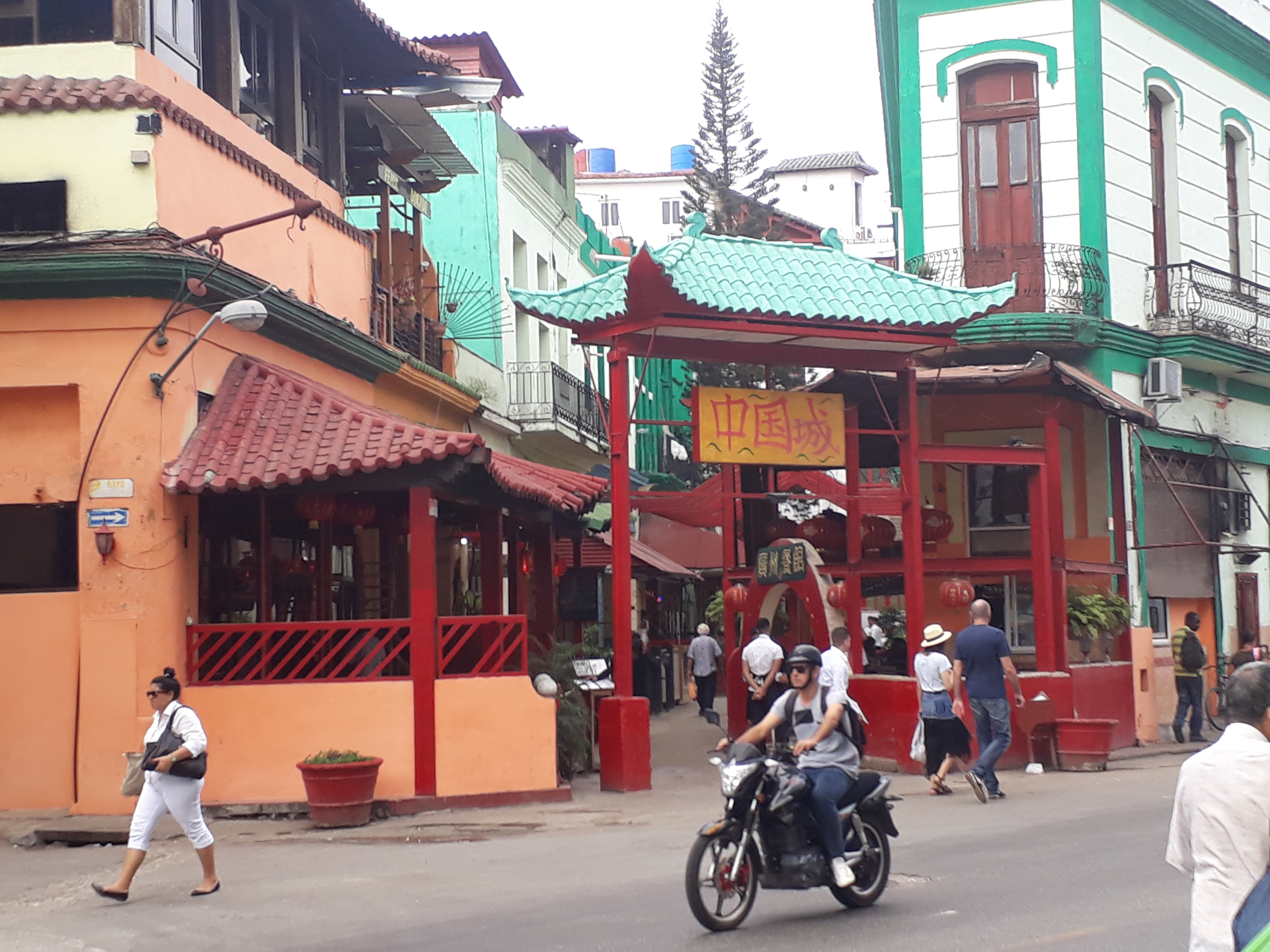
Chinese restaurants in Havana's Chinatown

From a peak population of 60,000 in the 1950s, the Chinese Cuban population has virtually disappeared following the Cuban Revolution in 1959. The majority of Chinese Cubans fled to the United States, in particular to Miami, Florida, but some also settled in California or elsewhere in Latin America.

Of the Chinese who stayed after the start of Fidel Castro's rule in 1961, the vast majority were of mixed descent with the local population. Today, younger generations are working in a wider variety of jobs than the previous generation including medicine, engineering, and law.

Once among the largest Chinatowns in Latin America, the Barrio Chino de La Habana is now the world's smallest and is primarily concentrated in a small alleyway dominated by Chinese restaurants. Most Chinese Cubans live outside Barrio Chino.

Several community groups, especially Chinatown Promotional Group (Spanish: Grupo Promotor del Barrio Chino), worked to revive Barrio Chino and the faded Chinese culture. Chinese Language and Arts School (Escuela de la Lengua y Artes China) opened in 1993 and has grown since then, helping Chinese Cubans to strengthen their knowledge of the Chinese language. Today, Chinese Cubans tend to speak Mandarin, Cantonese, and Hakka in addition to Spanish and English and may speak in a mixture of Chinese and Spanish. They also promoted small businesses, like beauty parlors, mechanical shops, restaurants and small groceries, provided to them to create a view of Barrio Chino. Havana's Barrio Chino also experienced buildings of Chinese architecture and museum with backgrounds about China. As a result, the Chinese Cuban community has gained visibility.

== In literature and popular culture ==
- The influence of the Chinese migration to Cuba is thoroughly reflected in the novel The Island of Eternal Love by Cuban American author Daína Chaviano. Originally published in Spain as La isla de los amores infinitos, it has been translated into 25 languages. The plot covers 150 years, from the 1840s through the 1990s.
- A Cuban Chinese family engaged in international intrigue appears in William Gibson's Spook Country (2007).
- In the 2006 film Miami Vice, Gong Li portrays Isabella, a Chinese Cuban woman.

== Notable Chinese Cubans ==
- Wifredo Lam (1902–1982), painter of the Surrealist school
- Alfredo Abon Lee (1927–2012), army officer who commanded government troops during the Battle of Yaguajay
- Yat-Sen Chang (born 1971), ballet dancer
- Maikel Chang (born 1991), professional association football player
- Ching Ho Cheng (1946-1989), visual artist

== See also ==
- Asian Hispanic and Latino Americans
- Asian Latin Americans
- China–Cuba relations
- Chinatowns in Latin America
- Chinese Caribbeans
- Cubans
- Overseas Chinese
