= Yemeni Americans =

Americans of Yemeni birth or ancestry

Yemeni-American أمريكيون يمنيون
Total population
- 2020 US Census: 91,288 Yemeni-born, 2023; 71,471

Regions with significant populations
- New York, Michigan, Virginia, Illinois, California

Languages
- Arabic • English

Related ethnic groups
- Arab Americans • Yemenis in the United Kingdom

Yemeni Americans are Americans of Yemeni ancestry. According to an estimate in 2020, more than 90,000 Yemenis live in the United States.

== History ==
Although it is unknown when Yemenis first arrived, it is believed that Yemenis were immigrating to the U.S. after 1869, and are recorded in the 1890s. Some Yemenis gained U.S. citizenship by fighting in World War I and World War II. Yemeni immigrants settled in existing Lebanese communities in cities like New York. They were outcast as Muslims, as the Lebanese communities were predominantly Christian, as were Syrian and Palestinian communities. After becoming situated, many Yemenis traveled westward for better job opportunities. In many places of United States, such as Chicago, Brooklyn (New York), and South Dearborn (Michigan), the first Yemeni entrepreneurs were owners of cafes and delis (a well-known example being internet personality Khalid Attaf). However, these companies are not characteristic of Yemeni culture, and it is likely that they have been owners of cafes under the influence of Lebanese and Palestinian communities longer. Many Yemeni-Americans also worked in factories in the Rust Belt of the upper Northeast and Midwest. During the Great Depression of 1929 and until 1945, end of World War II, Yemeni immigration to United States slowed dramatically. Immigration then increased afterward. When in 1965 the quota system for immigration was eliminated, Yemenis could more easily gain visas to reside in and gain employment in the United States. This prompted a great increase in the numbers of Yemeni immigrants. Another feature of Yemeni immigrants in the U.S. is that in the years of immigration that occurred to 1970, nearly all immigrants from Yemen were adult males.

== Demography ==
Although the overwhelming majority of Yemeni Americans are Muslim, there are also some American Jews of Yemeni ancestry, mostly whose parents or ancestors came to the U.S. via Israel. Significant Yemeni communities exist in The Bronx, New York (especially around Van Nest in an enclave called Little Yemen); Brooklyn, New York; the Buffalo metropolitan area (especially in Lackawanna, New York); Dearborn, Michigan; Hamtramck, Michigan; Falls Church, Virginia; Chicago, Illinois; Bakersfield, California; Oakland, California; and Fresno, California. Over 30,000 Yemeni Americans live in Michigan. A significant population of Yemeni Americans live in the southside of Dearborn (Salina area). A few Yemenis had arrived in Michigan around 1900 but a much larger group came to work in the Ford Motor Company's Rouge Plant in the 1920s. Immigration to Michigan is still occurring. A survey of Arab Americans in the Detroit area after 9/11 found that Yemenis made up 9% of the area's Arab population and that Yemenis had the largest families, the lowest rate of business ownership (3% compared to 20% for other Arab groups), and a high rate of employment in "trades" as opposed to services, administration, professional or sales (43 percent in trades compared to 7 to 17 percent for other Arabs groups). Anthropologist Loukia K. Sarroub while investigating the Dearborn Yemeni culture through the perspective of 6 high-school age girls noted that the community was a "'Yemeni village' in the United States" where "this community continued to live much as they did in Yemen".

Sally Howell, author of Howell, "Competing for Muslims: New Strategies for Urban Renewal in Detroit", wrote that Yemeni people had a presence in the Metro Detroit area since the late 1960s and "they have participated more actively in transnational practices than have other Arab Americans".

== Language and religion ==
Yemeni Americans speak both English and Arabic. They speak many different dialects of Arabic, including: Sanaani or Northern Yemeni dialect, Ta'izzi-Adeni or Southern Yemeni dialect, Hadrami dialect, Mehri dialect, and Judeo-Yemeni dialect. Most of them are Muslim, though some are also Jewish.

== Politics ==
Yemeni Americans have supported the Democratic Party in recent elections. Majority of the community backed Hillary Clinton in the 2016 presidential election and Joe Biden in the 2020 presidential election. In recent years, Yemeni Americans have become more politically active and have increasingly run for political offices. Several Yemeni American politicians have won local and state elections.

== Media and organizations ==
The Yemeni American Net was established in June 2007 as a web-site dedicated to bring a view to the world on the Yemeni Americans. One year later, a newspaper was established as the Yemeni American News. The American Association of Yemeni Scientists and Professionals promotes Yemenis in technical fields and provides a college scholarship program. The Yemeni American Association and the Yemeni American Benevolent Association also provide scholarships.

The Yemenite Jewish Federation of America was founded in 1995. American Yemeni Jews took an active role in rescuing European Jews during the holocaust.

== Notable people ==
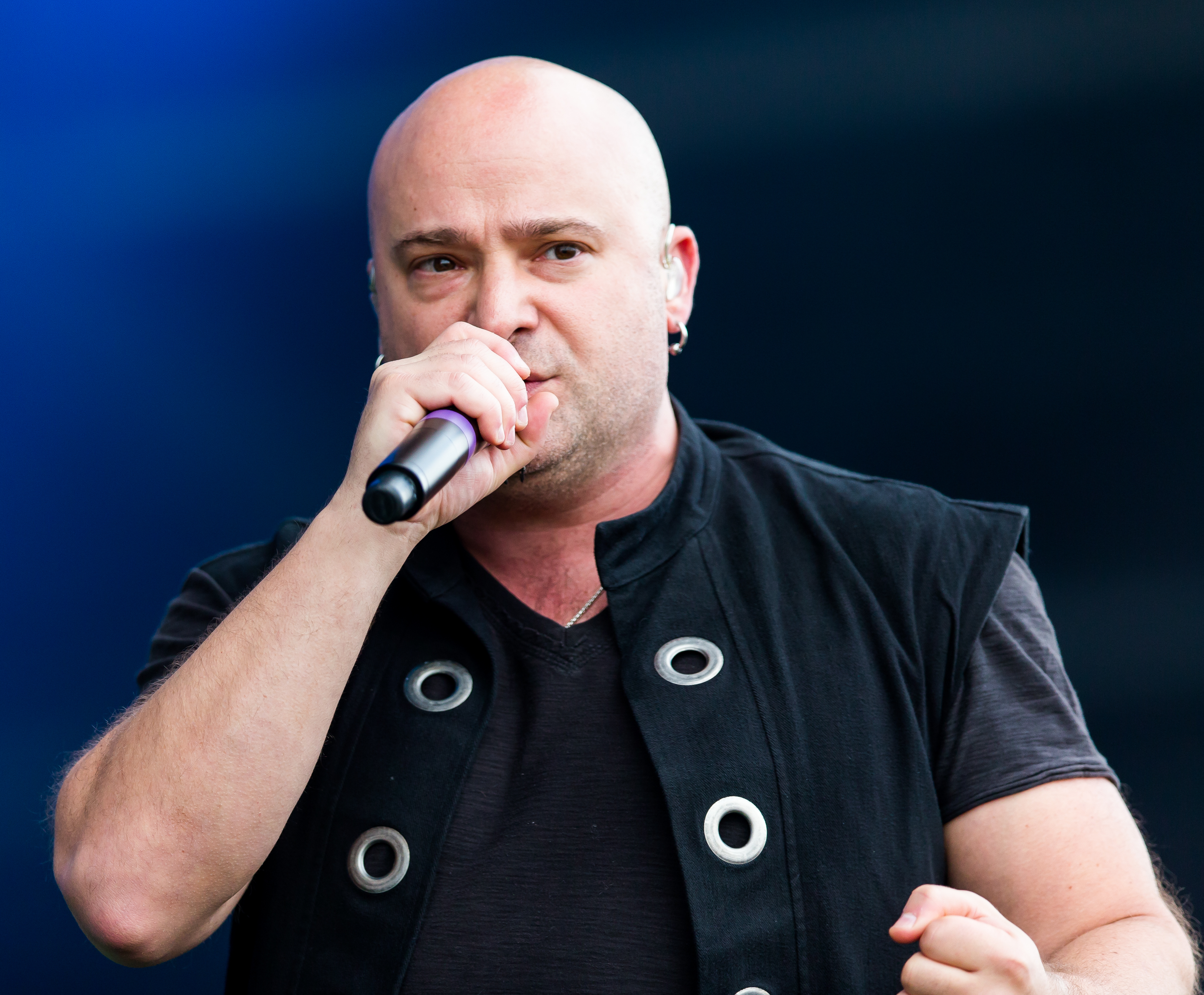
David Draiman

- Abraham Aiyash (born 1994), Majority Leader Michigan House of Representatives
- Sadam Ali (born 1988), boxer
- Hakim Almasmari, journalist
- Sharifa Alkhateeb, writer and teacher
- Assaf Cohen (born 1972), actor
- Ze'eva Cohen (born 1940), dancer and modern/postmodern dance choreographer
- David Draiman (born 1973), heavy metal singer
- Amer Ghalib, politician
- Isra Girgrah, Yemeni-born American professional world champion female boxer
- Gil Ozeri, comedian, actor, and writer
- Adam Saleh (born 1993), YouTuber and musician
- Ari'el Stachel (born 1991), actor

== See also ==
- Demographics of Yemen
- Yemeni Canadians
- Yemeni British
- United States–Yemen relations

== Notes ==
- Yemeni American Net
