= Yemeni Canadians =

Total population
- 8,115 (2021 Canada Census)

Regions with significant populations
- Toronto, Ottawa, Vancouver, Montreal

Languages
- Arabic (Yemeni Arabic), English and French

Religion
- Islam

Yemeni Canadians are Canadians of Partial or full Yemeni descent or Yemenis who have Canadian citizenship.

== Demography ==
=== Population ===
According to the 2016 Census there were 6,645 Canadians who claimed Yemeni ancestry.

=== Language ===
Most Yemeni Canadians speak Arabic, English or French.

=== Religion ===
Yemeni Canadian demography by religion
Religious group	2021 (Note: Religious breakdown proportions based on "Yemeni" ethnic or cultural origin response on the 2021 census.)	
Religious group	Pop.	%
Islam	6,800	83.74%
Judaism	575	7.08%
Irreligion	545	6.71%
Christianity	155	1.91%
Buddhism	10	0.12%
Hinduism	10	0.12%
Other	25	0.31%
Total Yemeni Canadian population	8,120	100%

== See also ==
- Arab Canadians
- Yemeni Americans
