= American Indian Exposition =

Coordinates: 35°04′32″N 98°13′49″W

The American Indian Exposition, held annually during the first full week in August at the Caddo County Fairgrounds in Anadarko, Oklahoma, is one of the oldest and largest intertribal gatherings in the United States. Sponsored by fifteen tribes (Apache, Arapaho, Caddo, Cheyenne, Comanche, Delaware, Fort Sill Apache, Iowa, Kiowa, Osage, Otoe-Missouri, Pawnee, Ponca, Sac & Fox, and Wichita), representatives from up to fifty other tribes participate in any given year.

== History ==
The Exposition began with the All-Indian Fair first held in 1924. It was the successor to the Craterville Park Indian Fair, which had been held from 1924 through 1933 near Cache, Oklahoma. A group of people calling themselves the Southwest Indian Fair (SWIF) had met after the Caddo County Free Fair in 1935 to discuss their dissatisfaction with the Craterville Park demonstrations of Indian culture, which they felt was too ethnocentric and white-oriented. They felt that the Indian participants were treated as merely figureheads. The leaders of SWIF wanted to separate the dance performances from the county fair, and wanted the Caddo County Free Fair board to give them creative and management freedom over the production. In 1935 it was incorporated as the American Indian Exposition with the stated purpose of "promoting and retaining Indian cultural life, handicrafts, arts, crafts, and farming a seend livestock skills by providing a yearly showcase".

The Exposition features a week-long program of dance contests, parades, pageants (Indian Princess, Beautiful Baby), sporting events such as softball as well as arts and crafts contests. The fairgrounds also provides camping accommodations for the participants. Nearby is the Southern Plains Indian Museum, the American Indian Hall of Fame, and Indian City USA.

No expositions were held in 1942-45 nor 2020-21.

== Miss American Indian Exposition ==
The title "Miss American Indian Exposition," came into existence in the 1930s, when a young woman, Imogene Carter, was selected to represent the AIE. The event has been reintroduced many times, and the requirements have undergone several changes. In 2015, the AIE Board retired the title until it could reassess the qualifications and other requirements. In January, 2016, AIE reinstated this aspect of the program. It opened competition to any young American Indian woman who wished to enter. Previously, competition was limited to actual tribal princesses. To promote education, the title holder would be expected to serve as a mentor for young women, and the winner each year would receive a scholarship. The winner of the 2016 competition is Marquela Pewewardy, who is 17 years old and whose mother is Kiowa and whose father is Comanche. (Note: Her Comanche name, Nuh-nuh-tsi, means "precious girl" in English.)She plans to enroll in Oklahoma University, when she graduates from Elgin High School.
