= Indian City USA =

Coordinates: 35°02′15″N 98°13′33″W

The Indian City USA Cultural Center, formerly known as Indian City USA, was an outdoor museum in Anadarko, Oklahoma.

The center included reconstructions of American Indian houses and way of life in the United States. The Department of Anthropology from the University of Oklahoma supervised the construction of the housing units. Reconstructed dwellings represent many of the tribes from the Southwest and Southern Plains, including Caddo, Southern Cheyenne, Wichita, Pawnee, Navajo, and Apache.

The citizens of Anadarko founded the museum in 1954. The museum is located on the site of a massacre of the Tonkawa Indians during American Civil War by Shawnees and other tribes. The land was formerly occupied by the Kiowa, Apache, and Comanche Reservation.

In addition to the outdoor displays, Indian City USA offered guided tours, Native dancing, Native American arts and crafts, and the Indian City Museum. It is near the location of the Southern Plains Indian Museum, the American Indian Hall of Fame, and the annual American Indian Exposition,.

The museum is currently owned by the Kiowa Tribe of Oklahoma.

According to the Leisure and Sports Review (LASR), the museum is closed. No website for the museum can be found.
