= Chinatown, Salt Lake City =

Salt Lake City Chinatown
- Neighborhood
- Men lounging outside saloon & Chinese laundry, Salt Lake City, 1910
- Interactive map of Salt Lake City Chinatown
- Coordinates: 40°45′0″N 111°53′0″W
- Country: United States
- State: Utah
- City: Salt Lake City

Historically, the city of Salt Lake City, Utah, had a Chinatown that was located in a section called "Plum Alley" that contained a Chinese population that worked in the mining camps and the transcontinental railroad. The first Chinese peoples came in the 1860s and had formed a historical Chinatown in a section called "Plum Alley" on Second South Street which lasted until 1952. The area had a network of laundromats, restaurants and oriental specialty shops.

While most residents kept within their micro-community, the residents did take part in some local Salt Lake City traditions. According to the tourist sign located at the former Chinatown, the Salt Lake City's New Year's Day Parade featured a "200 foot long Chinese dragon." According to KUED, around 1,800 Chinese lived here with "... a network of laundries, restaurants, Oriental specialty shops..." and "... gambling joints, providing the social outlet for many of the lonely residents..." who were bachelors, but Plum Alley was eventually razed "... and was replaced by Regent Street Parking Terrace".

Josie Manwill of Brigham Young University notes the effects of anti-Chinese sentiment and the Chinese Exclusion Act but attributes the decline of Salt Lake City's Chinatown primarily to the Great Depression.
