= Yemeni American Net =

Newspaper in Dearborn, Michigan, US

The Yemeni American News (YAN) is a monthly newspaper published in Dearborn, Michigan covering the Yemeni community in the United States.

== History ==
The YAN website was launched in November 2007 when Rasheed Alnozili saw the need for a connection among the Metro Detroit Diaspora.

In 2010, the YAN produced a 60-minute documentary, Yemeni Voices in America (directed by Rashid Alnozili), that featured the contributions of Yemeni people in the United States.

== Description ==
The newspaper is published by Rasheed Alnozili, who also founded the newspaper, and covers news, research and studies that are related to the Yemeni American and the Arab American communities in both the English and Arabic languages. It provides stories about individuals who symbolize success and represent a passionate motive for the community in the United States. The Yemeni American News welcomes accredited writings, opinions, studies and attempts to reach those interested in Yemeni-American affairs. The newspapers reaches 15,000 readers each month, and is published in both English and Arabic through online and print editions.
