= Little Manila, Toronto =

Neighbourhood in Toronto, Ontario, Canada

Little Manila is a Filipino ethnic enclave and neighbourhood of Toronto, Ontario, Canada. It is concentrated in the North York district, primarily around the intersection of Bathurst Street and Wilson Avenue.

There have been many annual worldwide celebration festivals or parades, such as Philippine Independence Day, that take place in the neighbourhood. "Taste of Manila", a food festival started in 2014, has marked itself as the largest street festival outside of the Philippines. A small parkette, called "Mabuhay Garden", was dedicated to Toronto's Filipino community in 2016 by City Council.

Tagalog (Filipino) is one of the languages commonly spoken in the area, and it has the highest concentration of Filipinos by ethnic origin across the city.
