= Little Yemen =

Little Yemen ليتل يمن
- Neighborhoods of the Bronx
- Location within New York City
- Coordinates: 40°50′51″N 73°52′01″W
- Country: United States
- State: New York
- Counties: Bronx County
- Agglomeration: New York metropolitan area

Little Yemen is an ethnic enclave located in the eastern half of Bronx, New York, within the Van Nest neighborhood. It is on the north edge of Van Nest and adjacent to the Pelham Parkway neighborhood. The heart of the enclave is centered around White Plains Road at the intersection with Rhinelander Avenue.

The Yemeni American community began to grow significantly after the war in Yemen began in 2014. Yahya Obeid, the Outreach Liaison for the Bronx Muslim Center, worked with Google and a journalist to officially designate the area as "Little Yemen."

There are over 500 Yemeni-owned businesses within a one-mile radius of Little Yemen, with most being delicatessens and grocery stores. Previously, the area was predominantly Italian and Latino.

The Yemeni American Day Parade has been held annually in Little Yemen since 2019. The first Yemeni American Day Parade drew over 3,000 people, including visitors from numerous states.

The area features several hookah lounges, Yemeni supermarkets, restaurants, smoke shops, and pharmacies, which are clustered around the central intersection. However, Little Yemen is not officially recognized as an independent neighborhood, and its name is more of a vernacular designation.
