= Havana Chinatown =

Neighborhood in Havana, Cuba

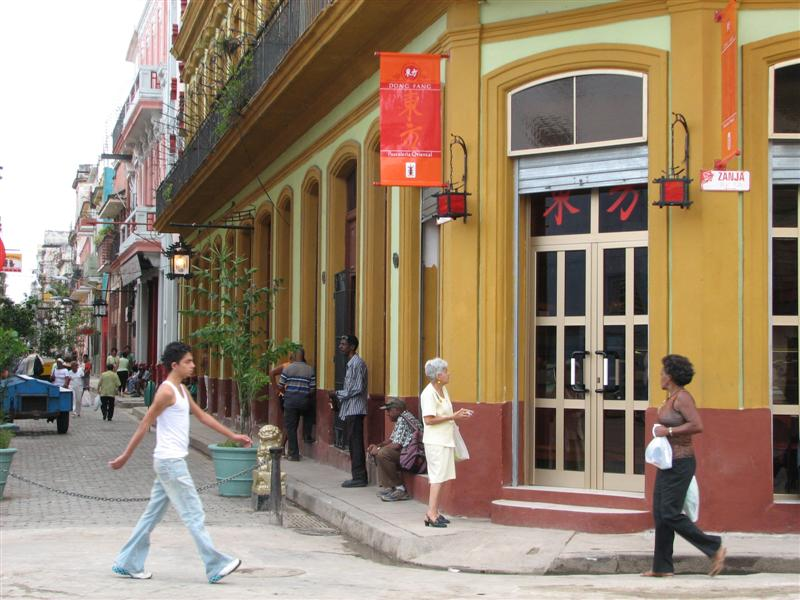
Local Chinese

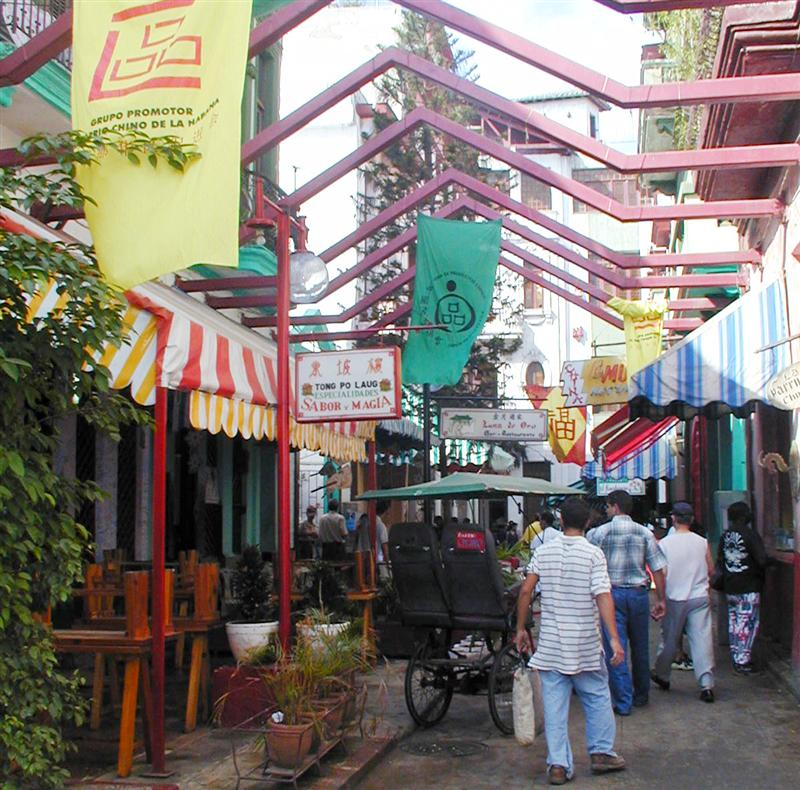
Cuchillo Street

The Havana Chinatown is in the municipality of Centro Habana and is one of the oldest and largest Chinatowns in Latin America. It is considered the second most important in the world, after that of San Francisco in the United States. The stores were founded with the money accumulated by their owners during their years as contracted workers. The first businesses opened in 1858.

== History ==
At the end of the 19th century, Chinese immigrants settled in Zanja Street and Dragons Street where, from 1874 onward, they established businesses and spaces dedicated to various services, such as small shops, bars, and laundromats. The Chinatown was the main population settlement of immigrants from China in the Caribbean. At the beginning of the 20th century, some 10,000 Chinese resided in 10 city blocks of the neighborhood, and began opening small commercial establishments. Among the stores opened were pharmacies, silk shops, stores, restaurants, cinemas, and theaters for Chinese opera performances. The Chinatown also had a chamber of commerce that functioned as a stock exchange.

Following the success of the Cuban Revolution, and the subsequent mass emigration of Cuban-Chinese to the United States, the number of ethnic Chinese in the neighborhood dropped sharply, and with them, the popularity of their restaurants.

Havana is also the only Chinatown that has its own cemetery (Cementerio General Chino, in Chinese: 中华总义山). It is located in Nuevo Vedado.

In the 1990s, the commercial premises were restored and celebrations of Chinese New Year and the anniversaries of the arrival of the first immigrants began to be held. Currently, only a very small portion of the Chinatown is inhabited by Cuban Chinese and their descendants.

== Culture ==
=== Associations ===
Founded in 1893, the Casino Chung Wah is a social club that represents the Chinese community on the island. It is headquartered in Havana. By the mid-20th century there were some 60 Chinese associations throughout Cuba. There is also the House of Chinese Arts and Traditions (in Chinese: 中华传统艺术馆), where seminars, exhibitions and colloquia are held, along with other activities such as culinary arts, dance, martial arts, painting and sculpture. The Promoter Group of the Chinatown was created in the 1990s to revive the Chinese roots and history of the Havana neighborhood. The School of Chinese Language and Arts opened its doors in 1993.

=== Journalism ===
Kwong Wah Po («Brilliant China», in Chinese: 光华报) is the only Cuban newspaper published in the Chinese language from Havana's Chinatown. It has four pages: three of them in Chinese and the last in Spanish. It has a print run of 600 copies per month and is aimed at the Chinese community with national and international news. It has been published by the Casino Chung Wah institution since March 20, 1928. Its typographic process is carried out using ancient techniques through a Linotype machine from 1900. Eight people work on the publication, three of whom are Chinese.
