= Hell to Pay (2011 film) =

- Directed by: Jay Jennings
- Written by: Jay Jennings
- Produced by: Jay Jennings
- Starring: Charles Santore
- Music by: Jay Jennings
- Release date: 2011
- Running time: 60 minutes
- Country: United States
- Language: English
- Budget: $15,000

Hell to Pay is a 2011 black-and-white neo-noir film written and directed by Jay Jennings. The film pays homage to 1950s film noir and 1970s crime dramas.

== Plot ==
"The Money Collector" (Charles Santore) is a Los Angeles debt collector with a short fuse who burns too many bridges and now must leave town before he gets himself killed. The film's narrative revolves around his life and the low-life scum that he encounters in his everyday life. When he is not collecting money, threatening people in broad daylight, or getting blowjobs from hookers, he is often being scolded by the underworld crime boss that he works for. His family life is not much better. His estranged wife and deadbeat father only come around when they need money and the only person in his life that he trusts is his mentor, a former collector who gives him a chance to get out of the racket before things take a turn for the worse. Of course he does not take his mentor's advice, which leads to the most stable person in his world being murdered on the direct orders of his own boss. This act of betrayal sets in motion the film's climatic showdown.

== Production ==
Produced for $15,000, Hell to Pay is a loose remake of Jennings' Loanshark (1999). The film was shot on location, all around Los Angeles, Hollywood, Silver Lake, Santa Monica, and Beverly Hills, using actual buildings, apartments, offices, streets, alleys, parks, shopping centers, and dive bars which added to the film's realistic look and feel.

== Reception ==
"Fast-paced and hilariously foul, Hell to Pay is a tribute to such hard-boiled, 1970s crime films as Mean Streets and The Outfit. Lead actor Charles Santore does a fine job of carrying the entire film, letting loose with violent outbursts of both verbal and physical abuse but becoming increasingly vulnerable as the story spins to its revengeful climax." --- Mondo Digital. Films In Review columnist David Del Valle in his review wrote: "In Hell to Pay, writer-director Jay Jennings has given us a relentless ride through the city of angels with nods to such film noir classics as Out of the Past and On Dangerous Ground, as well as, the gritty realism of Guy Ritchie’s films, using the same archetypes of film noir, choosing his leads as anti-heroes, with dark agents collecting their fees from the doomed folks that owe them their lives."
