= Burt Lancaster: An American Life =

Burt Lancaster: An American Life is a 2000 non-fiction book by Kate Buford, published by Alfred A. Knopf, about Burt Lancaster.

Molly Haskell of The New York Times wrote that the book shows that, in regards to Lancaster, there was "more to him than met the eye."

According to Publishers Weekly, a "central theme" involved Lancaster's advocacy for leftist politics, which involved him with the House Un-American Activities Committee.

== Background ==
Kate Buford worked as a commentator for National Public Radio.

Buford saw films starring Lancaster in her childhood and re-centered focus on him after seeing Atlantic City in 1981. Her interest was piqued by how, despite being a senior citizen, he had kept himself in relatively good shape. She learned that there had been no in-depth critical study books about Lancaster and decided to write one.

She did research for five years, consulting 200 works, including books and individual articles. The back cover has an image of Lancaster without clothing that she saw at the Museum of Modern Art; she received permission to use the photograph from the family of Lancaster, and she selected it a she felt it was thematically relevant to her book. Citing a need for privacy, the children of Lancaster did not collaborate in making the book. Therefore, they did not provide any interviews. The author did not interview Lancaster, who died in 1994.

In regards to the author's view of the actor, she stated "I couldn't decide from one moment to the next whether I liked him or not and, in the end, I think that's a pretty realistic way of looking at him."

== Content ==
Beitiks stated that the way the author wrote about Lancaster showed him as having, in Beitiks' words, "a mean streak, ill-tempered tirades on the set and a Sinatralike demand for loyalty."

One review states that Buford's book revealed "the private Lancaster."

== Reception ==
Mick LaSalle of the San Francisco Chronicle stated that the book sold very well and that the book reviews were "glowing". Jay Jennings, in The New York Times, described the book as "highly praised".

Publishers Weekly gave the book a starred review and that it is "well-researched and engaging".

Edvins Beitiks of the San Francisco Chronicle stated that the book is "engaging" and "a fascinating, no-nonsense read" despite the lack of primary source interviewing. Beitiks acknowledged that the author could not fully decide her view of the actor, though Beitiks felt that "it leaves too many questions behind."

Todd McCarthy of Variety described the book as "superb".

Sienna Powers of January Magazine described the book as "well-rendered ".

Bob Reising of the University of Central Arkansas stated that the book showed that the author became "one of the nation's premier biographers." He concluded the book "is an enlightening biography."

Robert Bell of the Austin Chronicle ultimately did not recommend the book because he felt the book does not make a conclusion on what Lancaster's personality was like, though he stated some portions of the book were "potentially fascinating", and he stated that the contents discussing Lancaster's acting were the "keenest insights".

== See also ==
- Native American Son - Another book by Buford
