= Native American Son =

Native American Son: The Life and Sporting Legend of Jim Thorpe is a 2010 non-fiction book by Kate Buford, published by Alfred A. Knopf. It is now published by University of Nebraska Press.

The subject is Jim Thorpe, a Native American sportsman who played football, baseball, and basketball, participated in the Olympic Games in 1912, and became an actor in Hollywood films. The author draws on many historical resources to describe the man, his cultural background, and the times he lived in.

== Summary ==
The book is divided into three sections. Part I describes his early life, Part II describes his Olympic and baseball periods and Part III covers his film career, right up to his death.

== Reception ==
Jay Jennings, in The New York Times had a more positive reception to the parts about his acting than the part about his initial life, arguing that the portion about acting described the Los Angeles film industry in a way that has it "brims with life", while the early life part had "dryness". Jennings argued that overall the book "is kind of a downer" due to its emphasis on hardships.

Steve Kaufman of The Courier-Journal stated that the life of Thorpe was "absorbing" but he criticized the book for having factual errors, citing ones related to baseball.

Bob Reising of the University of Central Arkansas stated that the author did "commendable research", and that the book highlights that the author is "one of the nation's premier biographers". He added that academics would enjoy the book, but that non-academic audiences may dislike how the author does not find a definitive portrayal of the subject.

Philip Kopper, in American Heritage magazine, praised the "sound research and skillful writing".

Bruce A. Rubenstein of University of Michigan–Flint praised the portions stating Thorpe's biographical information, arguing that in those the book "is a compelling" work, and that it is "at its best", and that it is "vivid and heartfelt". Rubenstein criticized other parts of the book for factual errors about the period Thorpe played baseball, and he added that the book had "serious weaknesses" in talking about U.S. Native American policies. He recommended the book only for the biographical information about Thorpe.

John Strawn, in The Oregonian, stated that he understood that making the biography was difficult because Thorpe gave relatively little testimony about himself, and what he did give was deemed by Strawn to be "dubious". Strawn added that there were some errors in the book despite "diligence" by the author, and that the book conflates culture and racial identity.

Kirkus Reviews stated that the work was "impeccably researched" and praises the "attention to detail", but it criticized the "minutiae" which "obscure the narrative core".

Publishers Weekly stated that the book "dispels many fictions about" Thorpe in addition to giving factual detail.

== See also ==
- Burt Lancaster: An American Life - Another book by Buford
