= Beverly Park (amusement park) =

1950s amusement park

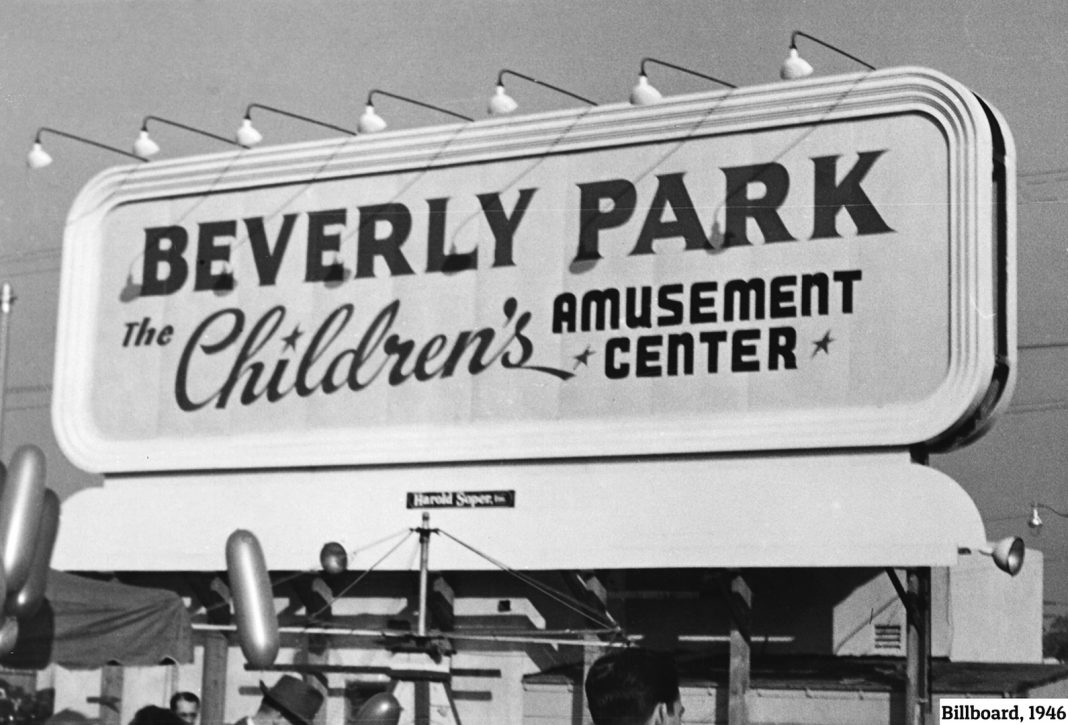
- "The 'Kiddieland' that Inspired Walt Disney"
- Interactive map of Beverly Park
- Location: Los Angeles, California, United States
- Coordinates: 34.075°N 118.377°W
- Status: Defunct
- Opened: 1943
- Closed: 1974
- Owner: David Bradley
- General manager: Bud Benner
- Slogan: The greatest children's amusement center on earth
- Operating season: Weekends and Holidays
- Area: 400 by 200 feet

Attractions
- Total: 12

Beverly Park was an amusement park located in Los Angeles, California, at the corner of Beverly Boulevard and La Cienega. Owned and operated by David Bradley from 1943 to 1974, it was considered an important source of attractions for children during the 1950s. It was also an important source of inspiration for Walt Disney who, following Bradley's example, later founded Disneyland.

The area welcomed a significant number of citizens and visitors, so Beverly Park and the other Kiddielands experienced popularity and success during their operating years.

== Location and access ==
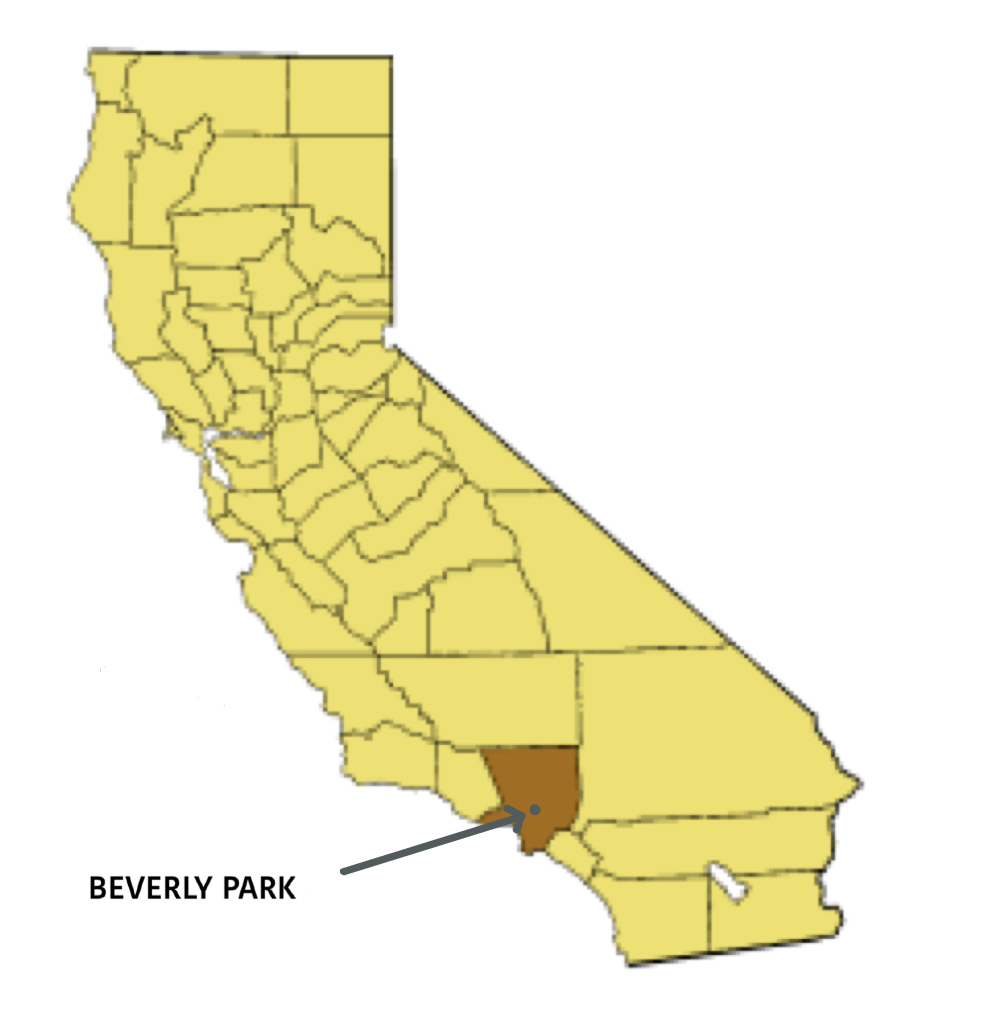
Former location of Beverly Park, CA

Beverly Park was located in the city of Los Angeles, just outside the city limits of West Hollywood, California. The location was in a rural area suitable for attractions and rides for children. The park was located next to the largest drugstore in the world and close to Ponyland, an amusement site owned and operated by Leo "Pat" Murphy and his wife, Viva Murphy at 8536 Beverly Boulevard. The park initially measured 200 by 200 feet (0.91 acre), doubling in size in the first four years to reach 400 by 200 feet (1.83 acres) by 1947.

== History ==
=== Origins ===
Beverly Park was affectionately known and referred to as "Kiddieland", as it was mainly targeted to children. The "Kiddieland" phenomenon was not a franchise in its original sense, but a general noun identifying amusement parks designed specifically for children. Redondo Beach, West Los Angeles, Woodland Hills and Westchester were among the locations in Los Angeles County where Kiddielands were built. The concept of "Kiddieland" was born after World War II, as the amusement park industry expanded due to the post-war economic situation and the baby boom that occurred until the 1960s. During the 1950s, both the employment rate and social welfare in the surrounding area improved, allowing people to divert their thoughts from conflict and post-war austerity to a new lifestyle, based on innovation and pleasure.

=== Opening ===
Frock & Meyer Company built Beverly Park in 1943 in West Lost Angeles, when the park opened. In 1945, Dave Bradley purchased the park from them with his partner Donald Kaye, under the name of his ride manufacturing company named Bradley & Kaye Amusement Company.

It hosted twelve child-sized rides including roller coasters and fun houses, as well as several restaurants, places dedicated to animals, food stands and candy shops.

The lot already contained some old rides (a carousel, Dodgem bumper cars and a Ferris wheel) abandoned by a bankrupt carnival. These were later restored by Bradley and incorporated into the new park.

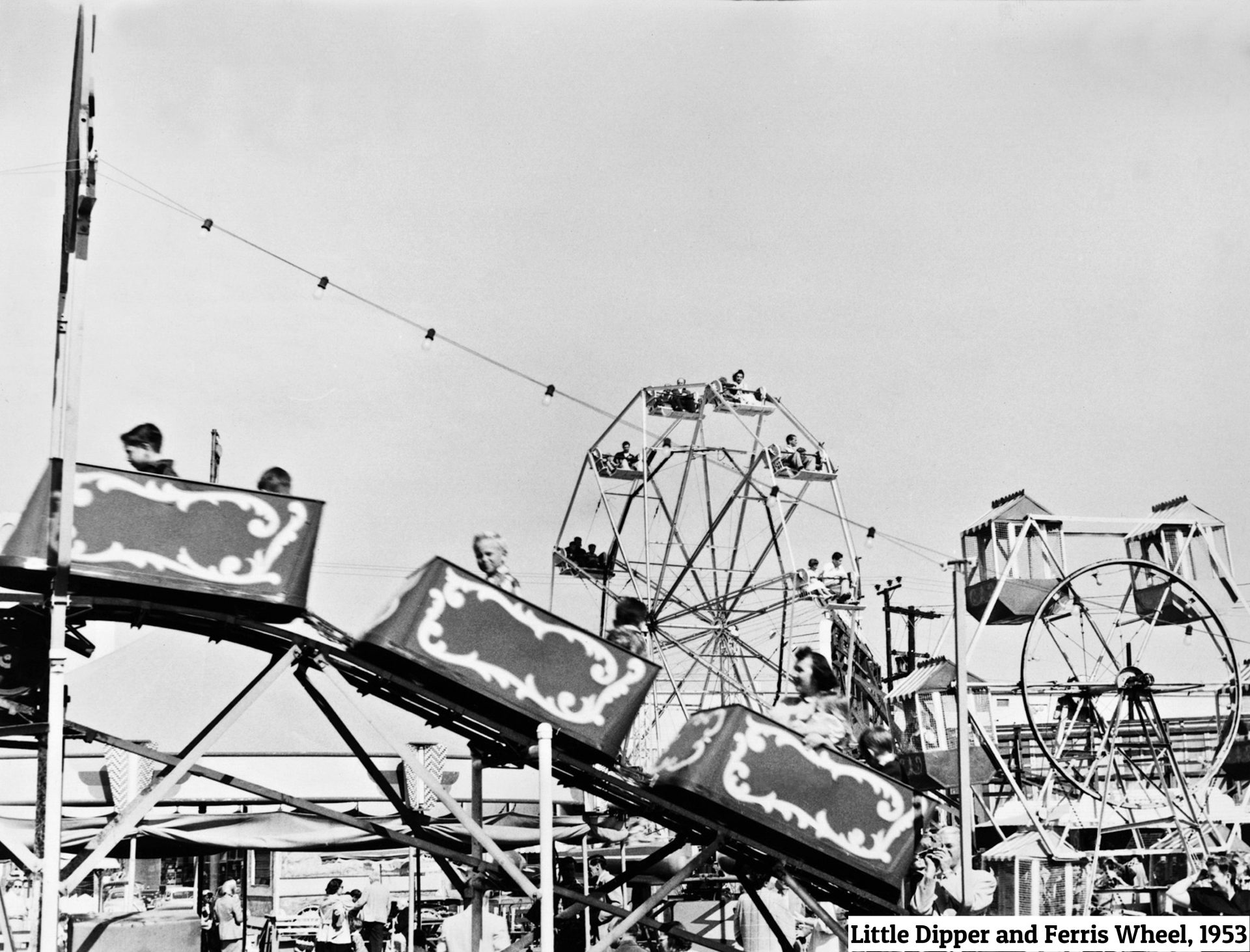
Ferris Wheel and Little Dipper, Beverly Park, Los Angeles, California, 1953

Bradley & Kaye Amusement Co., which was based in Long Beach, leased the land on which Beverly Park once stood from the Beverly Oil Company.

One of the co-owners of the company, Don Kaye, decided to abandon the project in 1946, to devote himself to the music industry, leaving Bradley to run the park alone. Despite this, the company maintained its original name. Bradley & Kaye Amusement Co. started producing and selling rides and accessories to the Allan Herschell Company after signing an agreement that lasted from 1948 to 1986, the year in which Bradley and Kaye's company was purchased by Chance Rides.

David Bradley was born in California on May 11, 1911. He studied economics at Dartmouth College, but had always been interested in engineering and subsequently developed this passion over the years. During World War II, he worked at Lockheed Aircraft Company, as a toolmaker, before he started creating ideas to amuse his sister's children and thus became an amusement ride inventor.

Although Bradley had no experience in the area of amusement park management, he decided to develop the enterprise, and within three years he became the official owner of the park by paying off his obligations. His biggest goal was to make Beverly Park immaculate and to allow customers to feel safe and comfortable on all the rides. The park was designed to enable children to feel important and to provide a positive experience for all its visitors. In order to keep their attention and to further improve the park's atmosphere, he decorated many of his attractions with special murals, flowers, and tunnels so that guests always had something interesting to look at and explore.

=== Operating years ===
Bradley's family helped him manage Beverly Park. His wife Bernice, whom he met at the Walt Disney Studio, worked in the park box office and focused on gathering resources to make the park memorable for visitors. The two decided to start a family and adopted two twins, John and Laura. Bernice's brother, Bud Benner, was Beverly Park's general manager who also worked with Bradley to restore and create innovative rides.

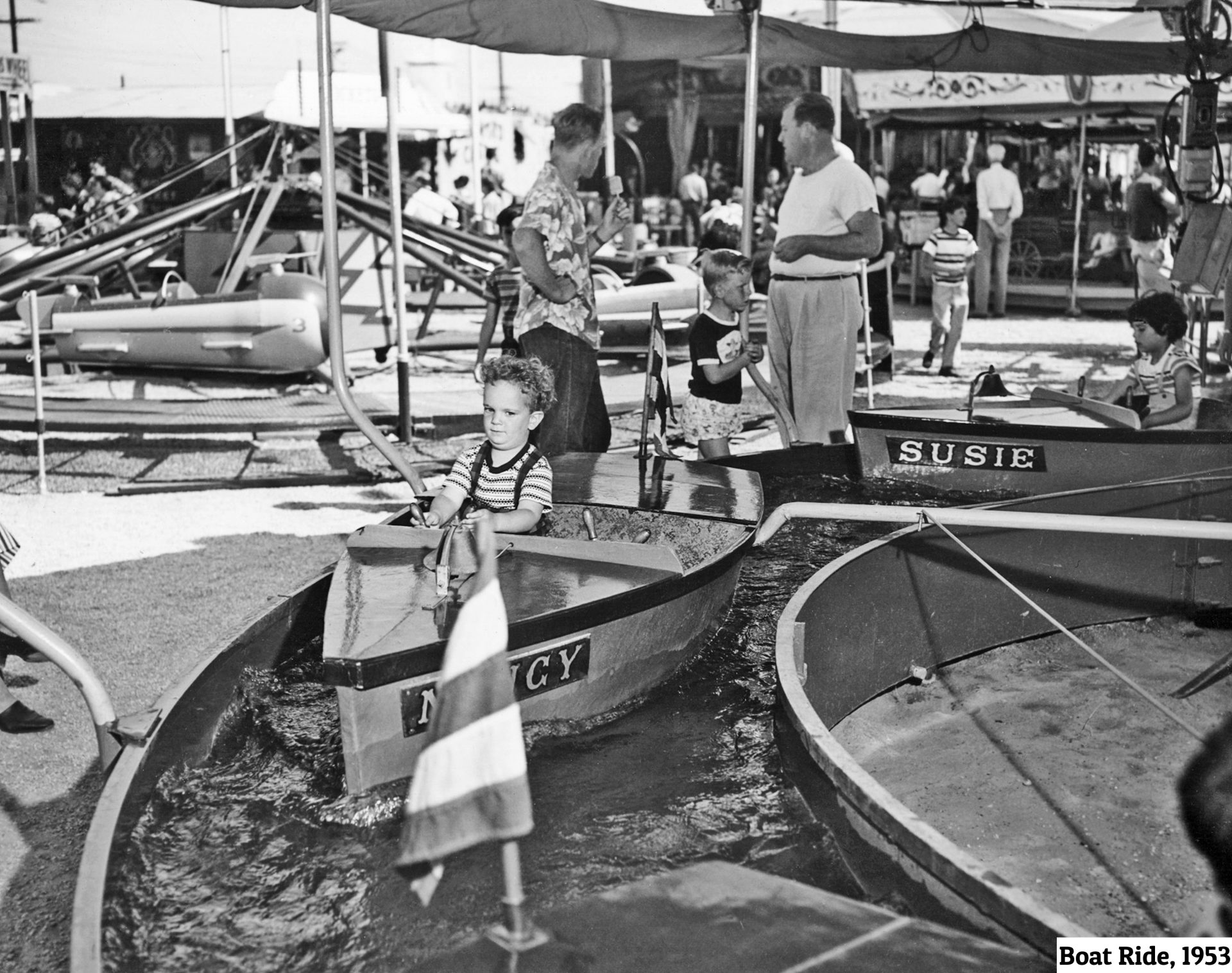
Boat Ride, Beverly Park, Los Angeles, California, 1953

After Bradley had established his business in Los Angeles, he founded another amusement park in the San Fernando Valley, which was used as a testing ground to study the impact of newly designed rides and their likelihood of success once installed in Beverly Park. He was also subsequently named manager of Virginia Park in Long Beach.

One of the frequent visitors of Beverly Park was Walt Disney himself. He used to bring his children there, ask them what they loved about the attractions and he used to talk with David Bradley about the amusement park industry and its development. The two started working together soon after, when Disney hired Bradley as a consultant for five years, from 1950 to 1955. During this time, Bradley visited Europe to take pictures of interesting rides and to gain ideas to design a new Amusement Park. It was then that Bradley came up with the concept of the famous "Main Street" and convinced Disney to build it.

Starting from 1955, on his return from Europe, he focused solely on operating Beverly Park, but not before leaving his influences in Anaheim's brand new recreation area, the soon to be Disneyland.

Colorful carousel horses made the three-quarter-acre park easy to be noticed, as well as the letters "B", "E", "V". The ticket offices were located at the entrance, where visitors could pay 15 cents for each ticket, or $3 for 30 tickets.

Beverly Park benefited from its proximity to Hollywood and was a popular place for movie stars who brought their families, hoping to get some "quality time" (and a good opportunity to take photos of their children) into their busy schedule. Many Hollywood film stars of the 1940s, 1950s and 1960s, including Carol Burnett, Errol Flynn, Lana Turner, Norm Crosby, Kirk Douglas and Dan Duryea, visited the park's attractions with their children. Famous musicians such as John Lennon and Sonny & Cher used to bring their children and families there.

In Beverly Park's heyday, Bradley was developing plans to cover the entirety of Beverly Park by having it roofed, so that the park could stay open in times of bad weather, such as rain or snow. This ambition never came to fruition due to the closing of the park.

=== Closure ===
In the late 1950s the amusement park industry peaked. After that it began to decline due to urban decay, suburban growth, and the creation and rapid growth of new entertainment sources, such as television. In addition to these broad socioeconomic trends, a range of specific factors contributed to the slow decline and consequent closure of Beverly Park in 1974.

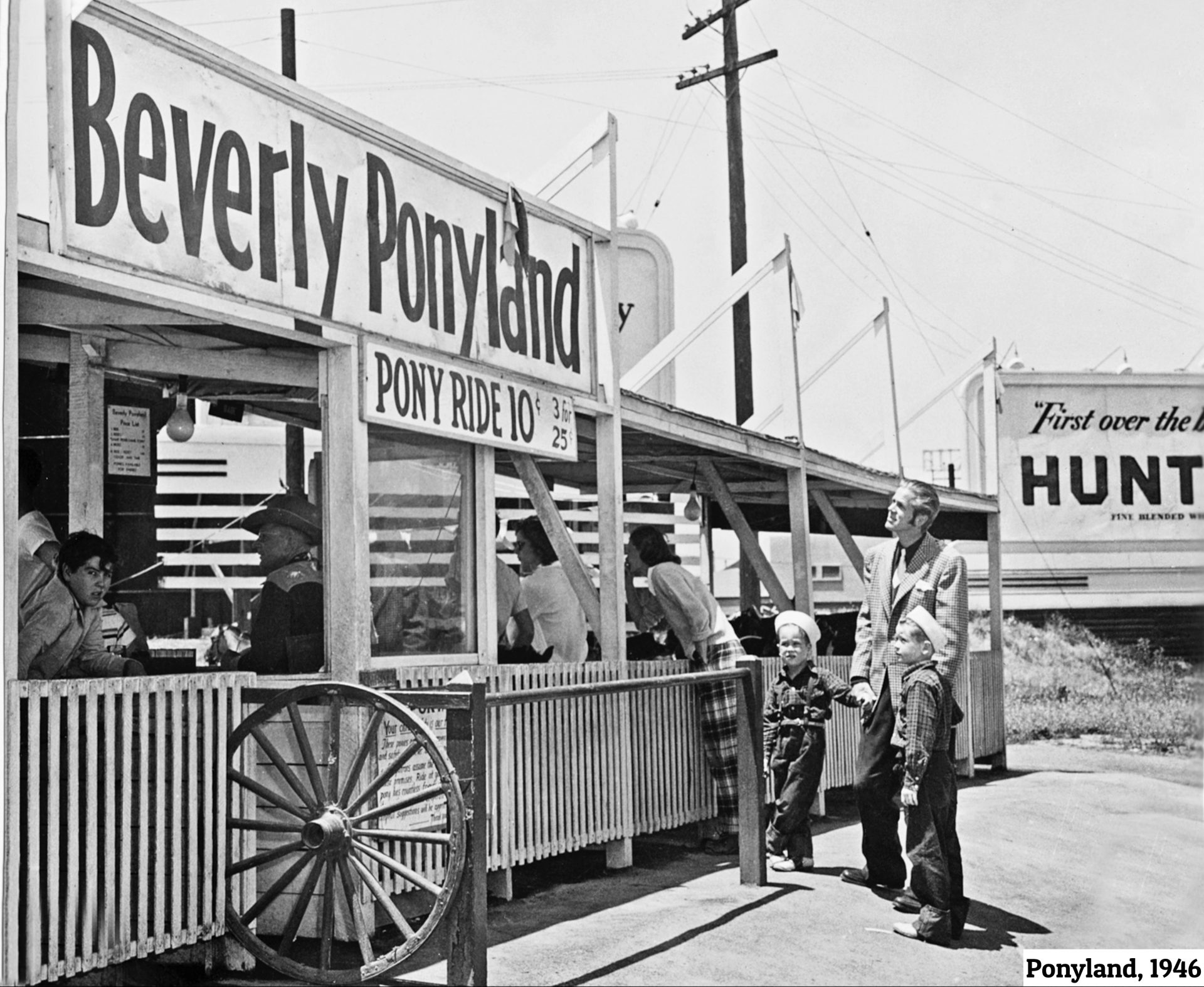
Beverly Ponyland, Los Angeles, California, 1946

These factors included the ever-increasing rent, the rise in the amount of oil being drilled near the park, and Bradley's stress in running the business. The Bradley and Kaye Manufacturing Plant in Long Beach also shifted Bradley's attention from the park to his growing business specialized in renovating, creating and selling carousel animals.

After Beverly Park closed, Bradley continued to build and launch new and more modern rides. One of the most famous rides restored by Bradley was the 1916 C. W. Parker carousel which appeared in other amusement parks throughout South California such as Ocean Park Pier and Looff Hippodrome on the Santa Monica Pier.

After closure, the sign "closed for renovations" was hung up on the chained gate that used to be the entrance to Beverly Park. Some of the rides inside the park remained on the premises after closure.

While Beverly Park was officially closed in 1974, Ponyland lasted until 1979. The two locations were both replaced by the Beverly Center in 1982. Some features of Beverly Park can be found in Disneyland's attractions, structure and philosophy. For example, the idea of taking a family photo based on a specific theme was invented and spread by David Bradley himself and afterwards reused by Walt Disney, who also shared Bradley's suggestion in creating rides whose height was not frightening nor discouraging. This has been one of the many factors that have made Walt Disney's concept successful.

== Amenities ==
=== Food stands ===
Beverly Park had a number of food stands selling popcorn, hot dogs, cotton candy and peanuts. These snacks were packed in striped paper bags, which made them easily recognizable and added value to the overall feel and atmosphere of the park.

=== Rides ===
Beverly Park was characterized by twelve rides. Each of them was based on its own particular theme and they were:

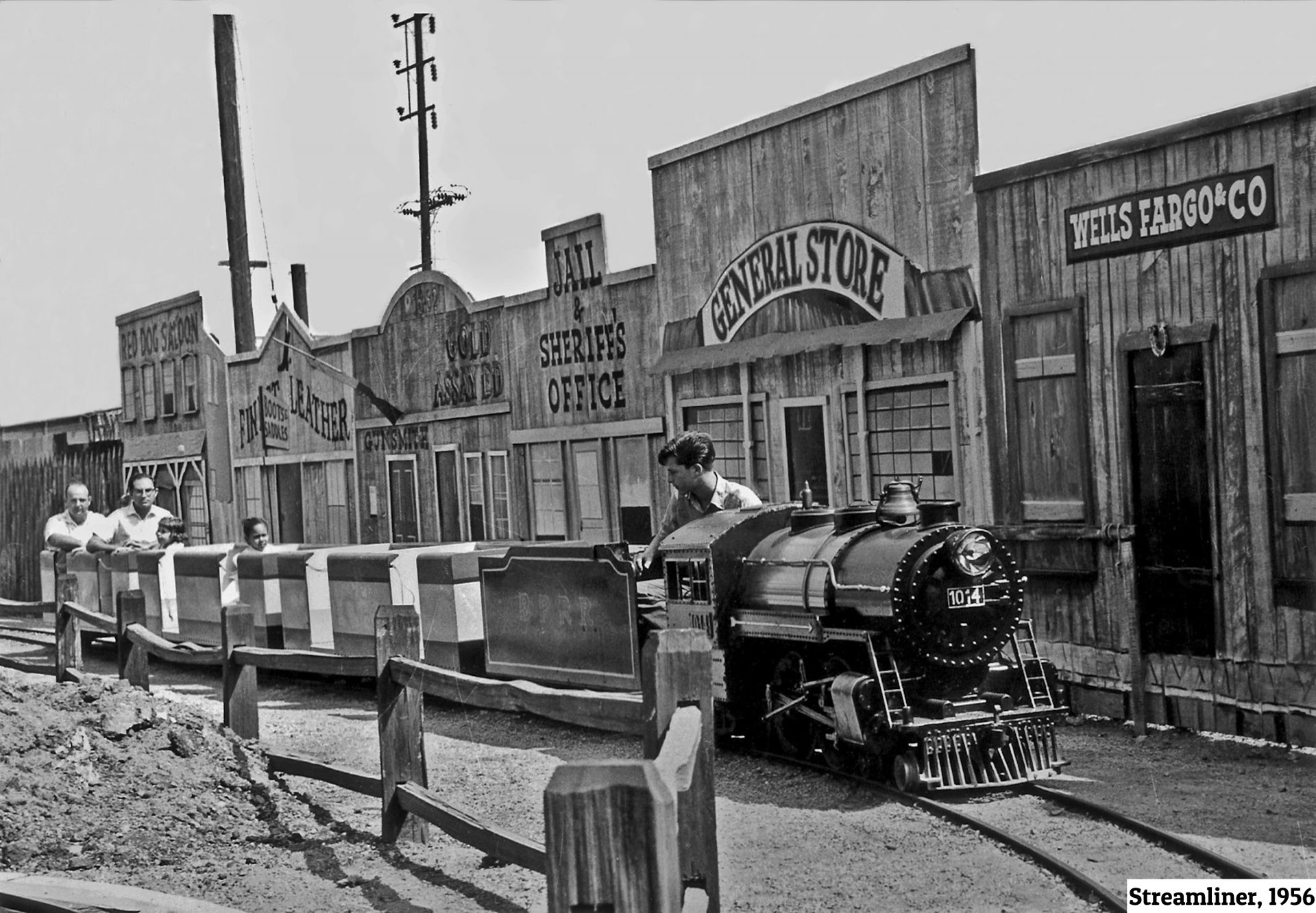
Streamliner, Beverly Park, Los Angeles, California, 1956

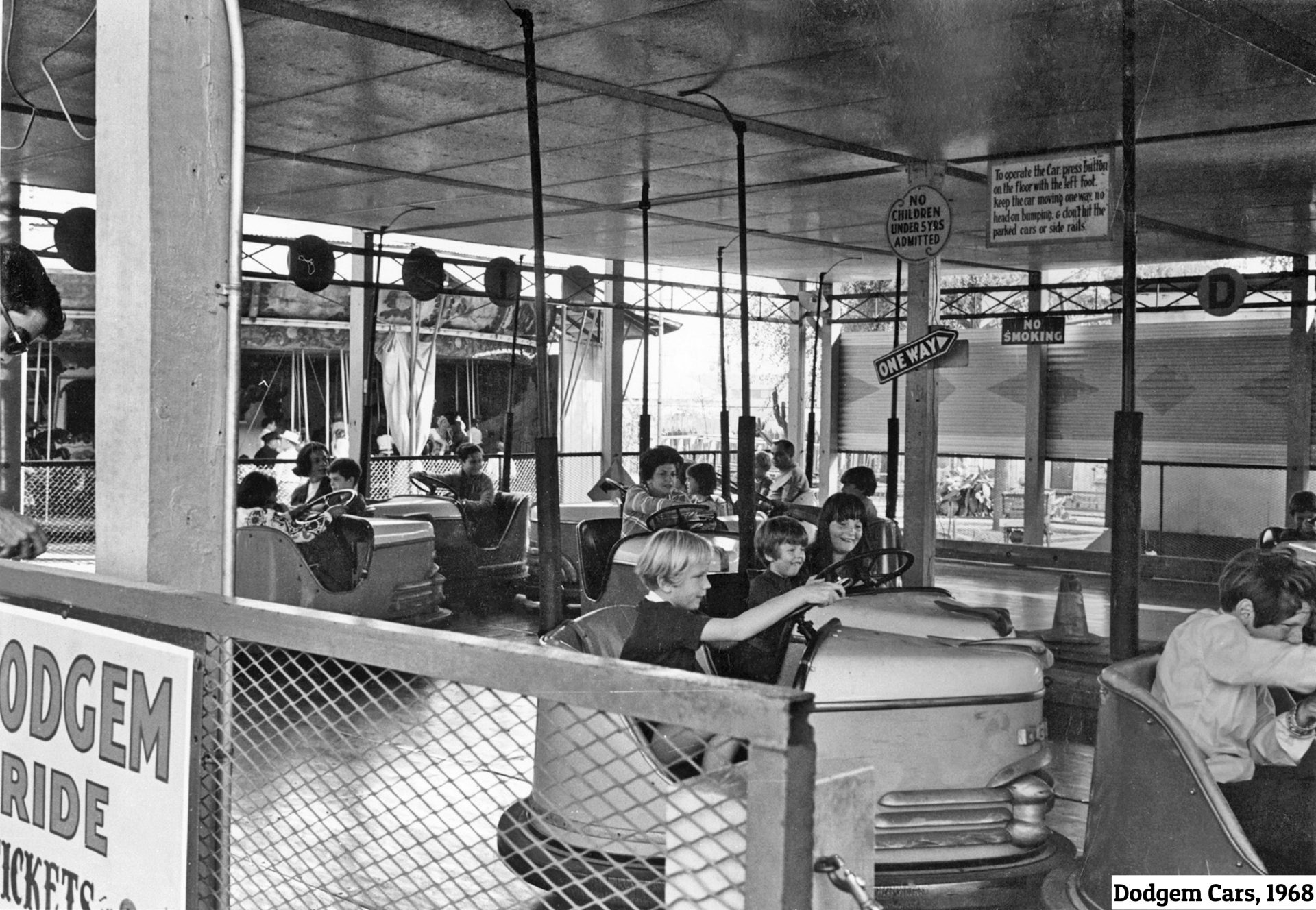
Dodgem Cars, Beverly Park, Los Angeles, California, 1968

Number	Ride	Description
1	Carousels (two sizes available)	Beverly Park's carousel included animal-shaped seats. It was built by C. W. Parker.
2	Ferris wheel	The Ferris Wheel was one of the abandoned rides left by a carnival before David Bradley purchased the park. The seats of the ride were built using benches and railings to keep the children from falling out.
3	Dodgem bumper cars	Dodgem bumper cars allowed kids to drive small electric cars protected by bumpers that they could drive against each other.
4	Funhouse	Beverly Park's funhouses were called the Haunted Castle and Moons-ville.
5	Little Dipper	Miniature and portable roller coaster designed for children. It was first designed for Beverly Park, but soon after, the Little Dipper was also distributed to other amusement parks.
6	Streamliner	A children's ride featuring train-shaped seats, following a looped track.
7	Motorama	Car ride designed for older children who had the possibility to "drive" and steer their cars along a roadway.
8	Helicopter ride	This ride was characterized by helicopter-shaped seats that moved in a circular motion. It was invented by Bradley and commercialized by Allan Herschell Company.
9	"U Fly It" or whirly birds	A carousel where visitors could fly a miniature plane.
10	Tilt-A-Whirl	The Tilt-A-Whirl ride rotated on a horizontal plane.
11	Buggy The Whale	This ride was similar to a carousel, but the seats were whale-shaped and it moved up and down.
12	Tooner-Ville electric trolley	This electric ride had one seat and by inserting coins, it moved and shook. It was very similar to modern electric cars or horses.

Fun houses changed according to the time of year. Moons-ville and the Haunted Castle were well known and appreciated among visiting children. Notably, the Haunted Castle ride became famous after the park closed, when a film crew shooting there discovered that one of the props was a real corpse.

During the thirty years of existence of the amusement park, the old rides were modified or sold, while new rides were created and implemented in the park. For example, the Little Dipper was sold after many years to other engineers, while decorative animals including "Tony the African Lion" and "Susy the California Black Bear" were exhibited in circus wagons.

== Marketing and publicity ==
Bradley publicized the park extensively, including regular coverage in Billboard (magazine). He also did not discourage gate-crashers, and marketed into both the local community and Hollywood with his Birthday Book and Guest Book initiatives.

=== "Birthday Book" ===
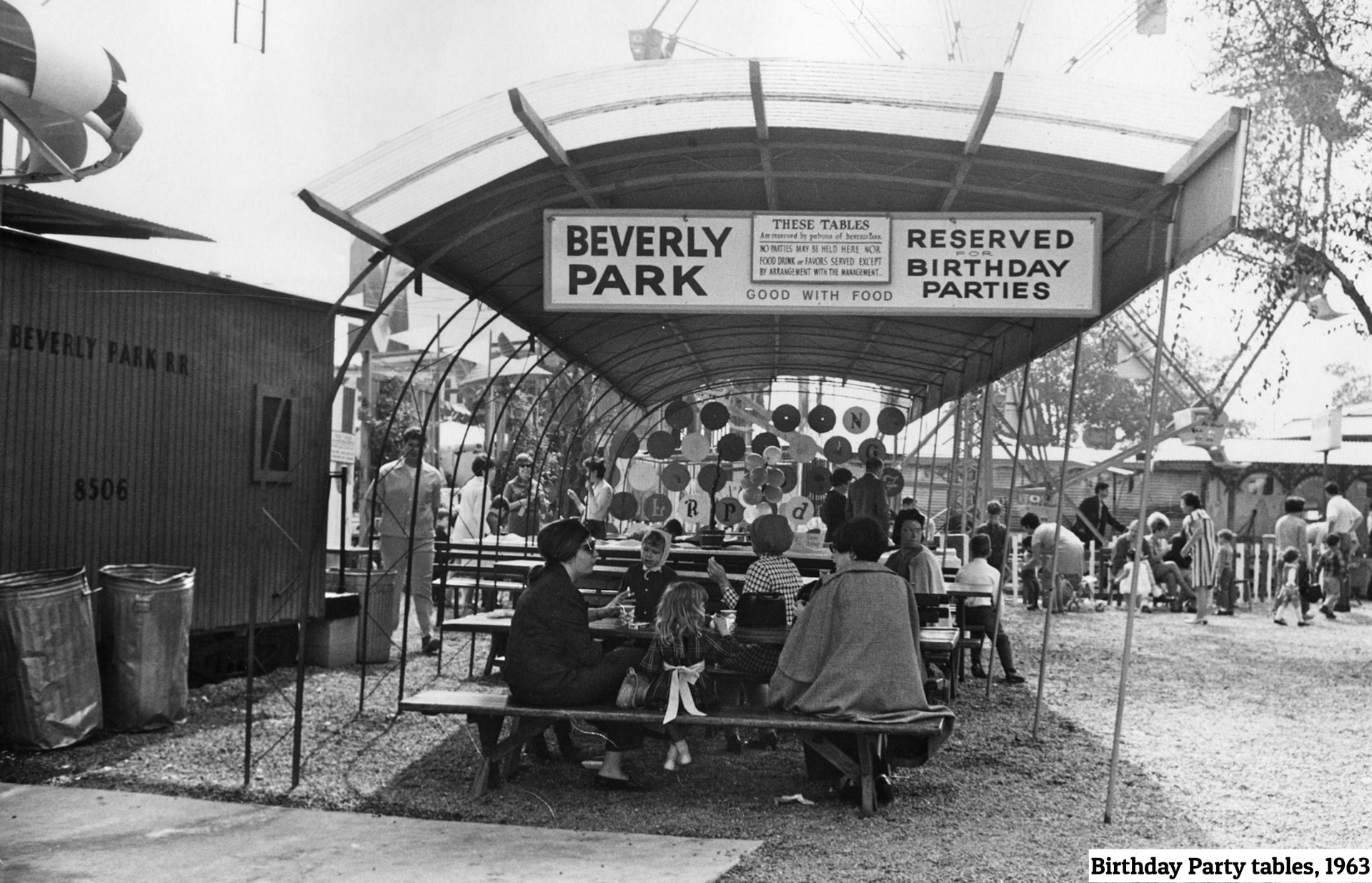
Birthday Party tables, Beverly Park, Los Angeles, California, 1963

In addition to engineering innovations, David Bradley also developed early initiatives in advertising to children such as what was known as the "Birthday Book". This was a book containing all the birth dates of the children living within the area of the park that he could obtain. In doing so, he made it possible to send each of them a balloon and a greeting card for his or her birthday, which was often celebrated at the park itself. For example, Bunker Spreckels, son of Kay Williams, celebrated his third birthday there.

Many other famous people took advantage of this: Van Johnson, Loretta Young, Charles Correll, Burt Lancaster, Alice Faye and Phil Harris hosted parties at the park, during which they could enjoy the rides, balloons, clown cakes, favors and refreshments offered by Bradley.

=== "Guest Book" ===
Besides the Birthday Book, Bradley created a "Guest Book", which contained the signatures of many famous people who were regular clients of the park. These included Glenn Ford, Charles Boyer, Bob Hutton, Robert Walker, Mary Pickford, Paul Henreid, Ann Rutherford, Ingrid Bergman, Judy Garland, Charles Chaplin, Oona O'Neil, Cleatus Caldwell, Norman Taurog, Kay Kyser, Jack Carson, Ken Murray, Joan Bennett, Walter Wanger, Franchot Tone, Brian Donlevy, Roy Rogers, Margaret O'Brien, John Garfield and many others. The guest book was not only a fun way for visitors to see which celebrities had visited the park, but it also contributed to improve its reputation.

== Present-day site ==
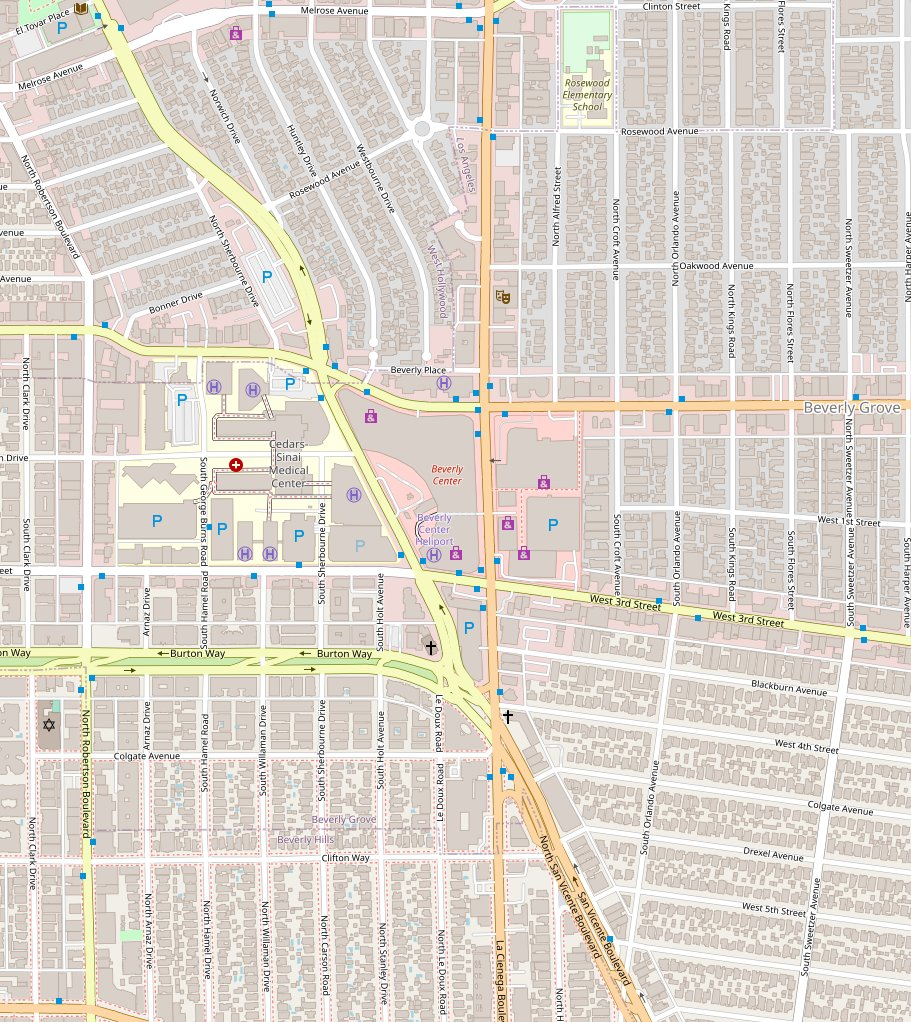
Map showing Beverly Center on the former site of Beverly Park

The original site of Beverly Park is now the location of the Beverly Center Shopping Mall, which is located between San Vicente Boulevard, La Cienega Boulevard, Beverly Boulevard, and Third Street. The park site was originally occupied by underground oil wells which can still be found underneath the modern buildings.

== In popular culture ==
=== Books ===
Beverly Park has been widely referenced in popular fiction, including books by:

- Hartman, et al.
- Carrie White
- Andrew McAleer
- Bruce Kimmel
- Jay Jennings

Jay Jennings, a US film producer and author, used to visit Beverly Park frequently when he was a child. His experiences, findings and thoughts are collected in his book: Beverly Park: L.A.'s Kiddieland, 1943–74, which is entirely focused on the park's history and legacy and it includes a wide range of original photographs. Jennings is currently working on a documentary about Beverly Park.

=== Films ===
Many films were partially filmed at Beverly Park, such as:

- Sylvia (1965 film), starring Carroll Baker and George Maharis
- Three on a Couch with Jerry Lewis and Janet Leigh (1966)
- My Pal Gus
- Strangers on a Train with Farley Granger, Ruth Roman and Robert Walker (1951) Alfred Hitchcock, the director, engaged Bradley to work as a technical advisor for the carousel used in this movie.

Something Wicked This Way Comes (film), produced by Walt Disney Productions and released in 1982, also required Bradley's help in providing the carousel used in the film.

=== Remembering Beverly Park ===
During the last twenty years of the park's operations, from 1954 to 1974, the site was filled with up to 30,000 visitors on a single weekend. Beverly Park's popularity is still widely remembered by many Los Angeles area citizens who used to enjoy its rides.

During the fall of 2020, the City of West Hollywood's Art Division presented "Remembering Beverly Park", an exhibition shown at the West Hollywood Library. The event was intended to bring the memory of Beverly Park to life by displaying photographs taken from Jay Jennings' book dedicated to the amusement park: Beverly Park: L.A.'s Kiddieland, 1943–74.

== Photo Gallery ==
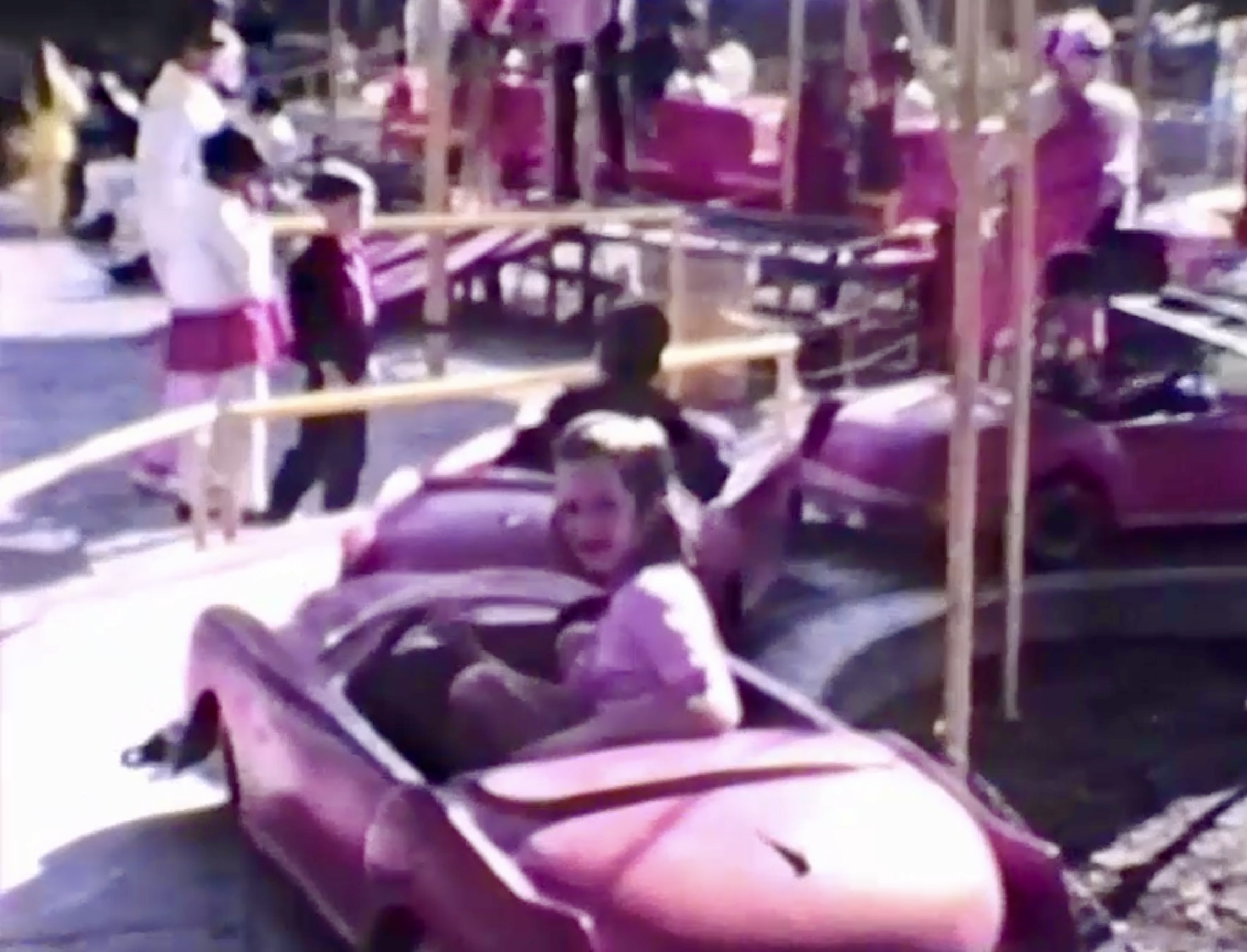
Beverly Park's ride named Motorama, Los Angeles, California, U.S.

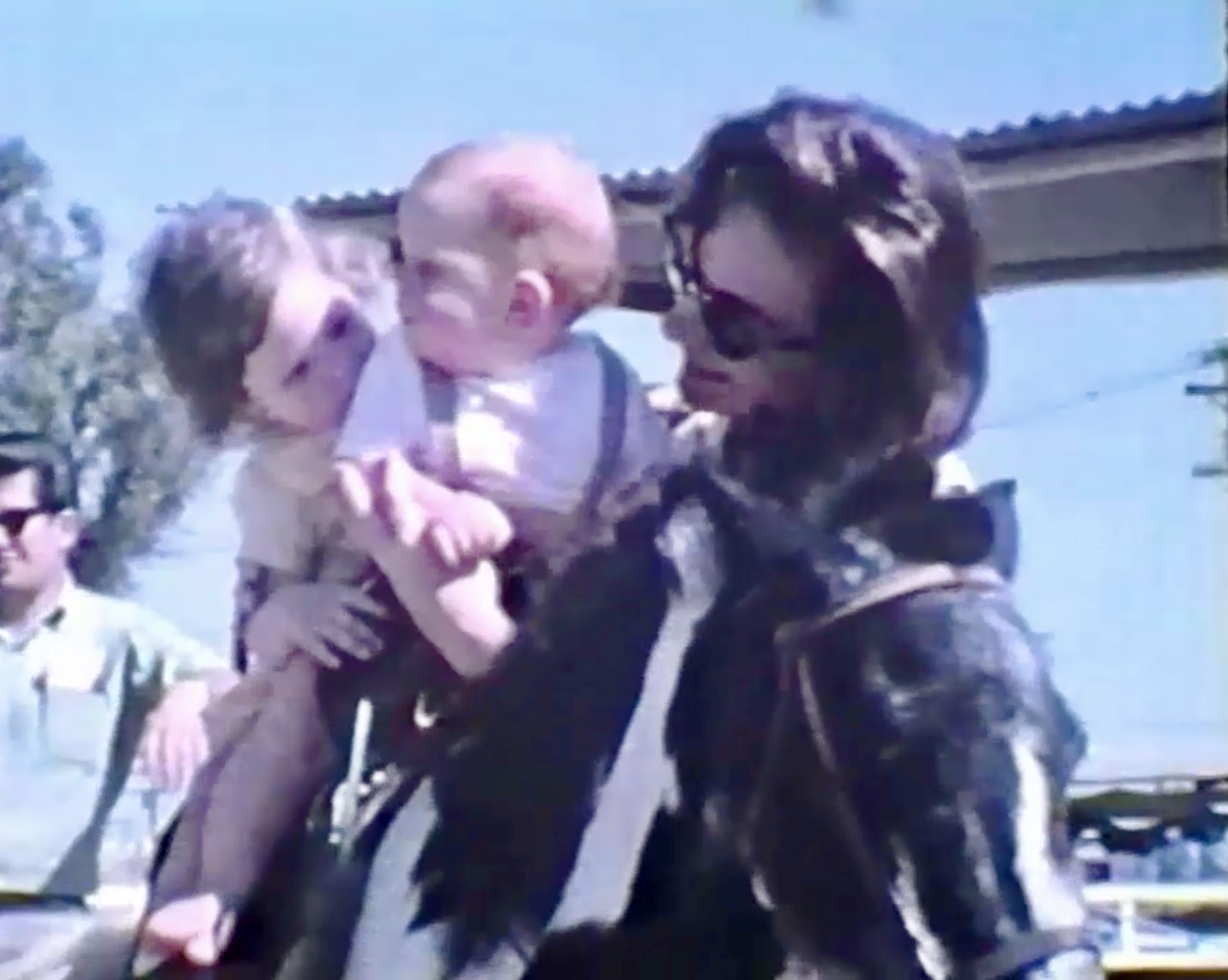
Family at Beverly Park, Los Angeles, California, U.S.

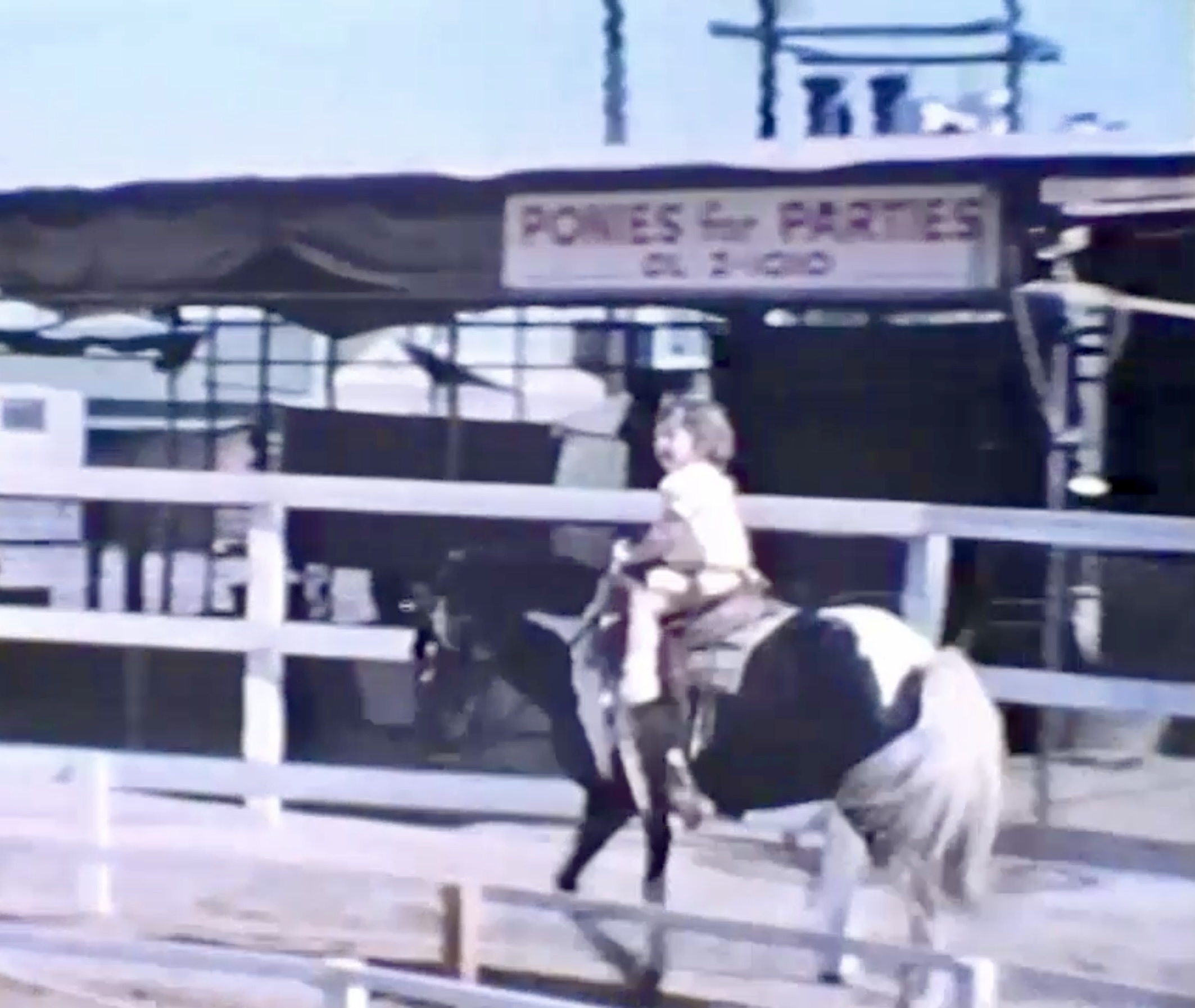
Child at Ponyland, Los Angeles, California, U.S.

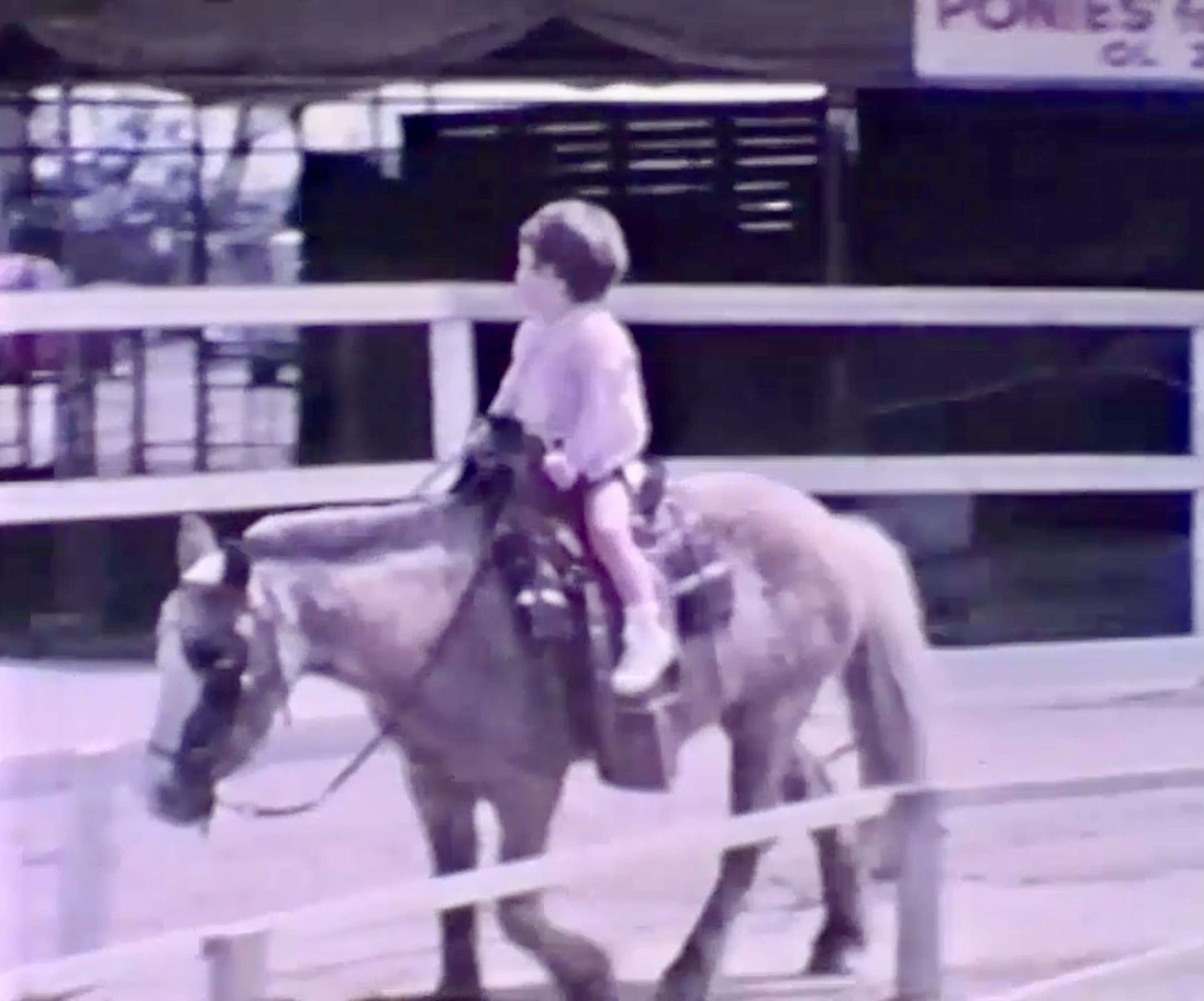
Child riding a pony, Ponyland, Los Angeles, California, U.S.

== See also ==
- List of defunct amusement parks in the United States
