= Loanshark (film) =

- Directed by: Jay Jennings
- Written by: Jay Jennings
- Produced by: Jay Jennings; Charles Santore (co-producer)
- Starring: Charles Santore
- Music by: Jay Jennings
- Distributed by: Indie-Underground
- Release date: December 10, 1999
- Running time: 80 minutes
- Country: United States
- Language: English
- Budget: $10,000

Loanshark is a 1999 black-and-white American crime film written and directed by Jay Jennings. The film is a notable forerunner in the digital filmmaking movement.

== Plot ==
An angry loan shark has a tendency of getting excessively violent with anyone who doesn't have his money. His mob boss disapproves of his actions, warning him to tone things down or else. As expected, things only get worse.

== Production ==
Produced for $10,000, Loanshark was made using handheld digital movie cameras and available light, with film look added in post-production. The low-budget film was shot guerrilla filmmaking style among old Hollywood buildings and streets.

== Reception ==
Loanshark screened at several film festivals in 2000, including Silver Lake and Melbourne Underground Film Festival. Films In Review columnist David Del Valle called Loanshark "a gritty crime tale in the manner of Bad Lieutenant ".
