= Jay Jennings =

American independent filmmaker and author

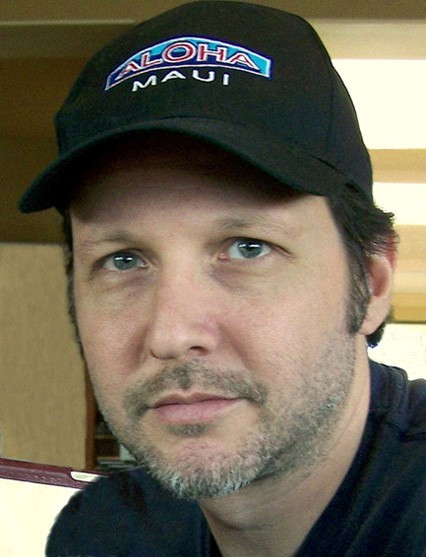
- Born: August 23, 1965; Hollywood, CA, USA
- Occupation(s): Independent filmmaker, author
- Years active: 1999–present

Jay Robert Jennings (born August 23, 1965) is an American independent filmmaker and author. He has directed two feature films, Loanshark (1999) and Hell to Pay (2014), as well as, an assortment of short films and documentaries. Jennings uses handheld cameras and cinéma vérité techniques, shooting his films among old Hollywood buildings and streets.

== Early life ==
Jennings was born in Hollywood, California. He grew up making Super-8 movies and screening them for friends and family. He graduated from Beverly Hills High School and then attended film courses at Columbia College Hollywood (CCH), UCLA, and the American Film Institute.

== Career ==
Jennings writes, directs, produces, and composes the music for his films. He uses digital movie cameras and adds a grainy film look during the editing process. He shoots low-budget films, mostly without permits in a style called guerrilla filmmaking. Film columnist David Del Valle referred to Jennings as a "maverick filmmaker."

In 1999, Jennings directed his first feature Loanshark, a drama which the Los Angeles Times considered the "Best Bet" for film when it premiered at the Vogue Theatre on Hollywood Boulevard. Loanshark also screened at several film festivals in 2000, including Silver Lake, South by Southwest, Santa Monica, and Melbourne Underground. The film depicts the stressful life of a ruthless loan shark who drives around the streets of Hollywood looking for people who owe him money.

In 2005, Jennings directed The Weird Museum, a documentary about a circus-like freak show which was located in Hollywood for many years. The documentary was shot just weeks before the museum closed in 1995 and is believed to be the only existing footage of the exhibits. The film screened at the TromaDance Film Festival.

Jennings wrote and directed The Drowning in 2013, an ambitious and fascinating short film about a father who loses his son in a swimming pool drowning after receiving a bizarre warning from a street preacher. The film is constructed with a design that feels almost otherworldly.

In 2014, Jennings directed his second feature Hell to Pay which was a loose remake of Loanshark. The film tells the story of a debt collector with a penchant for violence who dares to cross his boss.

== Author ==
Jennings is also an amusement park historian. In August 2009, his first book, Knott's Berry Farm: The Early Years, was published by Arcadia Publishing and features over 200 rare photographs that haven't been widely circulated. The book goes into great detail in describing the history of Knott's Berry Farm and its founder, Walter Knott, including chapters about the park's Ghost Town, its attractions, street performers, and shops. As of 2006, Jennings has been curator of The Knott's Berry Farm Museum, home to the largest collection of vintage Knott's memorabilia in the world. A copy of his book is housed in the Library of Congress.

In August 2012, Jennings' second book, Beverly Park: L.A.'s Kiddieland, 1943-74, was published by Retro Image Publishing and features 175 never-before-published photographs. The book tells the story of Beverly Park (also known as 'Kiddieland') and its owner Dave Bradley, who was a ride inventor and pioneer in the amusement park industry. There are also chapters dedicated to all the kiddie rides, attractions, grounds, and party areas that made the park so popular for over 30 years. Beverly Ponyland, a place where children rode ponies around a track for 34 years and was located down the street from Beverly Park, is also covered in the book.

In January 2019, Jennings' third book, Bob McAllister's Wonderama, was published, which chronicles the history of the popular, children's TV show from the 1960s and 70s.

== Works ==
=== Filmography ===
- Loanshark. 1999.
- The Weird Museum. 2005.
- The Drowning. 2013.
- Hell to Pay. 2014.

=== Bibliography ===
- Knott's Berry Farm: The Early Years (2009) (ISBN 978-0-73-856921-5)
- Beverly Park: L.A.'s Kiddieland, 1943-74 (2012) (ISBN 978-1-62-030188-3)
- Bob McAllister's Wonderama (2019) (ISBN 978-1-79-031707-3)

== See also ==
- Beverly Park (amusement park)
