= Silver Lake Film Festival =

Silver Lake Film Festival - Los Angeles Los Feliz Theaters marquee

Silver Lake Film Festival was an American film festival that ran from 2000 to 2007. It was a 501 (c) (3) nonprofit organization established to provide a showcase for cutting-edge independent film, music, digital, and other arts in Los Angeles, California. The Festival was held annually at various venues throughout Los Angeles’ Eastside, showcasing well over 200 narrative features, documentaries and short films. In 2005, in addition to its annual event, SLFF launched a monthly series of short films. The 7th annual edition ran for ten days, May 3–12, 2007.

== Programming ==
In its sixth year (2006), Silver Lake Film Festival debuted MP4Fest: curated by Saskia Wilson-Brown and David Burns, MP4Fest provided another parallel festival devoted exclusively to digital content and, specifically, movies made for viewing online and on handheld devices, such as cellphones, PDAs and game players.

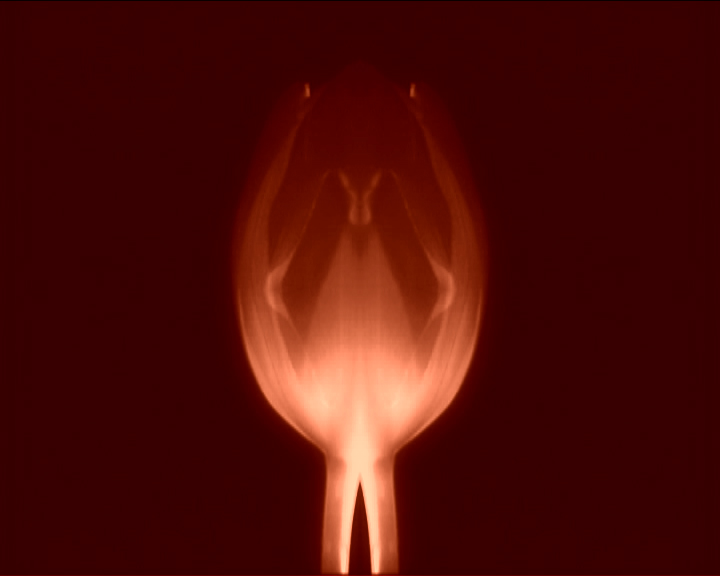
Open Architecture exhibition at LACE, for MP4Fest
