= Scottish Rite Temple (Santa Fe, New Mexico) =

- Scottish Rite Cathedral
- U.S. National Register of Historic Places
- NM State Register of Cultural Properties
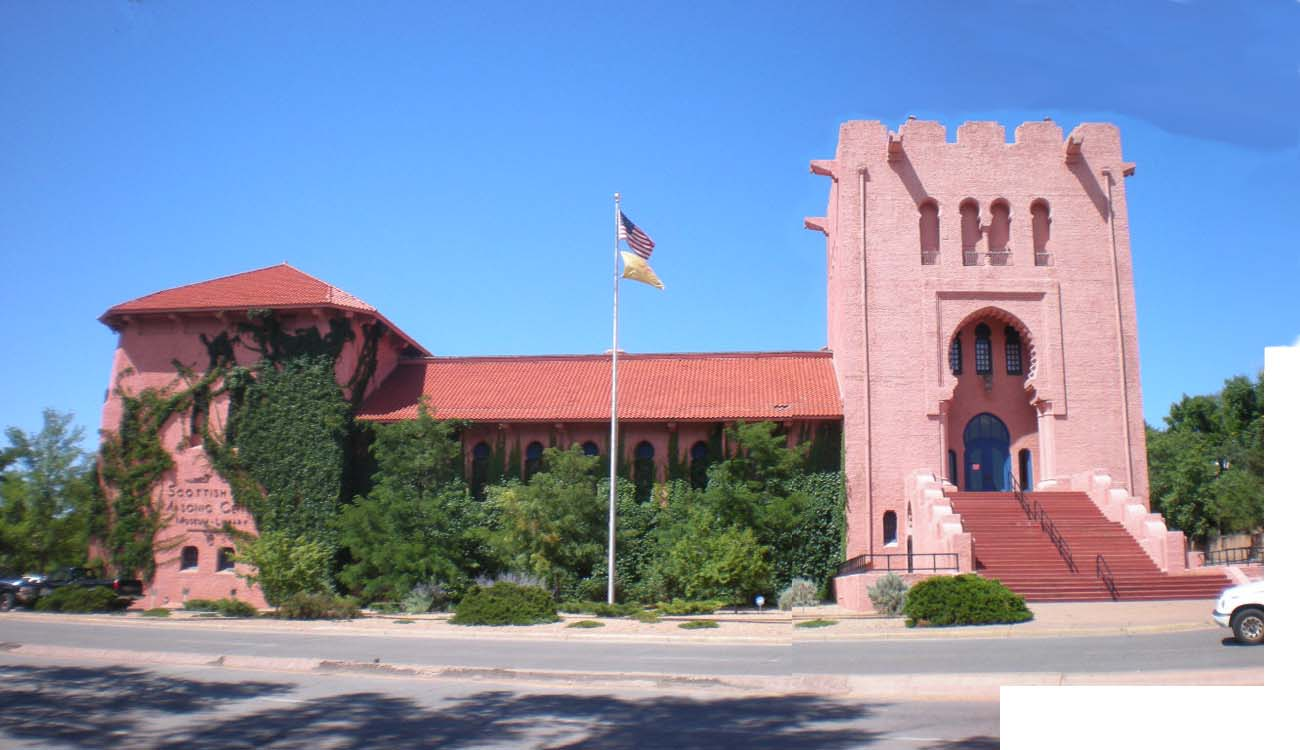

- Location within New Mexico Location within the United States
- Location: 463 Paseo de Peralta, Santa Fe, New Mexico
- Coordinates: 35°41′30″N 105°56′9″W
- Area: 2 acres (0.81 ha)
- Built: 1911
- Architect: Hunt and Burns, C. H. Martindale
- Architectural style: Moorish Revival
- NRHP reference No.: 87000424
- NMSRCP No.: 924

Significant dates
- Added to NRHP: March 13, 1987
- Designated NMSRCP: July 8, 1983

The Scottish Rite Temple, also known as Scottish Rite Cathedral or Santa Fe Lodge of Perfection, in Santa Fe, New Mexico was begun in 1911 and completed in 1912. It was a filming location for the 2016 Tina Fey film Whiskey Tango Foxtrot.

In 1909 Santa Fe's paper, The Daily New Mexican, announced that local (he lived and had offices in both New Mexico and Colorado) architect Isaac H. Rapp had been awarded the commission to design a new Scottish Rite Cathedral. A few months later, in July of the same year, it printed a perspective by Rapp showing a grand Neo-classical styled design for the Temple. Only a week later the same paper printed that Rapp's plans had been considered to be "not satisfactory".

Shortly afterwards it was announced that the Los Angeles architectural firm of Hunt and Burns had been employed instead. They produced a Moorish Revival style structure based loosely on one of the gatehouses to the Court of the Lions at the Alhambra in Spain. Sumner P. Hunt and Silas Reese Burns were well known for their designs in the California Spanish Mission Revival architecture style, but decided instead to base their design on a connection between the Spanish building tradition of New Mexico and that of the Moors in southern Spain. There are also obvious similarities with the Southwest Museum, in Los Angeles, which was being designed by Hunt and Burns around the same time, including the tower, without the Islamic entry.

The building was clad in pink colored stucco which remains as of 2026.

That Isaac Rapp did not get the commission was not a huge loss to him as he was to build his design in 1913 as the Las Animas County Court House, in Trinidad, Colorado. Also, that he did not design the building that was ultimately built was apparently missed by some, as he has been erroneously listed as the architect of the building.

It was used historically as a clubhouse. The building was listed on the National Register of Historic Places in 1987.

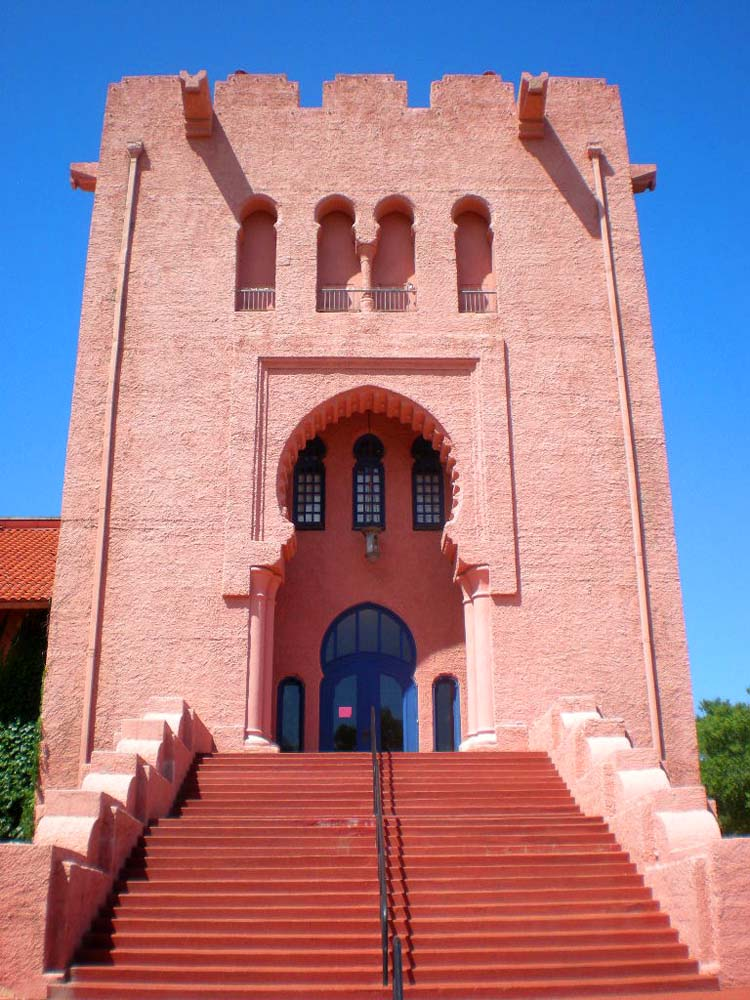

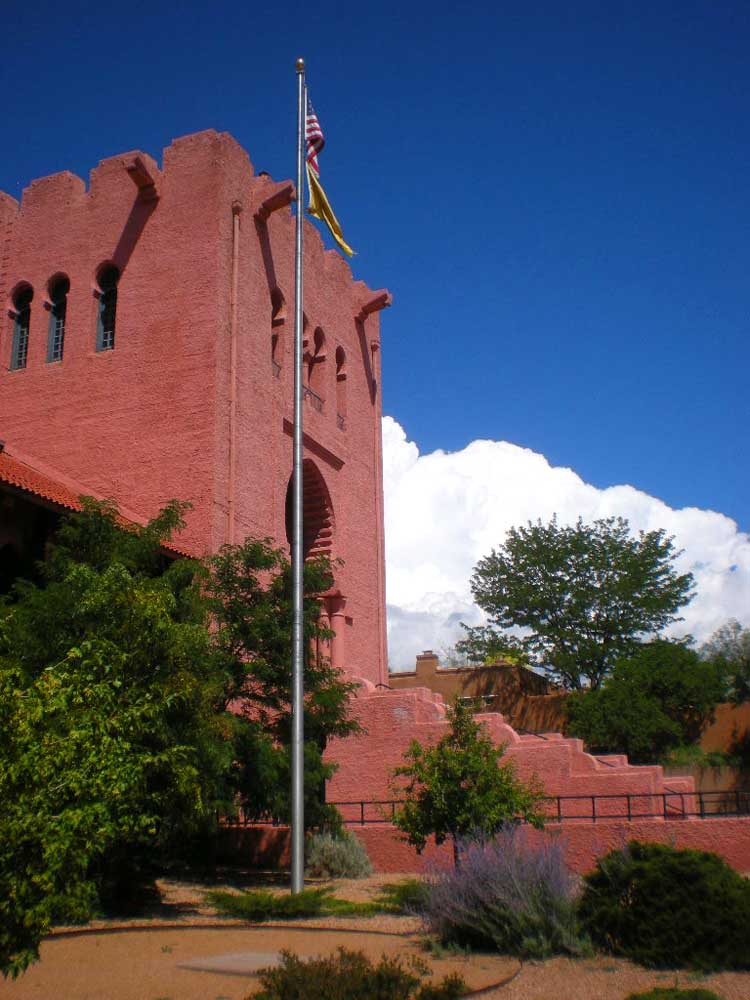

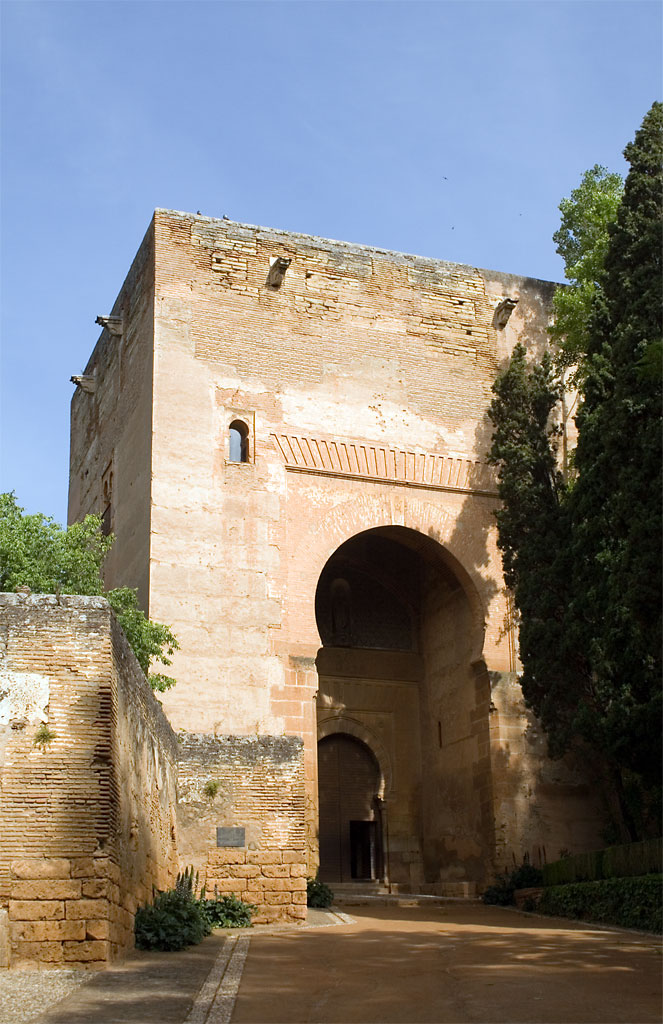
Alhamba gatehouse

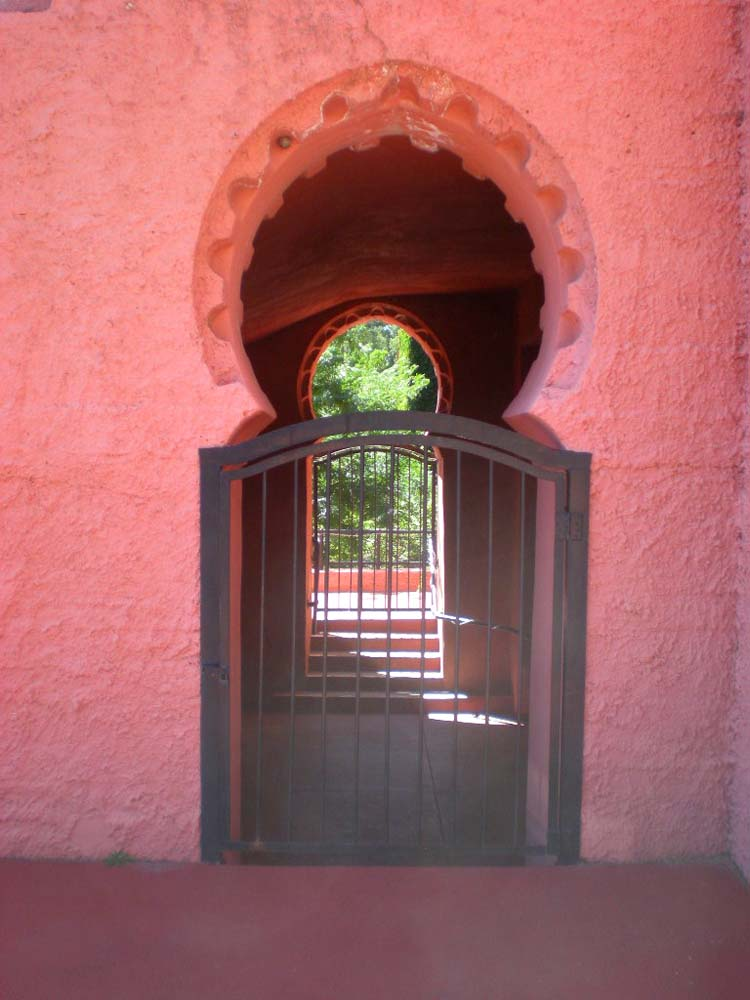

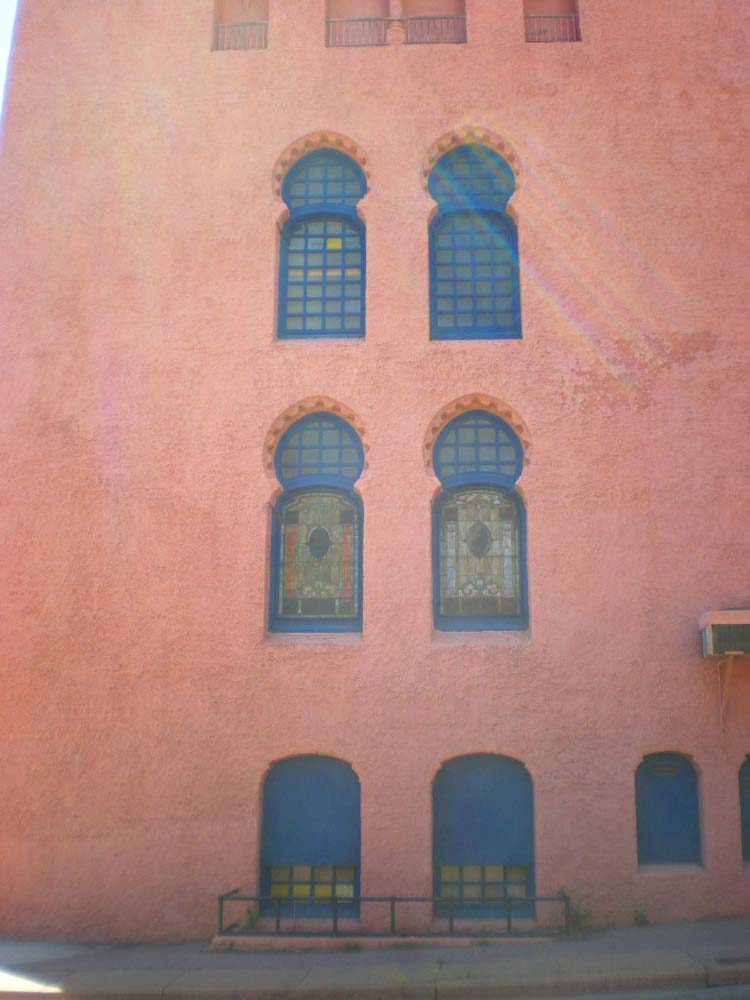

== See also ==
- National Register of Historic Places listings in Santa Fe County, New Mexico
