= Menlo Avenue–West Twenty-ninth Street Historic District =

Historic district in California, United States

- U.S. National Register of Historic Places
- U.S. Historic district
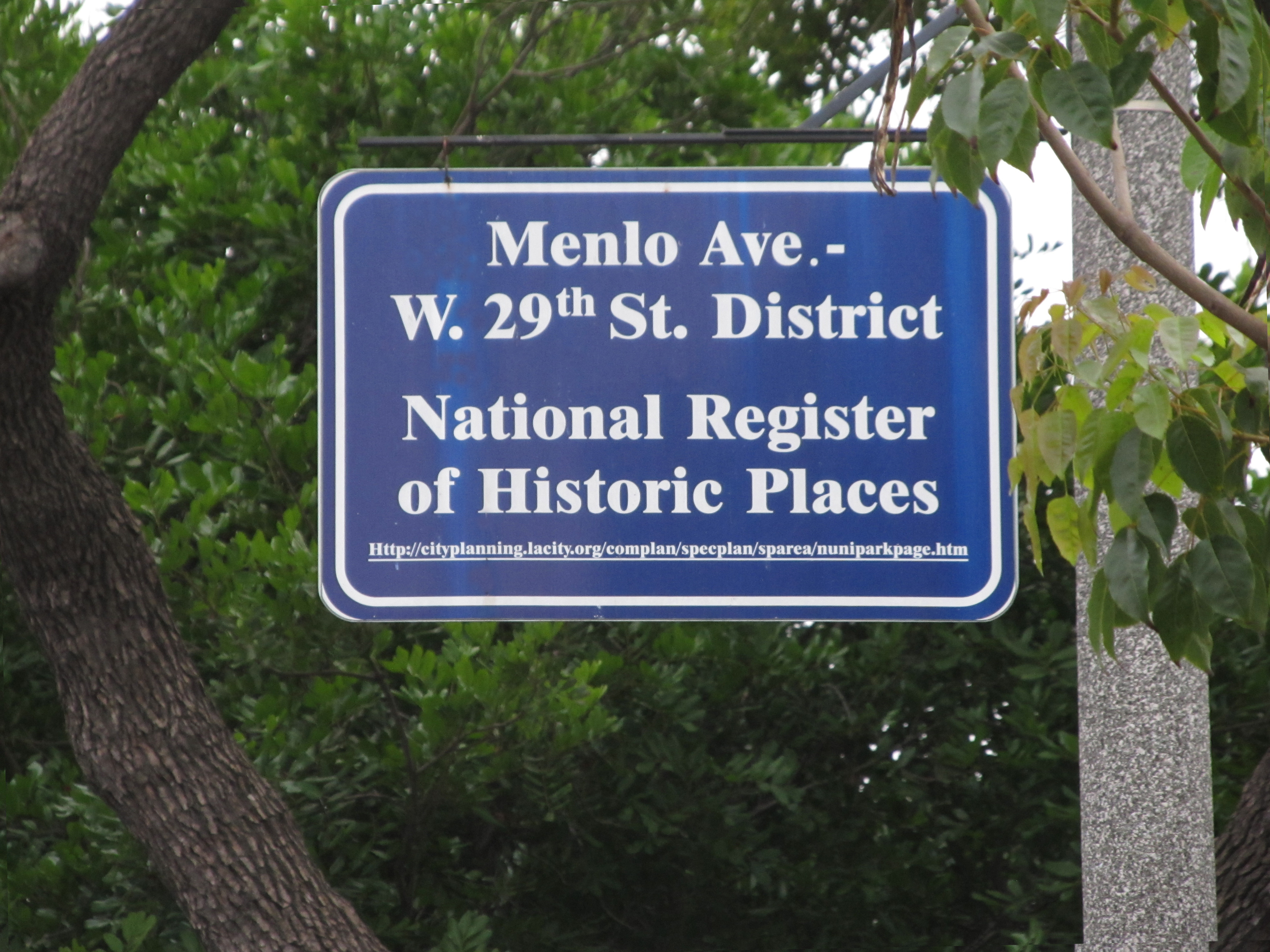
- Signage on Menlo Avenue between Adams Boulevard & 29th Street

- Location within Los Angeles
- Location: West Adams, Los Angeles
- Coordinates: 34°1′48″N 118°17′20″W
- Built: 1896
- Architect: Multiple
- Architectural style: Colonial Revival, Bungalow/Craftsman, Late Victorian
- NRHP reference No.: 87000139
- Added to NRHP: February 12, 1987

The Menlo Avenue–West Twenty-ninth Street Historic District is a historic district in the North University Park neighborhood of Los Angeles, which is itself part of the city's West Adams district. The area consists of late Victorian and Craftsman-style homes dating back to 1896. The area is bounded by West Adams Boulevard on the north, Ellendale on the east, West Thirtieth Street on the south, and Vermont Avenue to the west. The district is noted for its well-preserved period architecture, reflecting the transition from late Victorian and shingle-styles to the American Craftsman style that took hold in Southern California in the early 1900s. The district was added to the National Register of Historic Places in 1987.

== Houses of the district ==
There are more than 50 historic homes in the Menlo Avenue–West Twenty-ninth Street Historic District, representing a variety of architectural styles from the turn of the 20th century. A sampling of the architecturally significant homes in the district include the following:

- House at 2630 South Menlo Avenue — This 2 1/2-story Craftsman-style house, built in approximately 1899, is characterized by its asymmetrical facade and its medium-pitched gable roof. The house has been altered by partial enclosure of the porch and a change of use to a boarding house.
- House at 2631 South Menlo Avenue — This 2 1/2-story Craftsman-style home was built in approximately 1903. It is built with a square plan and has Tudor detailing. The exterior walls are of cut stone on the first floor and shingles on the second floor. Its stone facing and Tudor details add to the diversity of the transitional Craftsman residences in the district.
- House at 2643 South Menlo Avenue — This large, 4,186-square-foot (388.9 m^{2}), 2 1/2-story house was built in 1903 and designed by the prominent architectural firm of Hunt and Eager (Sumner Hunt and Abraham Wesley Eager). It has a square shape and is influenced by the Classical Revival style. The steep-pitched truncated roof is topped with a balustrade of turned spindles.

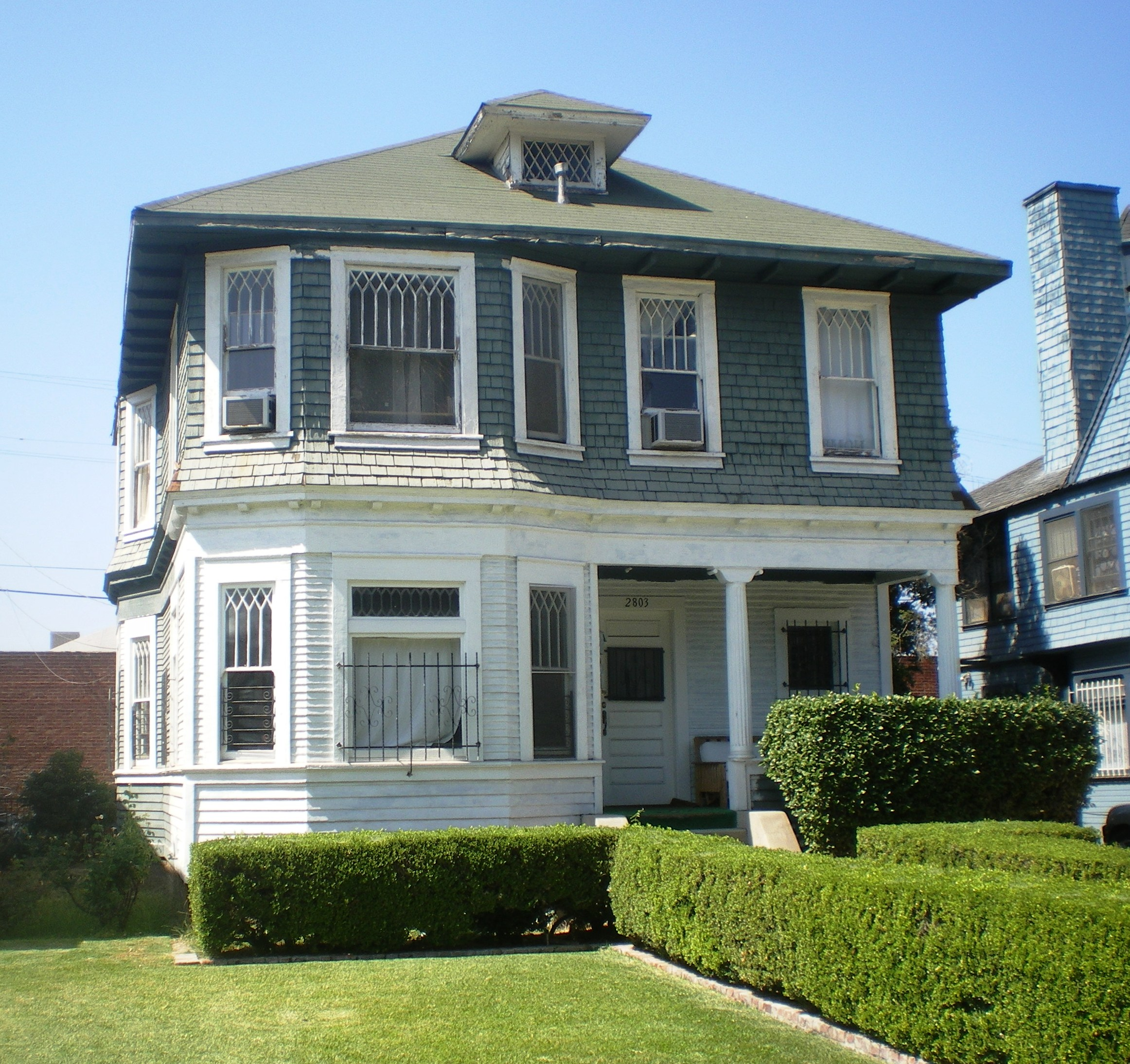
2803 S. Menlo Ave.

- House at 2646 South Menlo Avenue — This two-story house has been described as having an irregular and eclectic design. It was built by William F. West in approximately 1897.
- House at 2663 South Menlo Avenue — This 2 1/2-story transitional Craftsman house was built in approximately 1896. It is an example of the Tudor influence on the transitional Craftsman style. It has a generally symmetrical facade with a steep-pitched gable roof and slant oriel windows. It was converted to apartments in 1920, and alterations include enclosure of the outer end of the porch, additional of four rear porches, and extensive interior changes to convert the structure into multi-family housing.
- House at 2666 South Menlo Avenue — This 2 1/2-story house, built in approximately 1897, is an irregular and transitional design that has been described as having elements of Craftsman, shingle and Richardsonian influences.
- House at 2679 South Menlo Avenue — This two-story residence, built in approximately 1901, is said to be an example of the "Classic Box" design. The 3,314-square-foot (307.9 m^{2}) home has a generally square-shaped plan and is influenced by the Classical style. The original owner was Florence Scarborough, who was a contralto singer who studied music in Italy and was music director at the B'nai B'rith Temple at 9th and Hope Streets. Her husband, James Scarborough, was a lawyer and special counsel to many Los Angeles corporations.
- House at 2706 South Menlo Avenue — This 2 1/2-story house built in 1904 is a good example of the Craftsman-style residence with Alpine chalet elements.

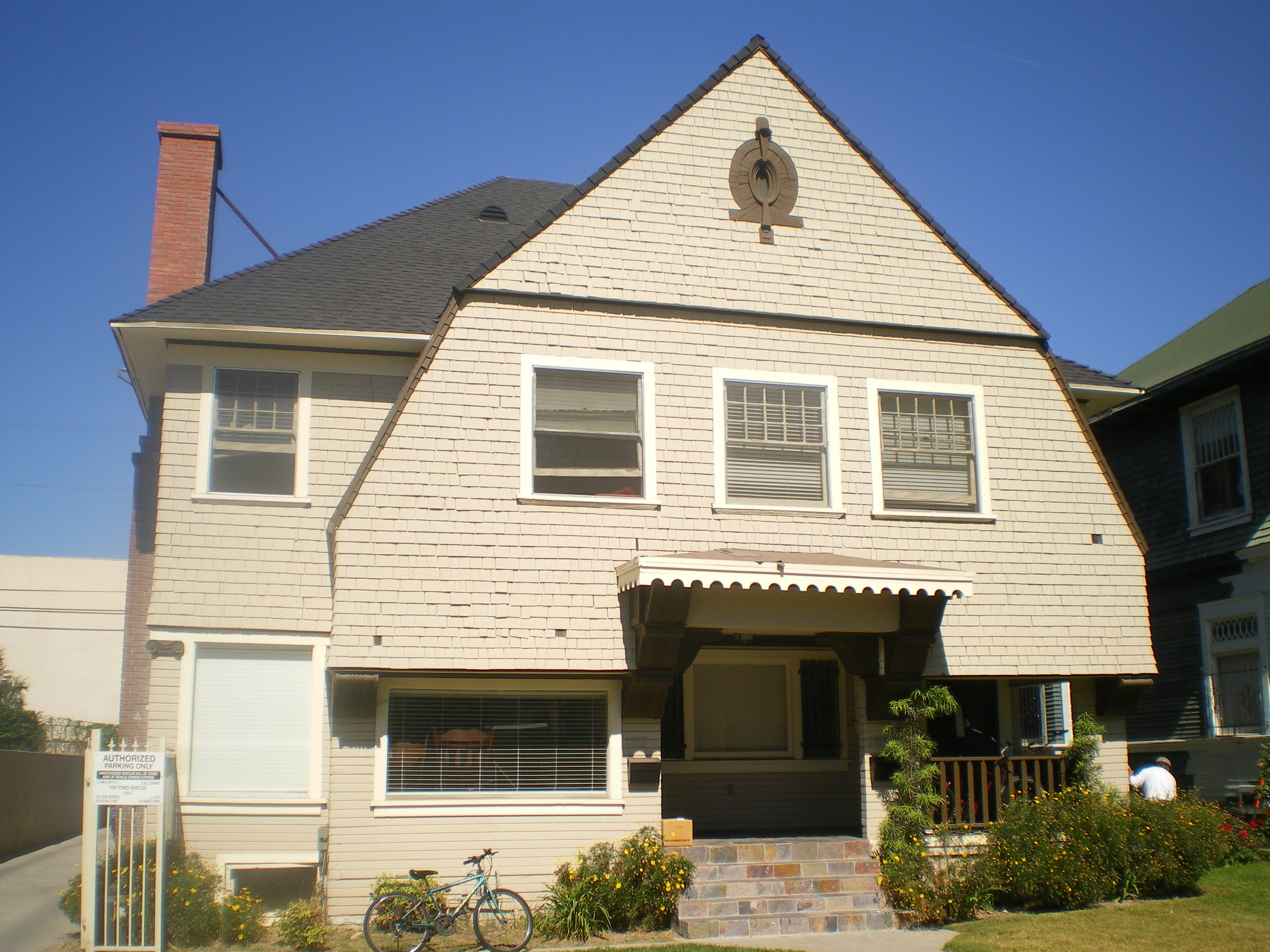
2811–2813 S. Menlo Ave.

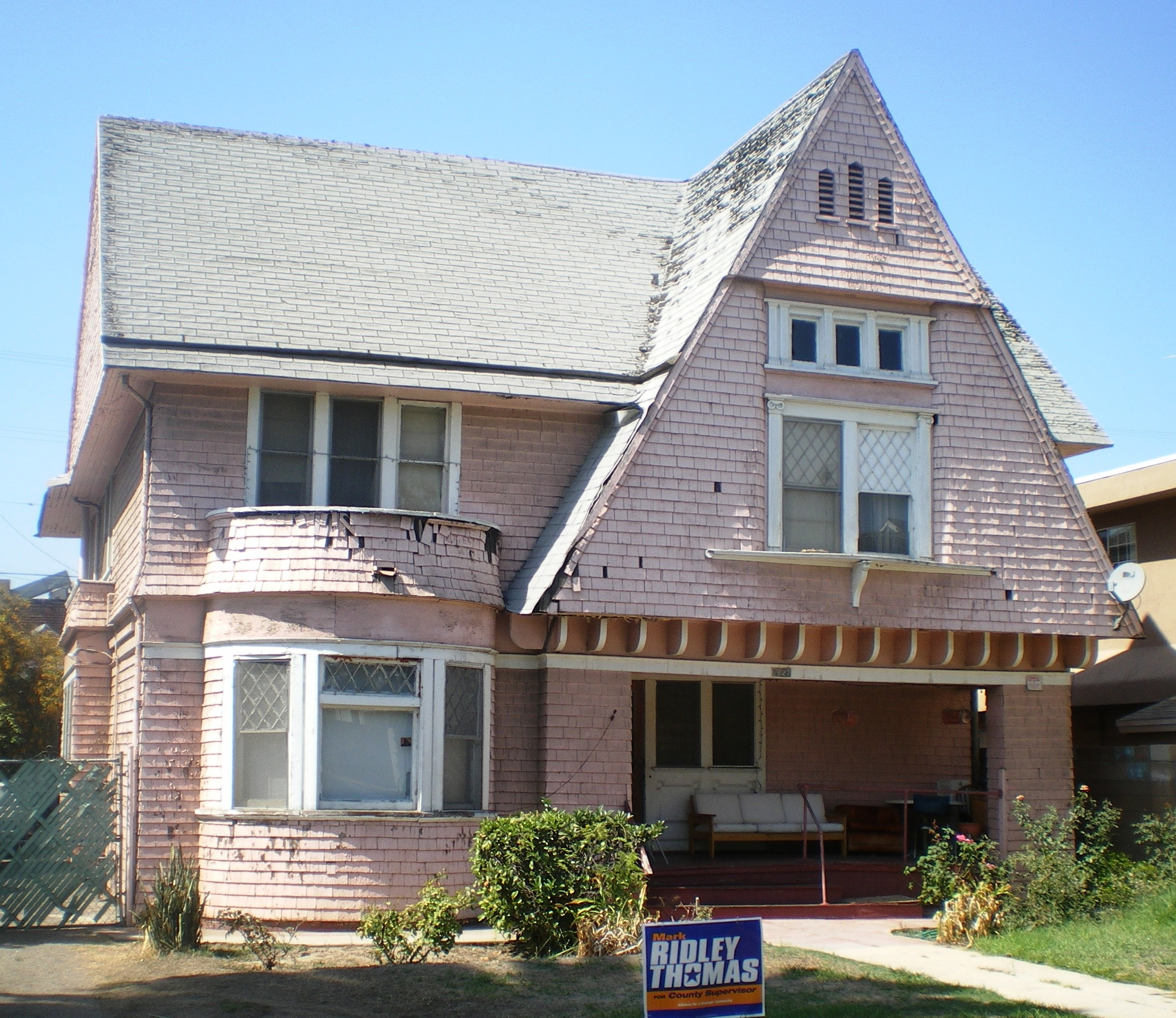
2827 S. Menlo Ave.

- House at 2712 South Menlo Avenue — This two-story residence was built in approximately 1897 and is said to have been influenced by the simplified Classical Revival style. It has an asymmetrical facade and a high-pitched hip roof with flared ends. The building has been altered by enclosure of the front porch.
- House at 2723 South Menlo Avenue — This two-story house is possibly the oldest building on Menlo Avenue, having been built in approximately 1897. It is a good, unaltered example of a Victorian house with Italianate influences. By 1902, it was being used as a boarding house.
- House at 2801 South Menlo Avenue — This two-story residence was built before 1901It has a steep-pitched gable roof, a full-length projecting porch, and round porch columns. Every Nation ministries rented the house for almost two decades, beginning in the 1980s and going through the 2000s.
- House at 2803 South Menlo Avenue — This two-story residence was built in approximately 1897 and is said to be influenced by the shingle-style. It has a pyramidal roof, an inset porch behind two tapered columns, and a two-story slant bay.
- House at 2811–2813 South Menlo Avenue — This two-story residence was built in 1898 and has clapboard walls at the first floor and shingle at the second floor. It has an irregular plan designed in the shingle style. It has a two-story overhanging Dutch gambrel gable that projects from the main plane of the facade and a truncated pyramidal roof. There is a patterned shingle design around the oval roof ventilator in the gable wall. The house was converted into a duplex in 1912.
- House at 2824 South Menlo Avenue — This two-story residence was built prior to 1901 and has been described as having a shingle-style design.
- House at 2827 South Menlo Avenue — This two-story home, built in 1898, is a good example of shingle-style architecture. It has a generally square plan, and its prominent features include a steep pitched gable roof on the right side of the house with the ridge parallel to the front and a prominent front facing gable wall that originates over an inset entrance porch. On the left side of the house, there is a curved first-floor bay topped by a balcony.
- House at 2833 South Menlo Avenue — This two-story house, built in approximately 1899, has an asymmetrical facade with a Dutch gambrel roof and an offset porch with a pediment and classical columns. The original occupant of the home was Jennie V. Mitchell, who was listed in the Pioneers of Beaver Valley and in the Negro Trail Blazers of California.
- House at 2615 Ellendale Place — This two-story Spanish Colonia Revival house was built in approximately 1908. It is located at the corner of Ellendale Place and West Adams Boulevard. It was later converted into a fraternity house for the USC chapter of Alpha Gamma Omega and later became a sorority house.
- House at 2832 Menlo Avenue - This two-story turn of the century brick and wood home was built around 1908, and lies in the historical housing district of South LA. This house was used in several scenes in the 2004 film National Treasure. In 2016, the property was reported by the Los Angeles Neighborhood Watch Annual Report as having the highest number of noise complaints in the 90007 area code.

== Gallery of houses ==
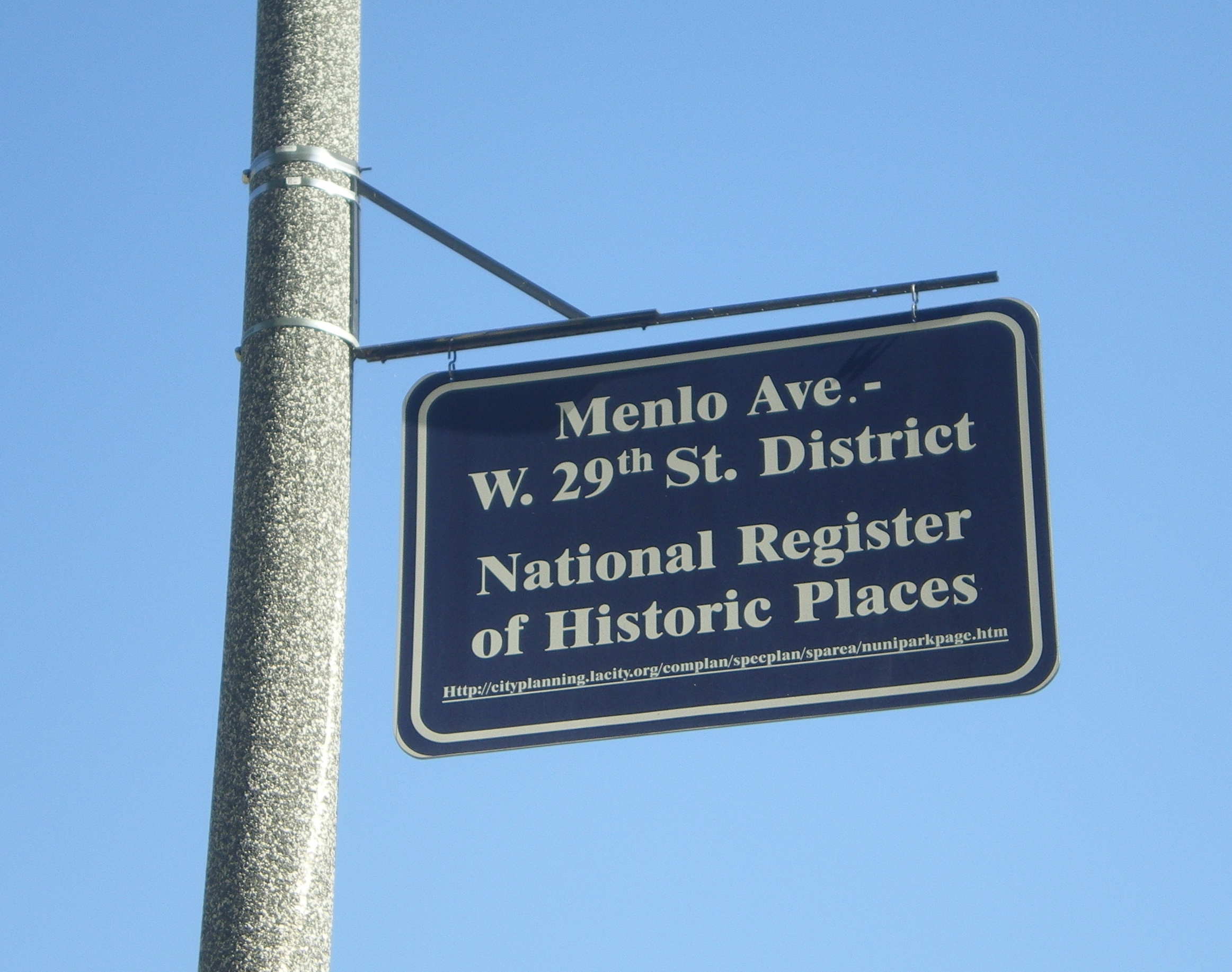
Signage marking the district

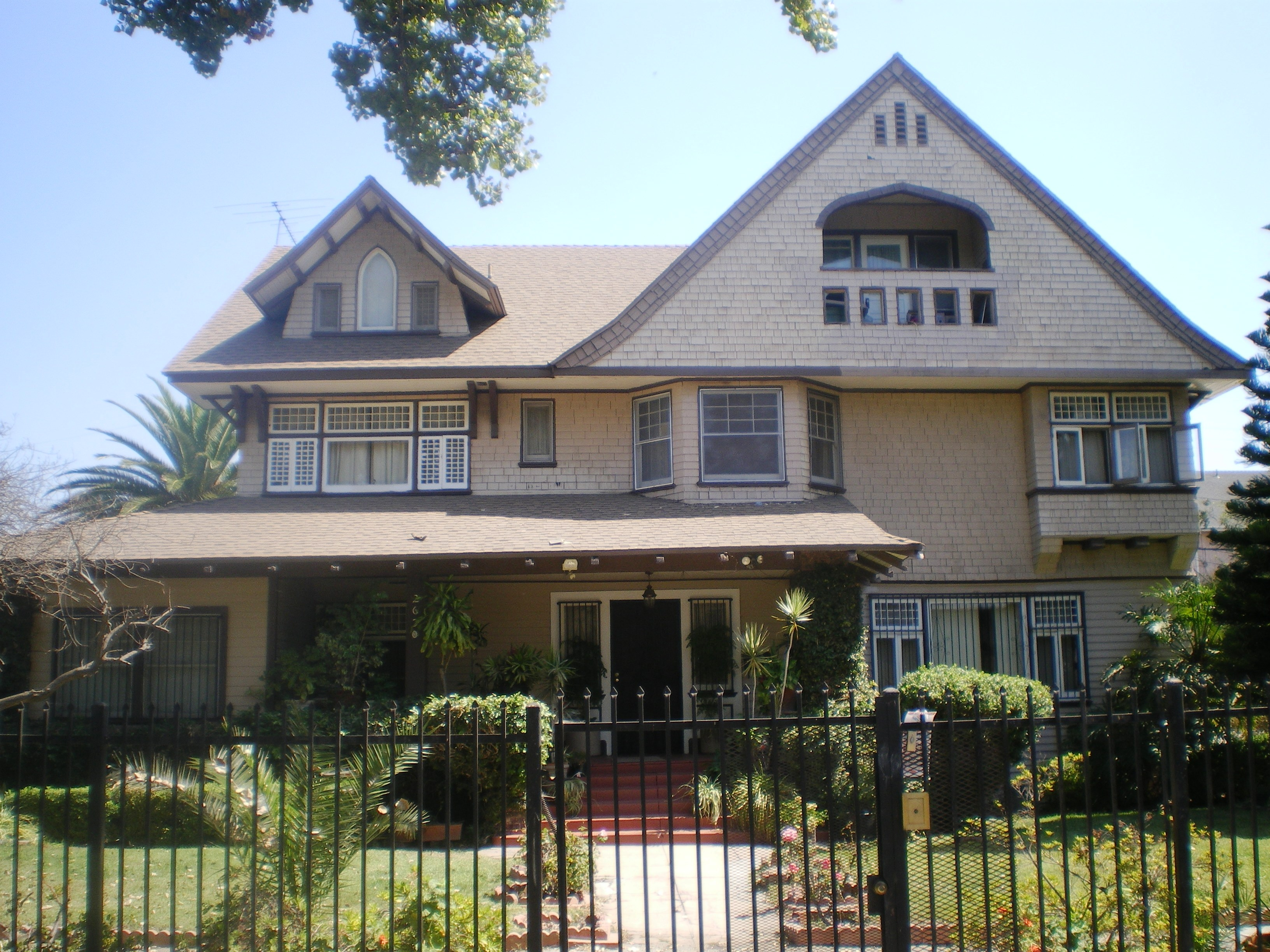
2630 S. Menlo Ave.

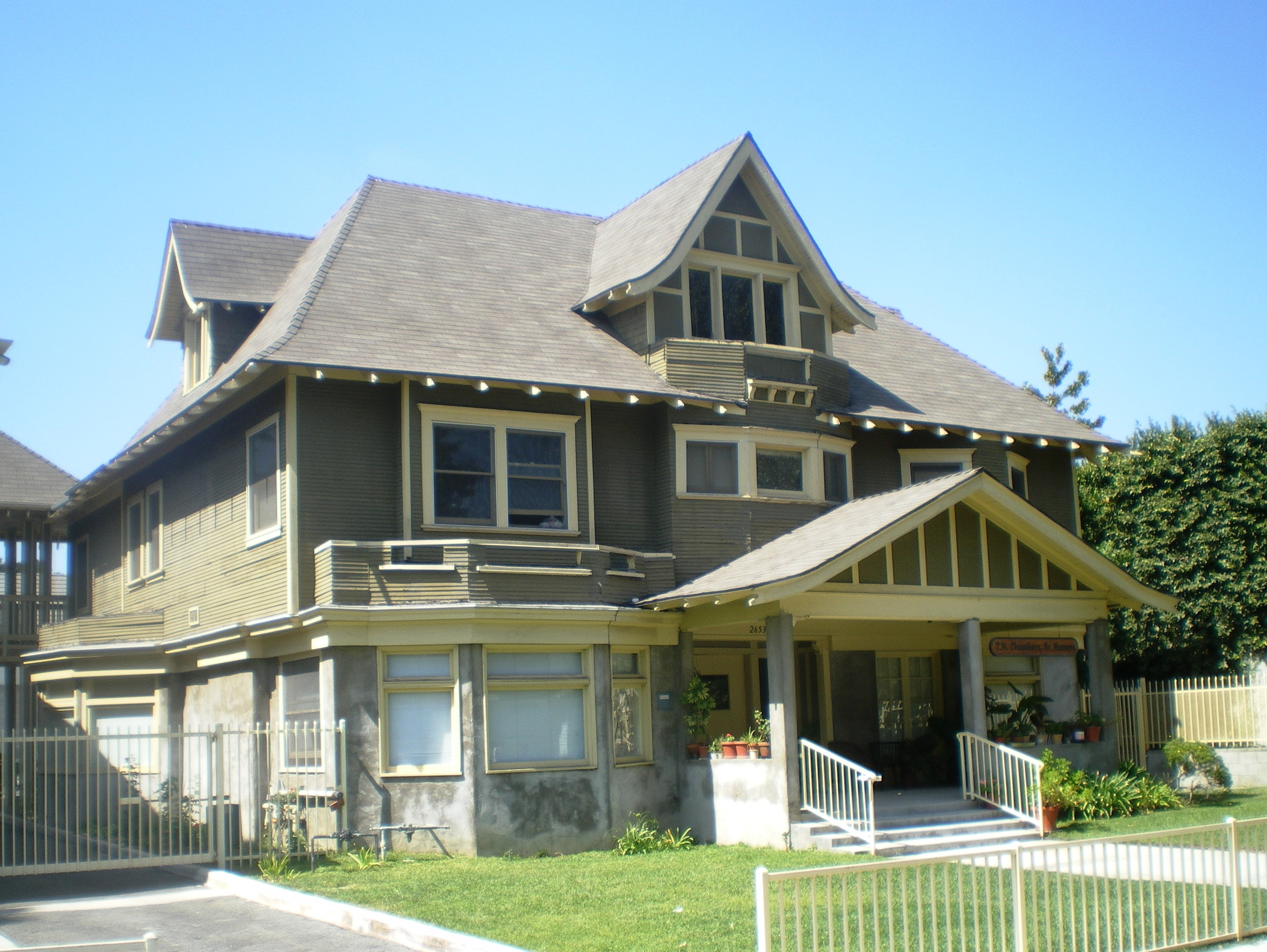
2631 S. Menlo Ave.

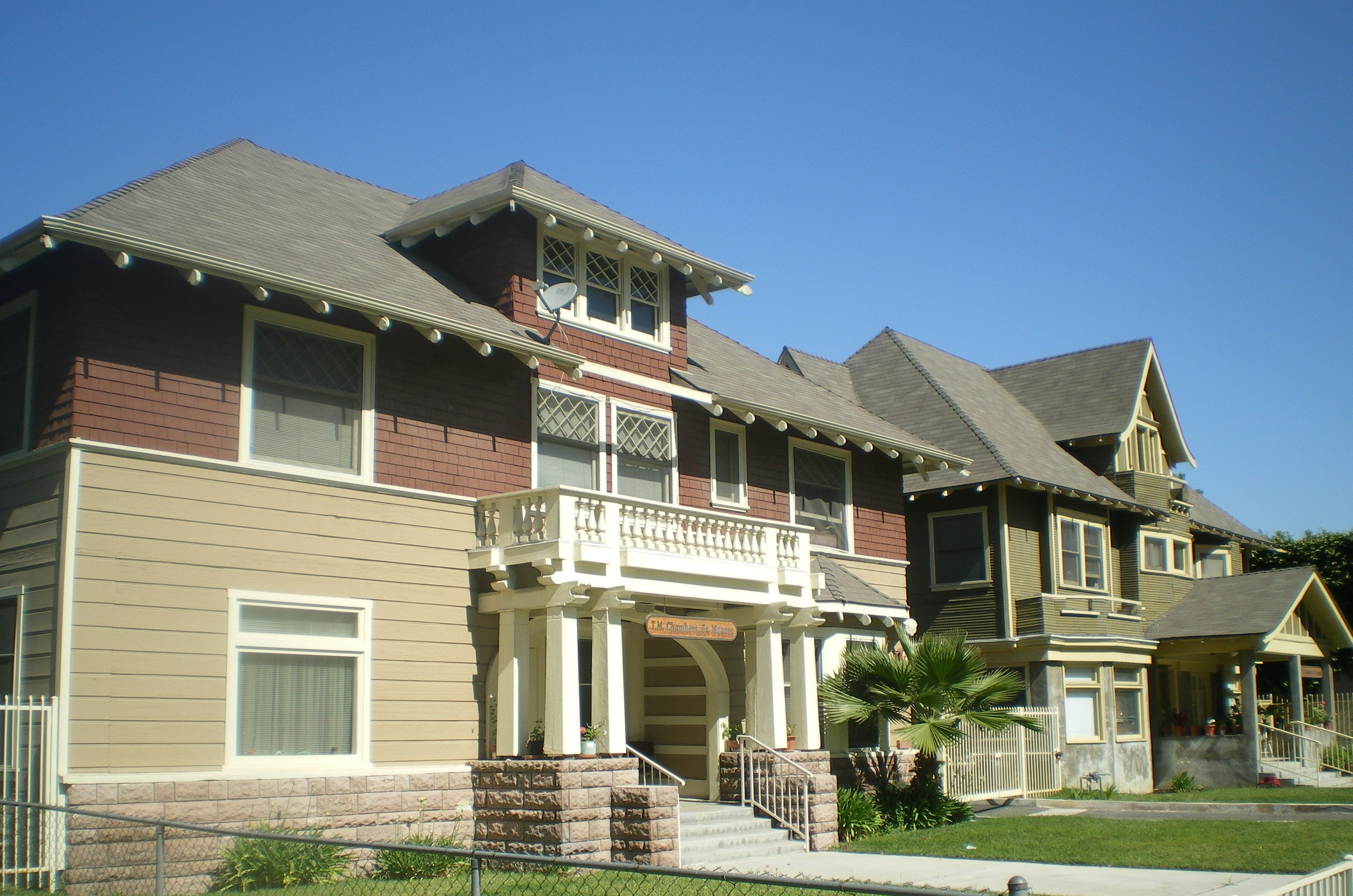
2643 S. Menlo Ave.

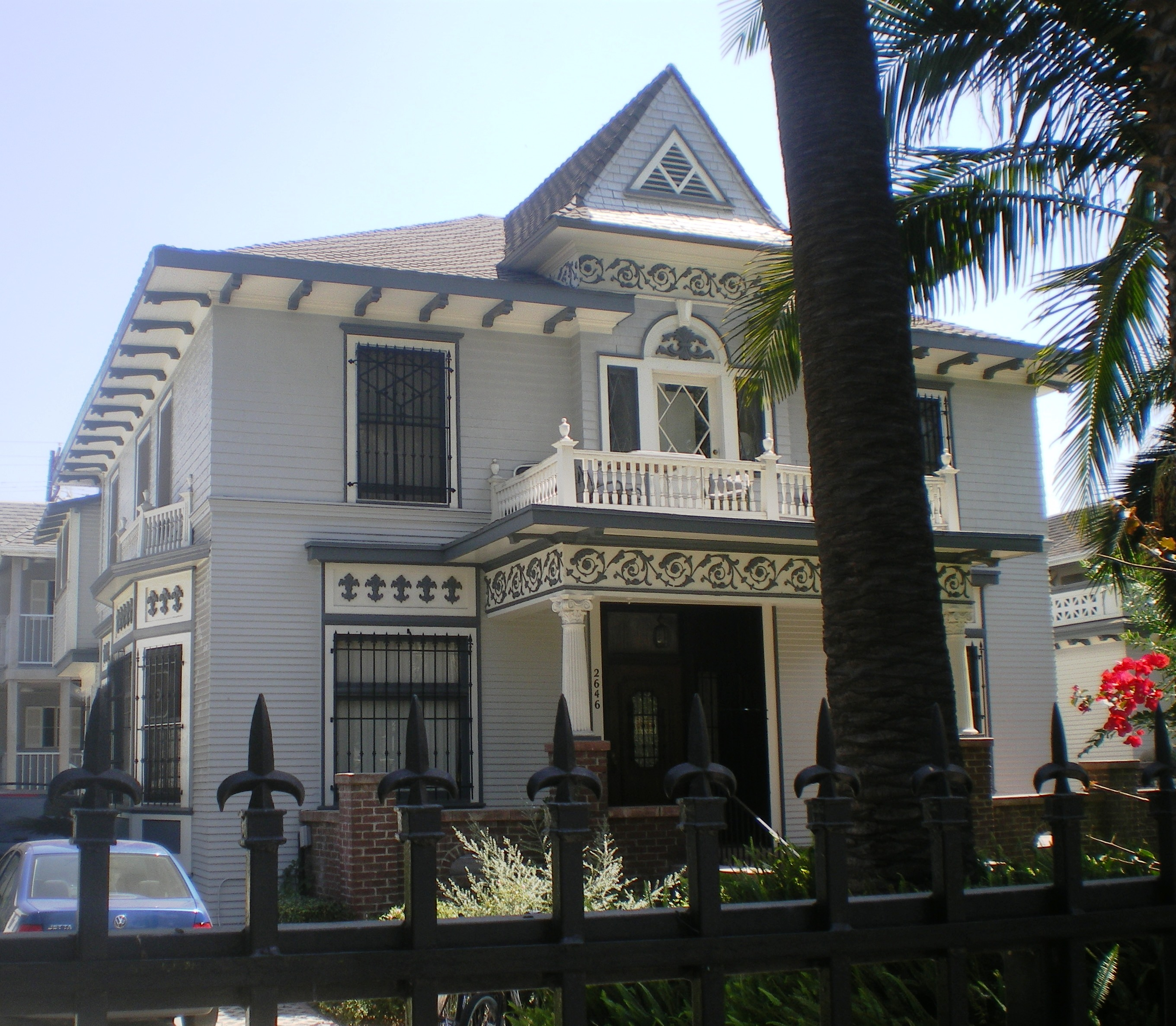
2646 S. Menlo Ave.

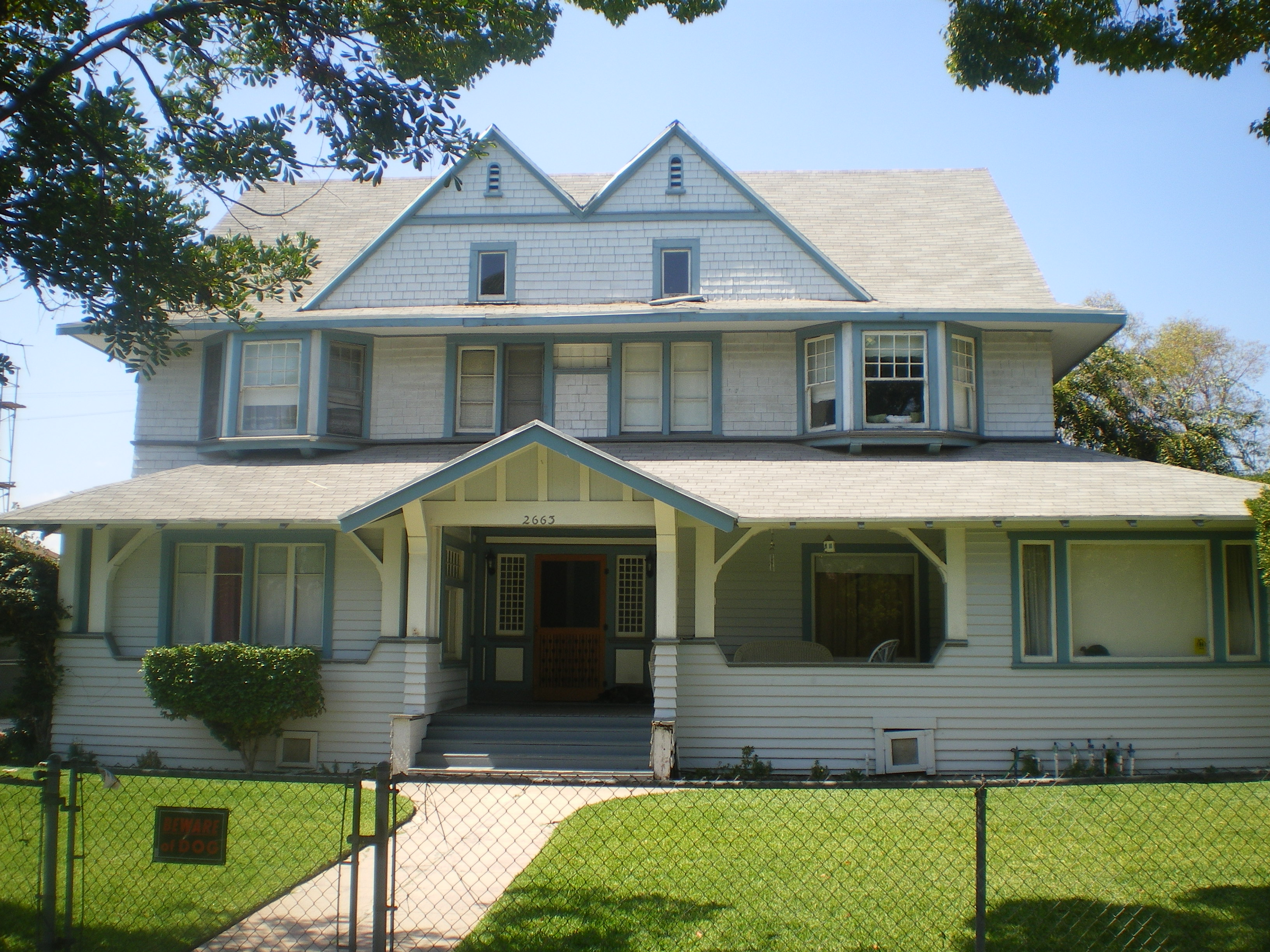
2663 S. Menlo Ave.

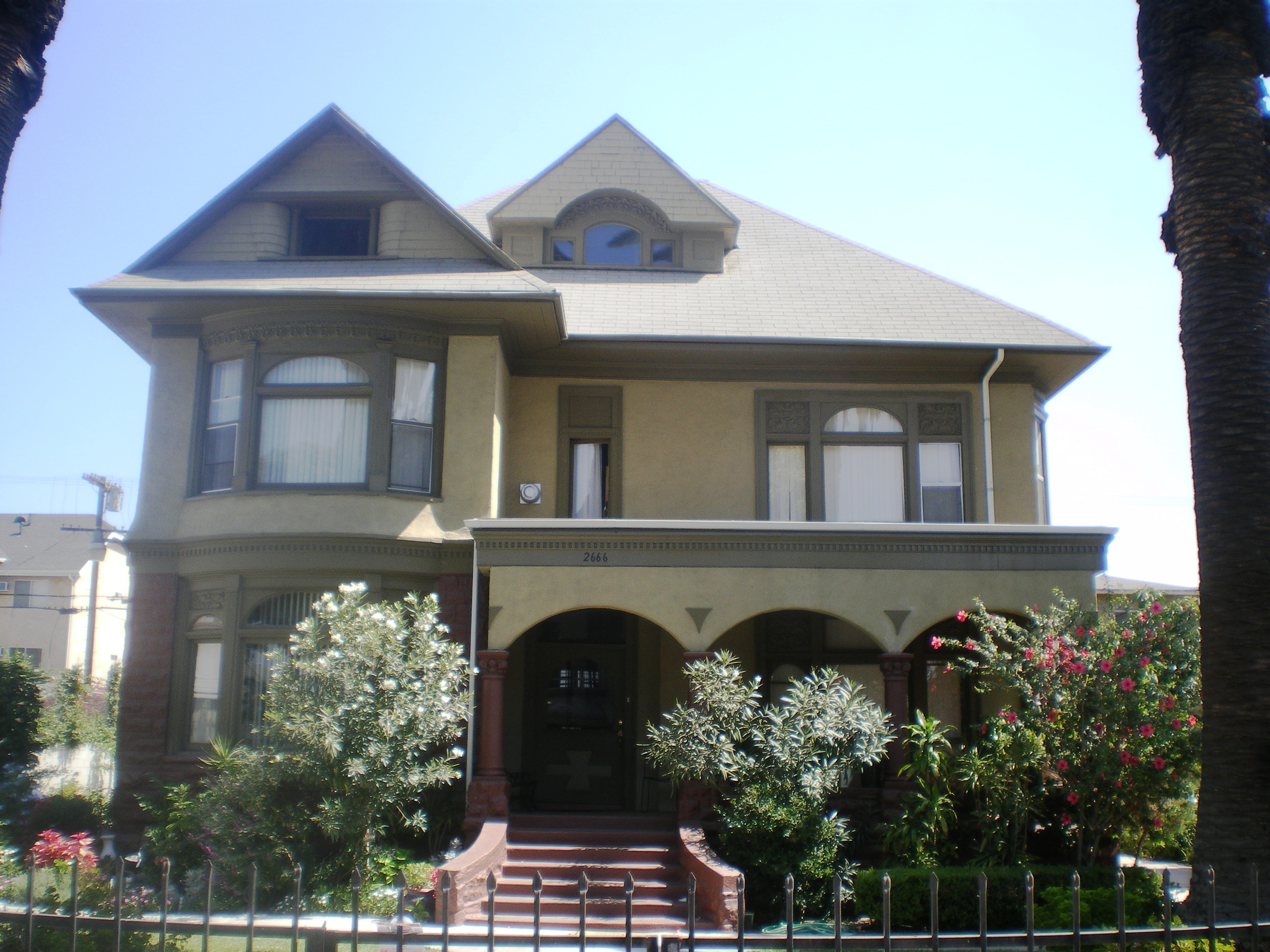
2666 S. Menlo Ave.

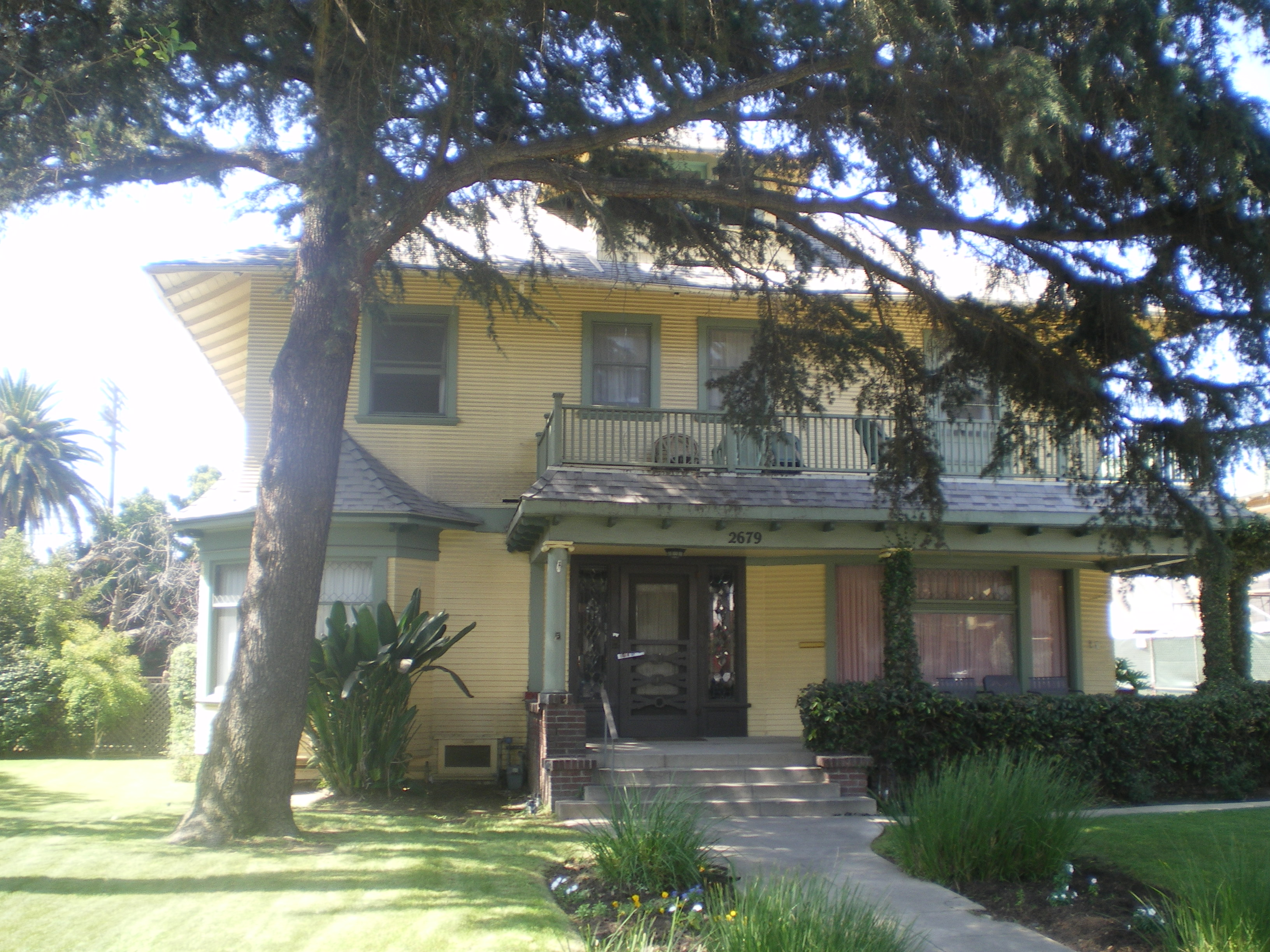
2679 S. Menlo Ave.

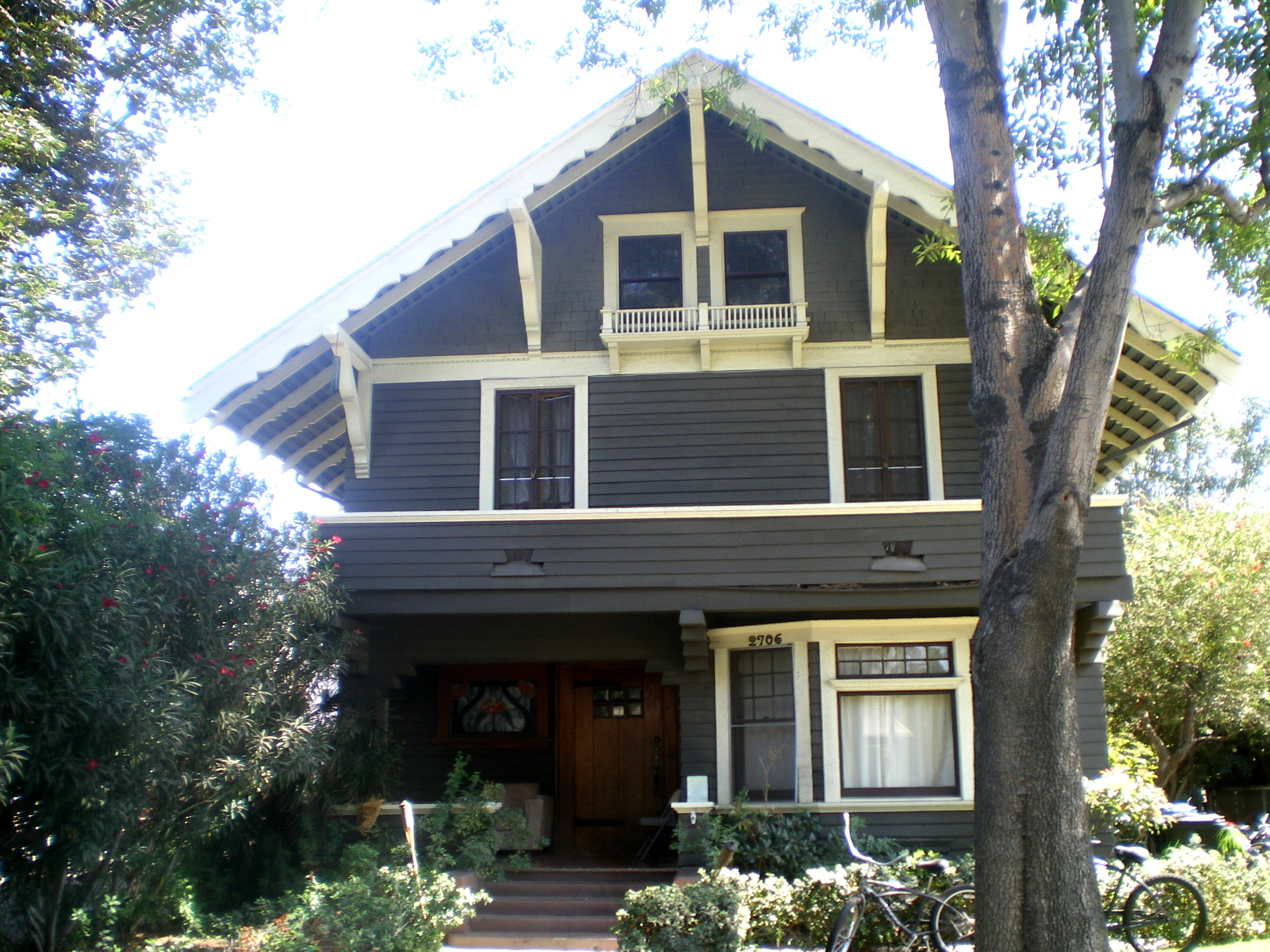
2706 S. Menlo Ave.

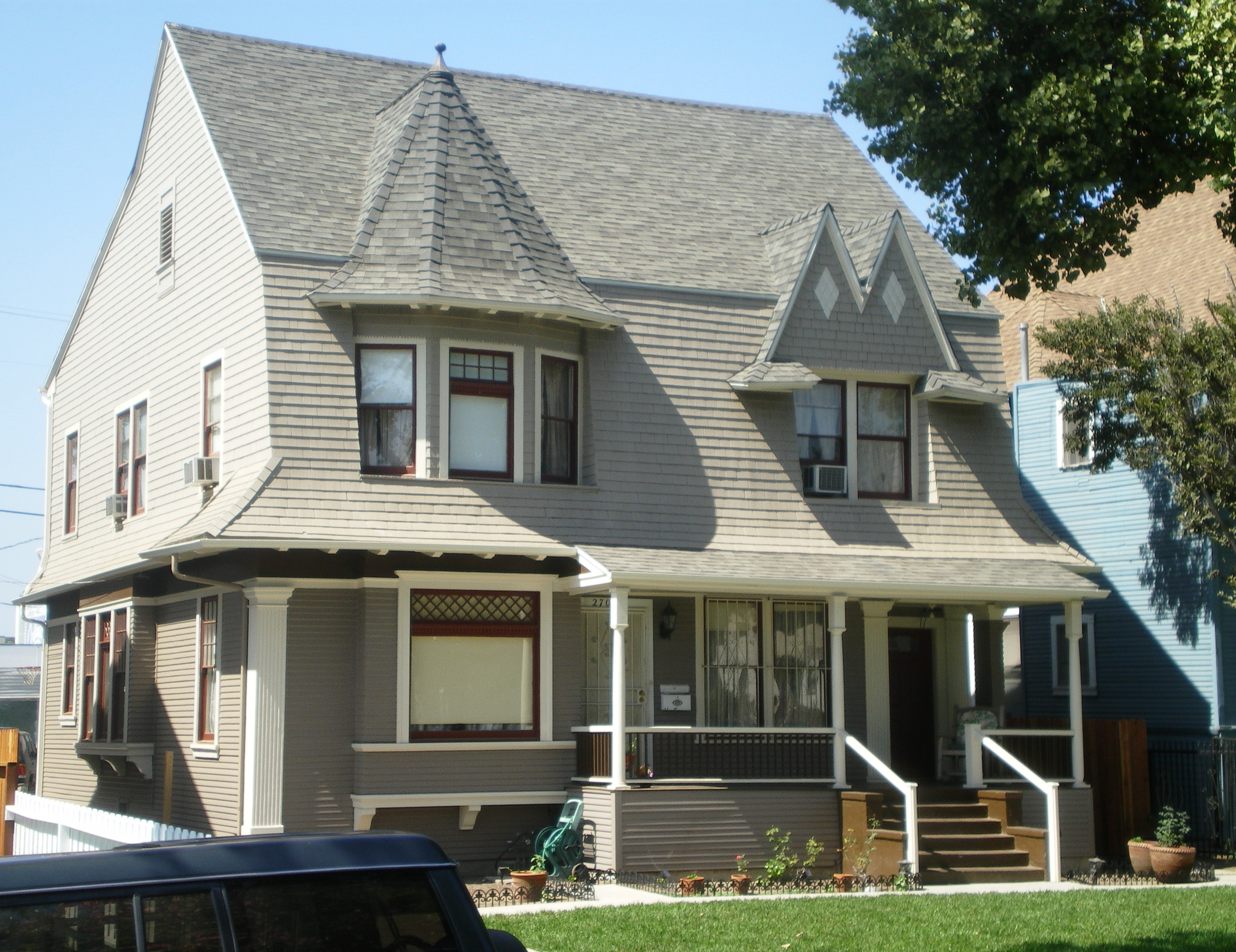
2707–2709 S. Menlo Ave.

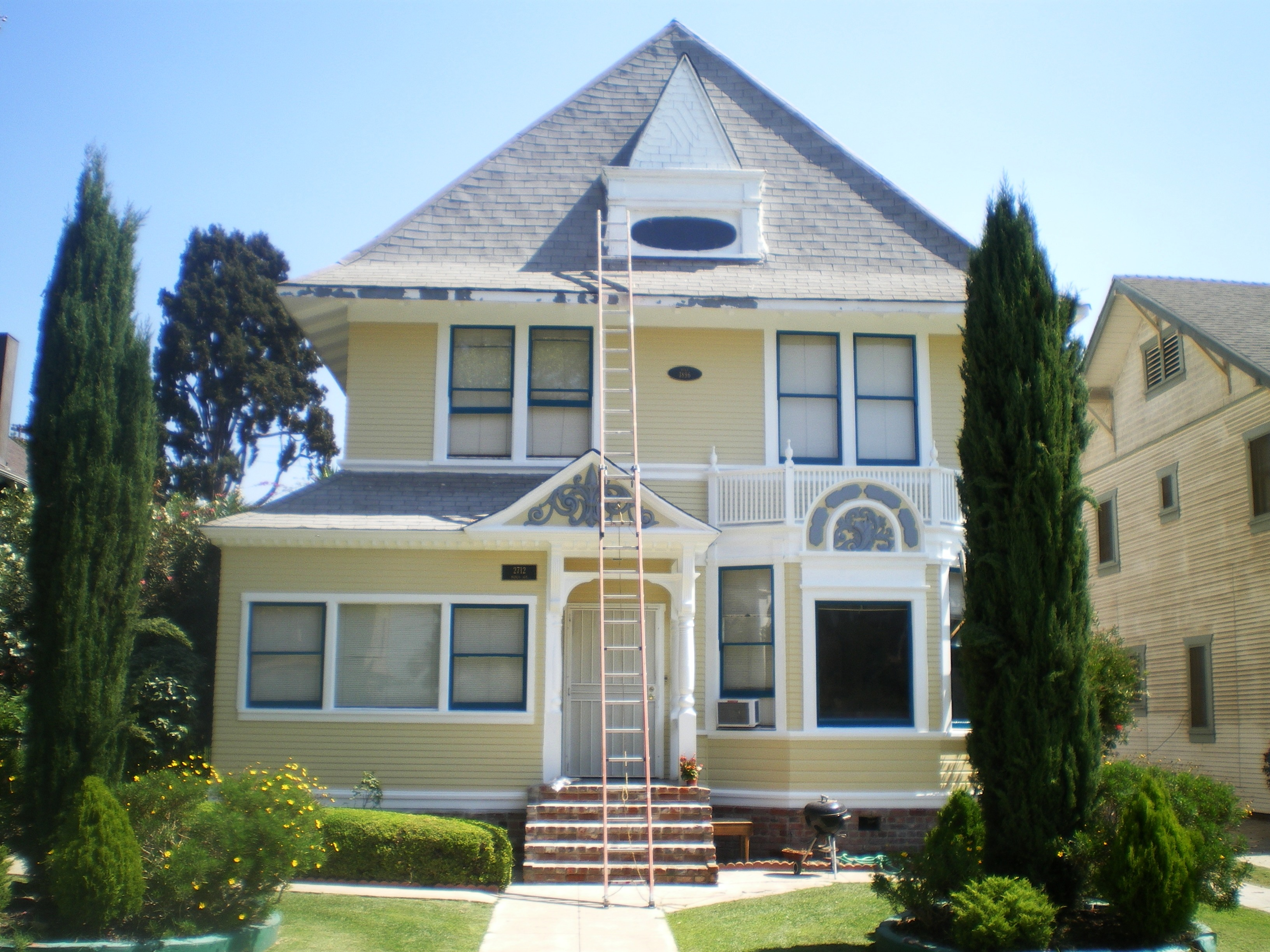
2712 S. Menlo Ave.

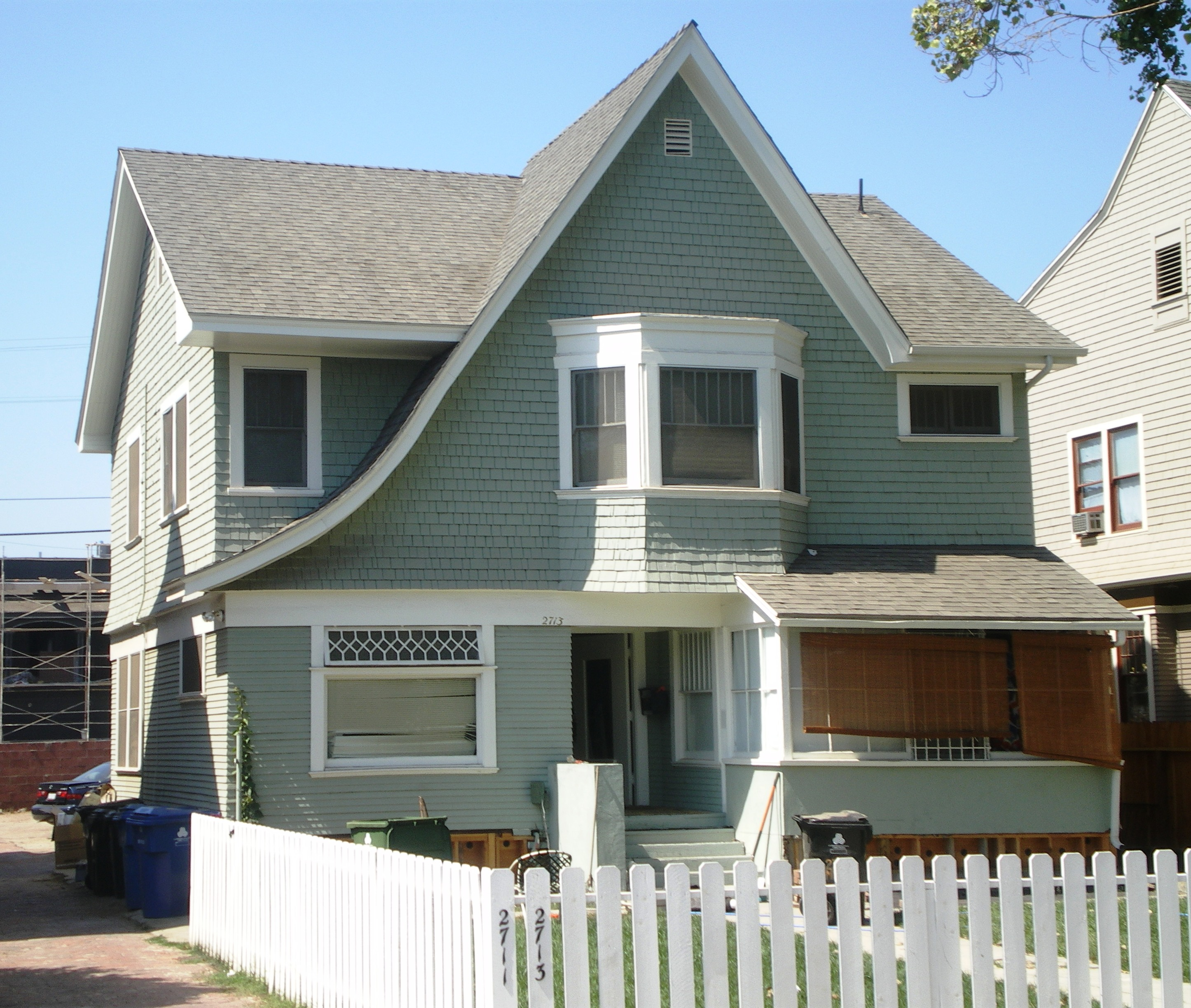
2713 S. Menlo Ave.

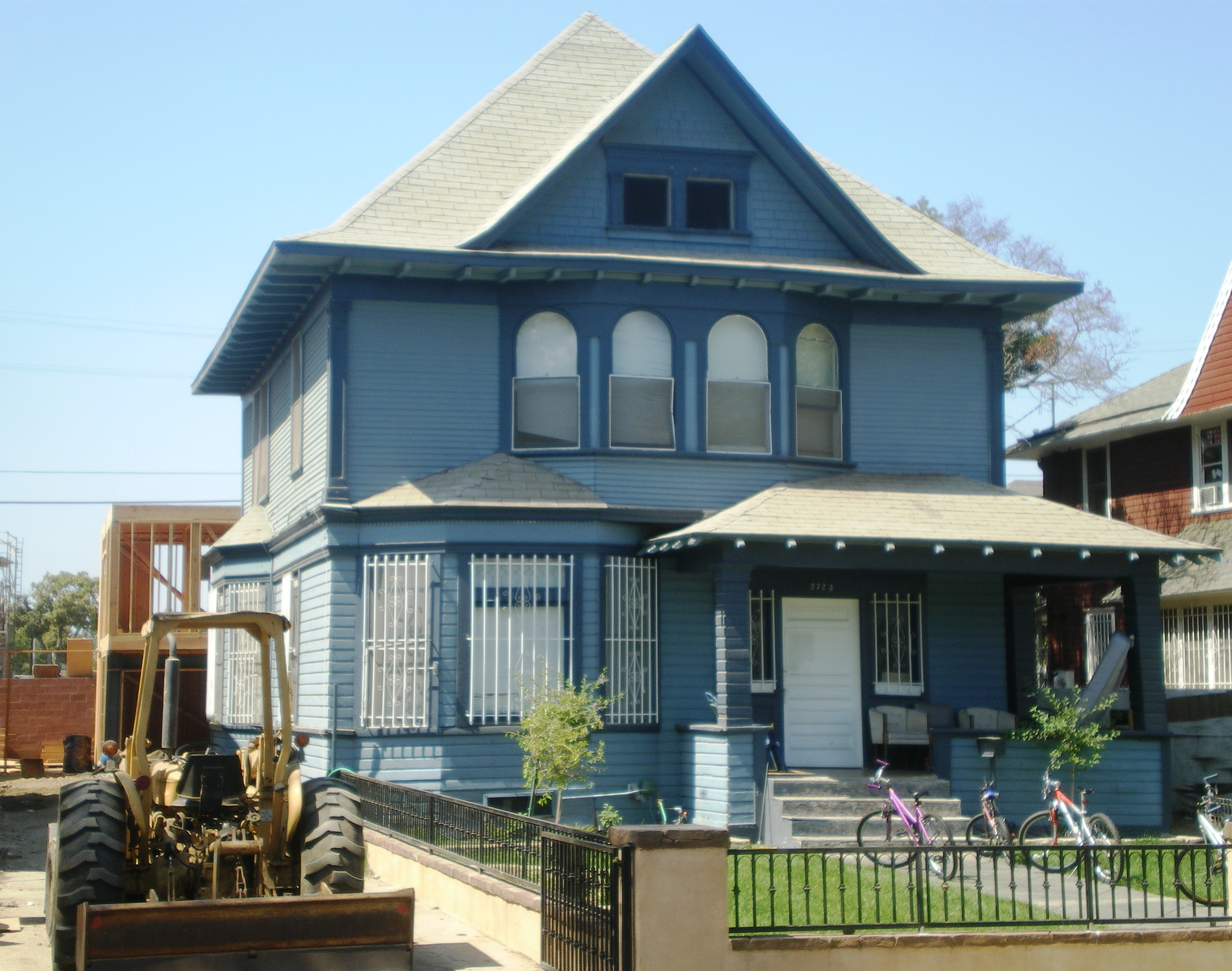
2723 S. Menlo Ave.

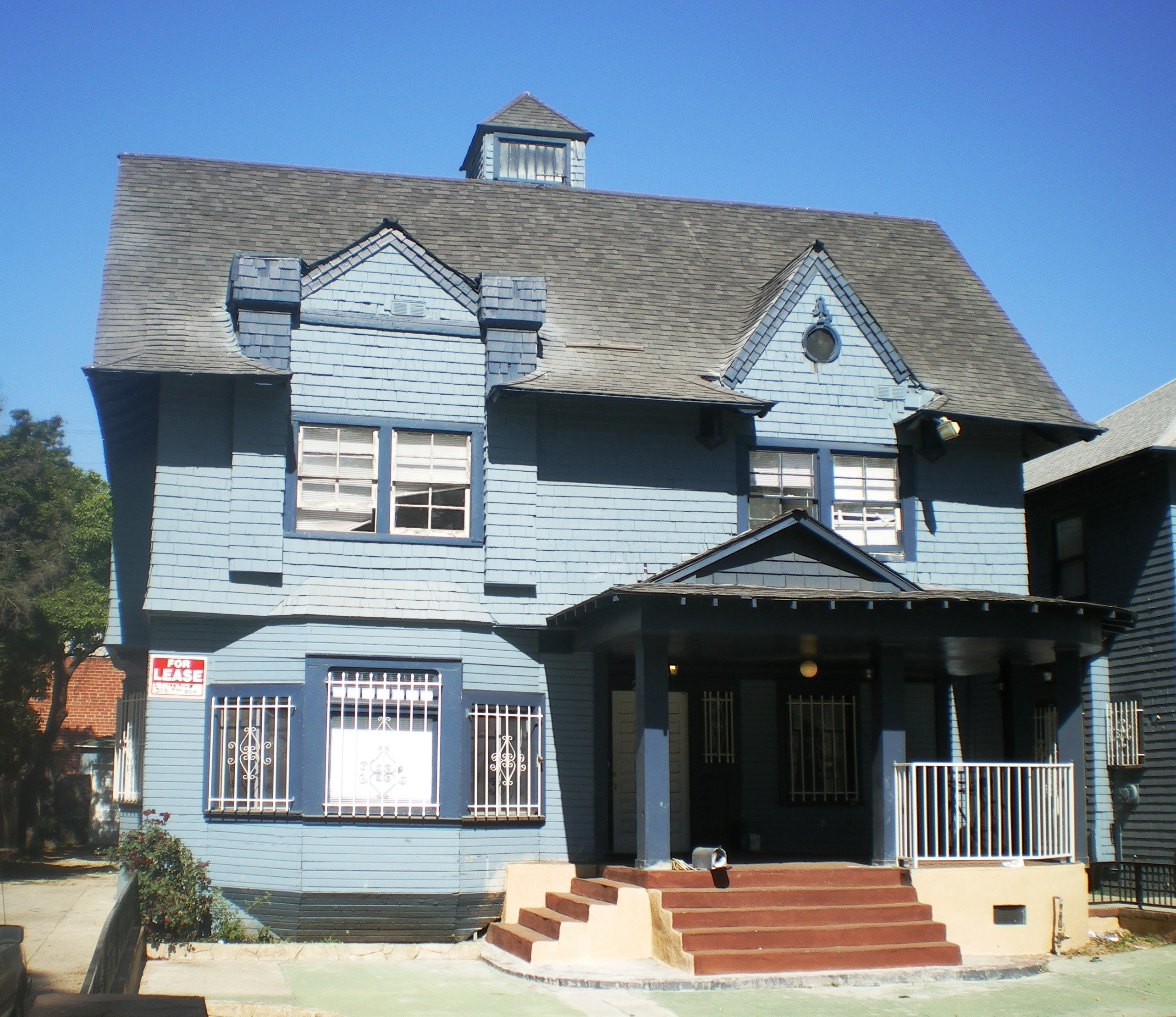
2801 S. Menlo Ave.

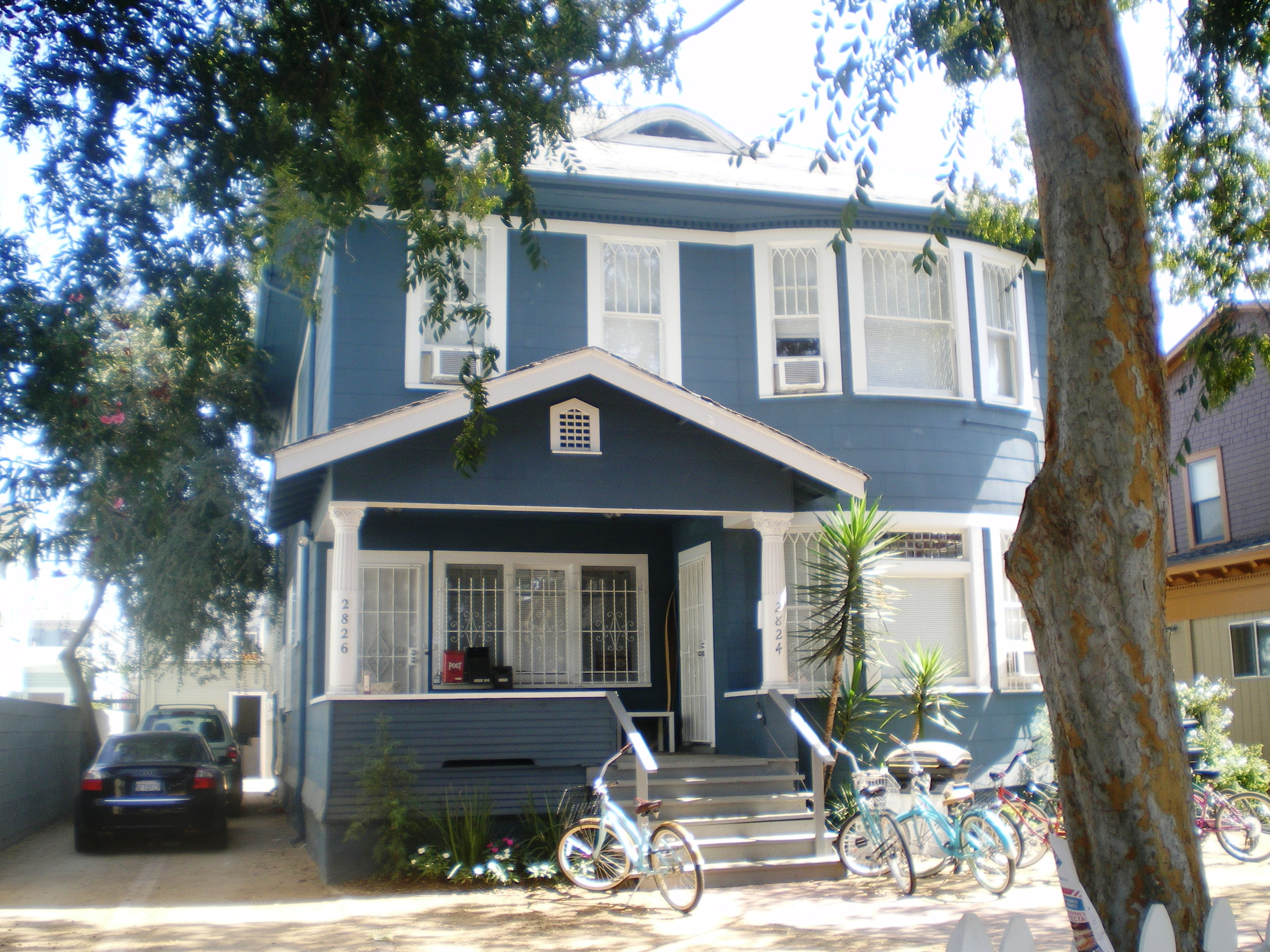
2824 S. Menlo Ave.

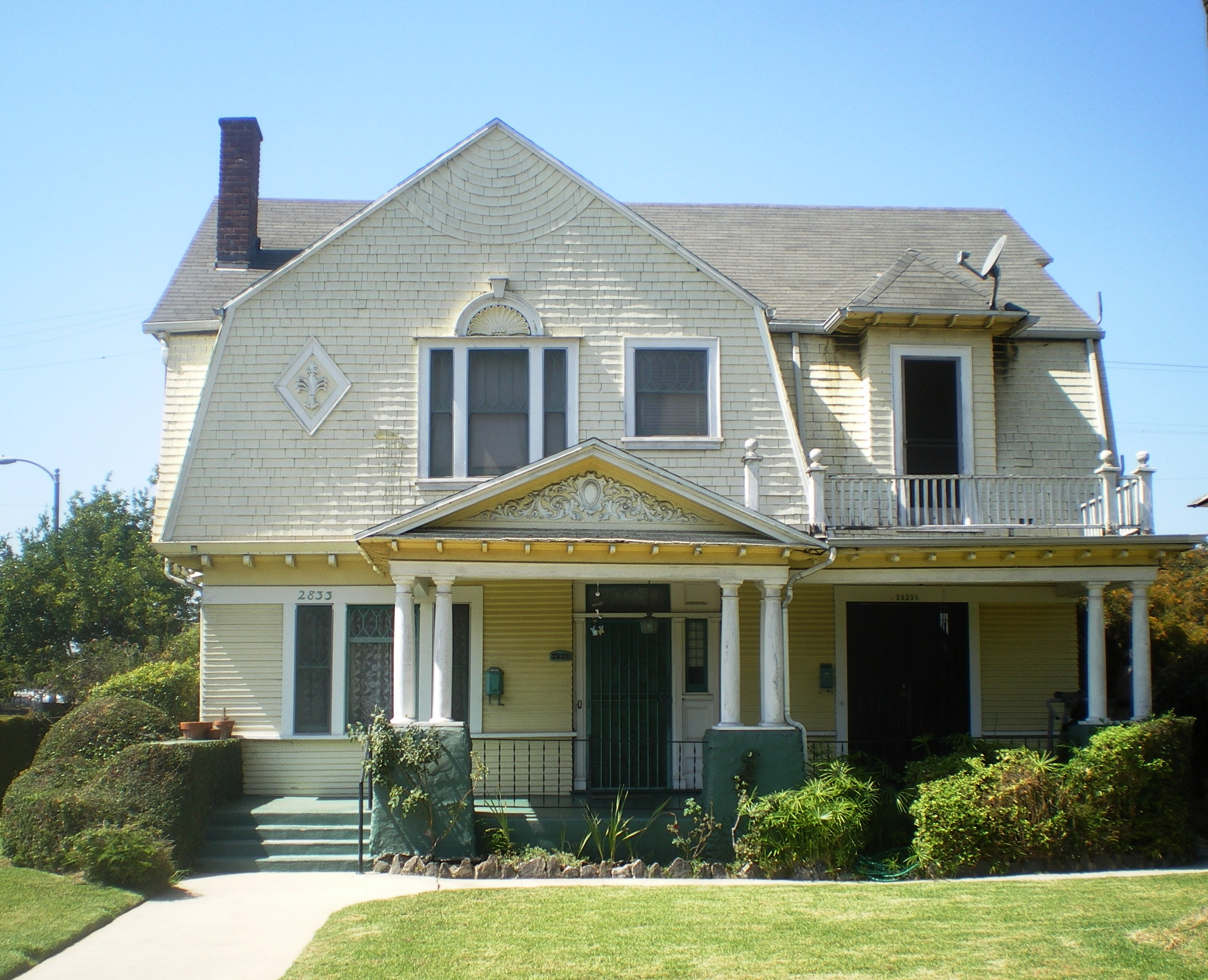
2833 S. Menlo Ave.

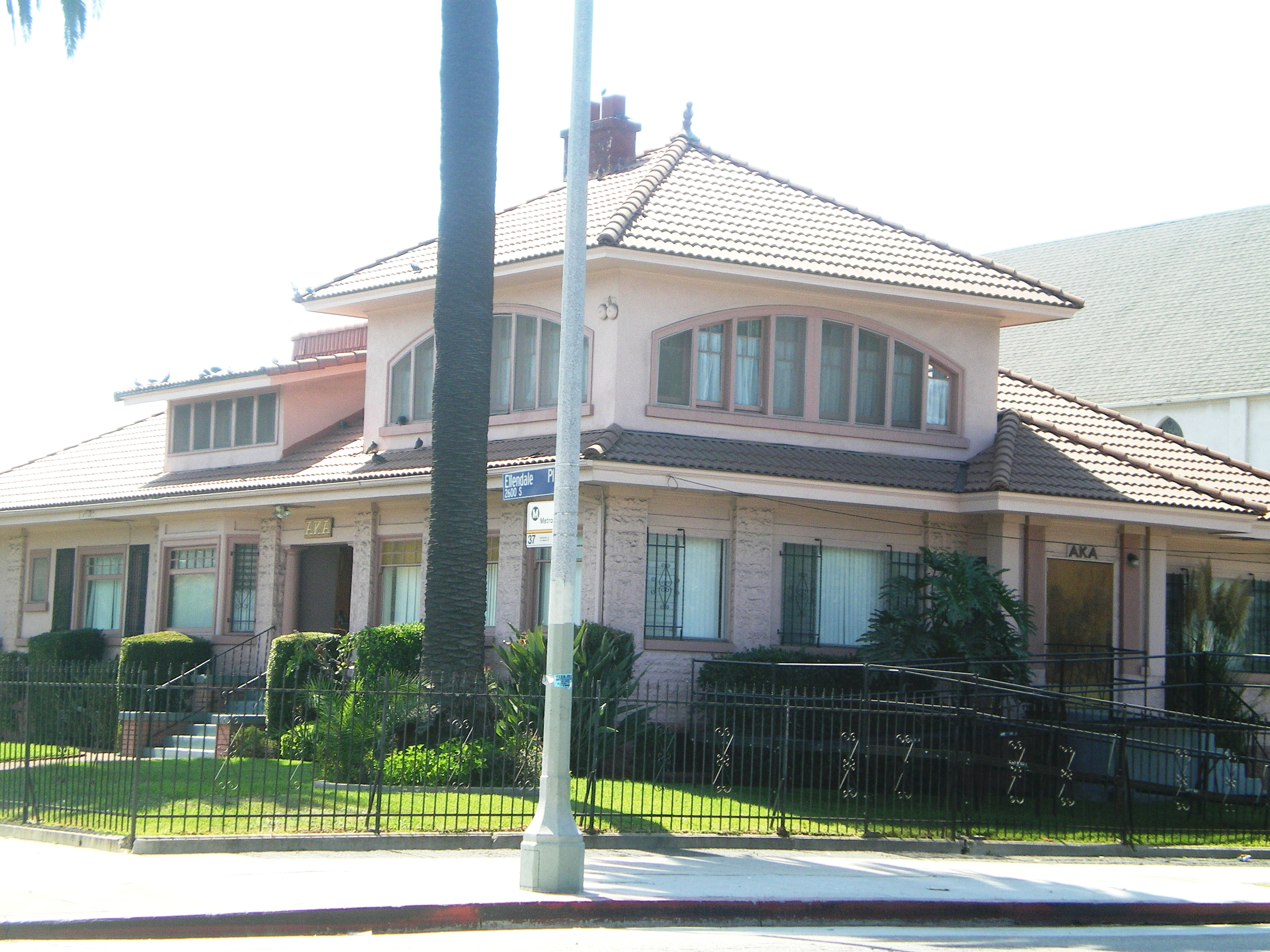
2615 Ellendale Place

== See also ==
- List of Los Angeles Historic-Cultural Monuments in South Los Angeles
- List of Registered Historic Places in Los Angeles
- West Adams, Los Angeles
