= Casa de Rosas =

- U.S. National Register of Historic Places
- Los Angeles Historic-Cultural Monument
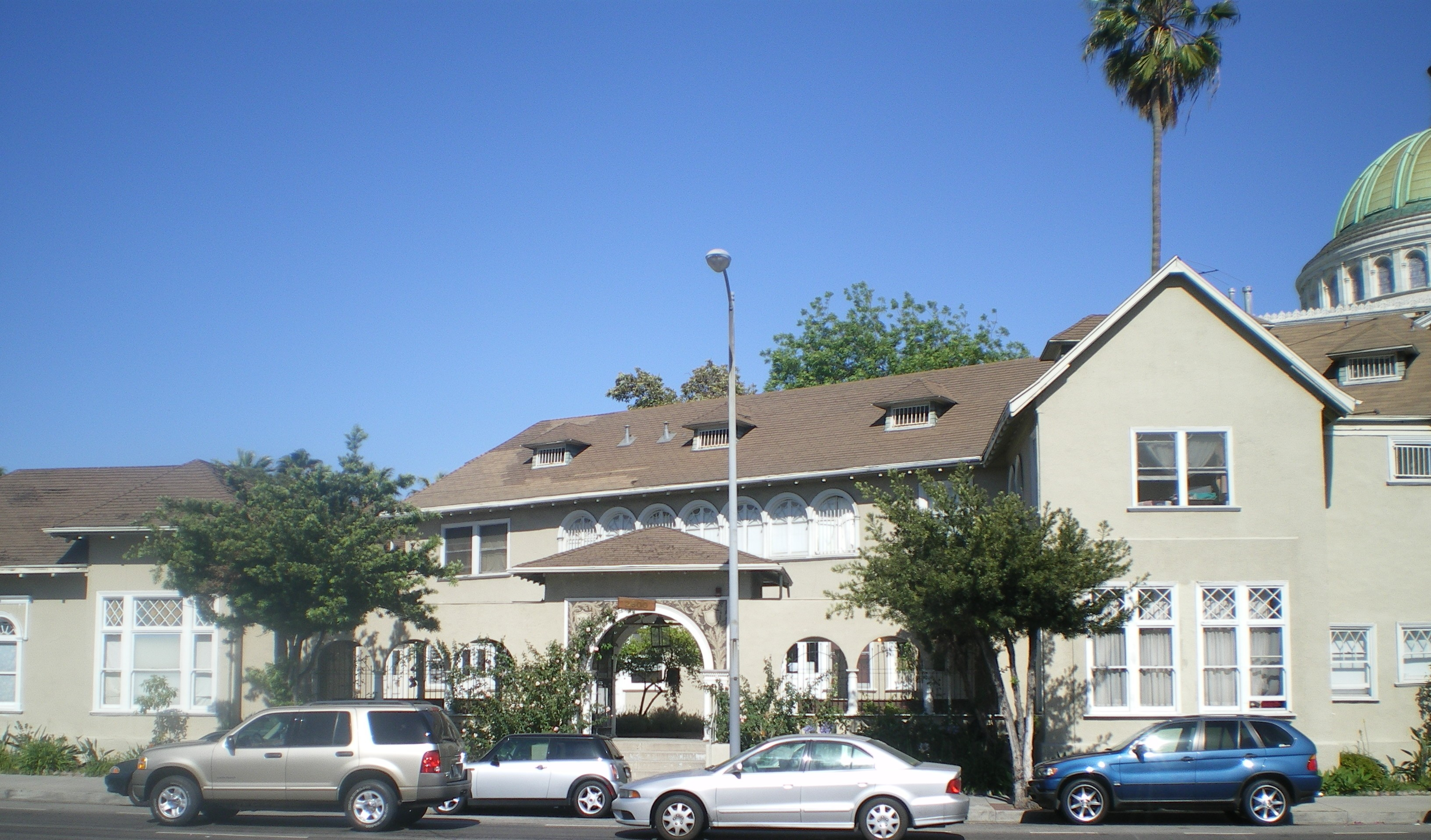
- Casa de Rosas, May 2008

- Location within the Los Angeles metropolitan area Location within California Location within the United States
- Location: 2600 S. Hoover Street, West Adams, Los Angeles
- Coordinates: 34°1′48″N 118°16′55″W
- Built: 1893
- Architects: Sumner P. Hunt; et al.
- Architectural style: Mission Revival, Spanish Revival
- NRHP reference No.: 04000679
- LAHCM No.: 241

Significant dates
- Added to NRHP: July 14, 2004
- Designated LAHCM: April 9, 1981

Casa de Rosas, also known as the Froebel Institute and the Sunshine Mission, is a historic building in the West Adams district of Los Angeles. It is the oldest women's shelter in Los Angeles.

== History ==
The building was designed by Sumner P. Hunt and built in 1893. It was originally an experimental kindergarten and has also been used over the years as a prestigious college preparatory school for girls, an inn and restaurant, a military barracks in World War II, the headquarters of L. Ron Hubbard's Dianetics Foundation, and a shelter for homeless women.

In 2015, the Housing Community Investment Department of Los Angeles (HCID) issued an RFP to redevelop the site, and the winning development team set out to create affordable housing for veterans. In 2016, a construction company mistakenly began demolishing a part of the complex, leaving the interior features of one of the buildings open to water damage, dry rot, and mold. Subsequently, an $18 million restoration effort successfully rehabilitated Casa de Rosas's four historic buildings into 37 residential units—studios, one and two-bedroom units, management offices, common spaces, laundry rooms, and fitness rooms. Exterior aesthetics and landscaping were restored using historic photos.

In 2022, the L.A. Conservancy awarded Casa de Rosas a Preservation Award. In 2023, Casas de Rosas opened to house veterans, with city officials, local leaders and USC President Carol L. Folt present for the occasion.

== See also ==
- List of Registered Historic Places in Los Angeles
- List of Los Angeles Historic-Cultural Monuments in South Los Angeles
