= Silas Reese Burns =

American architect (1855–1940)

- Born: April 8, 1855; Morgantown, Virginia, U.S.
- Died: August 10, 1940 (aged 85)
- Education: Massachusetts Institute of Technology
- Occupation: Architect
- Spouse: Louise Devereux

Silas Reese Burns (1855–1940) was an American architect.

== Biography ==
=== Early life ===
He was born on April 8, 1855, in Morgantown, Virginia. He became a Fellow of the American Institute of Architects in 1882. He graduated from the Massachusetts Institute of Technology in Cambridge, Massachusetts, in 1875.

=== Career ===
Together with Myron Hunt (1868–1952), John B. Parkinson (1861–1935), and Sumner Hunt (1865–1938), he designed the Hotel Maryland in Pasadena, California in 1903–1904, which was destroyed by a fire in 1914. Alongside George Wyman (1860–1939), he designed the Old Soldiers' Home in Sawtelle, Los Angeles.

Together with Sumner Hunt and Abraham Wesley Eager (1864–1930), he designed the private residence of William G. Kerckhoff located at 1325 West Adams Boulevard, Exposition Park, Los Angeles in 1908 and 1909. It is now home to the Annenberg Center for Communication at the University of Southern California. In 1908, they designed the Hope Ranch Country Club in Hope Ranch, California. The same year, they designed a mansion at the corner of Wilshire Boulevard and South Westmoreland Avenue, opposite the Bullocks Wilshire building. A year later, in 1909, they designed a Tudor Revival mansion for Arthur S. Bent (1863–1939), a building contractor, in Pasadena, California.

Together with Sumner Hunt, he designed the Children's Hospital Los Angeles in 1910. In 1911, they designed the A. C. McKevett House in Santa Paula, California. The same year, they designed the E. S. Hall House in Ojai, California. In 1913, they designed the Vermont Square Branch of the Los Angeles Public Library located at 1201 West 48th Street, which is listed on the National Register of Historic Places. From 1910 to 1914, they designed the Southwest Museum of the American Indian in Los Angeles. In 1914, they designed the Henry C. House in Oak Knoll, Pasadena, California. In 1919, they designed the Wilshire Country Club located at 301 North Rossmore Avenue in Los Angeles in 1919, but it was demolished and replaced in 1970. They designed the Ebell Club of Pomona, California, in 1924. They also designed the Ebell of Los Angeles located at 4400 Wilshire Boulevard in 1927, which is listed on the National Register of Historic Places. They also designed the McKinley House in Lafayette Park, Los Angeles, which was torn down in 1999. On the campus of Scripps College in Claremont, California, they designed the Administration Building in 1928, and Balch Hall in 1929.

Together with Sumner Hunt, Roland Coate (1890–1958) and Aurele Vermeulen (1885–1983), he designed the headquarters of the Automobile Club of Southern California located at 2601 South Figueroa Street from 1921 to 1923.

His office was located in the Homer Laughlin Building at 317 South Broadway in Downtown Los Angeles.

=== Personal life ===
He married Laura Beall of Troy, Ohio, in 1881. Laura died in 1884. He married Louise Devereux in 1891. They resided in Alhambra, California, and he retired in San Gabriel, California in 1930, where he was a member of the San Gabriel Valley Country Club. He died on August 10, 1940. He is buried in the San Gabriel Cemetery.
