= Abraham Wesley Eager =

Canadian-born American architect (1864–1930)

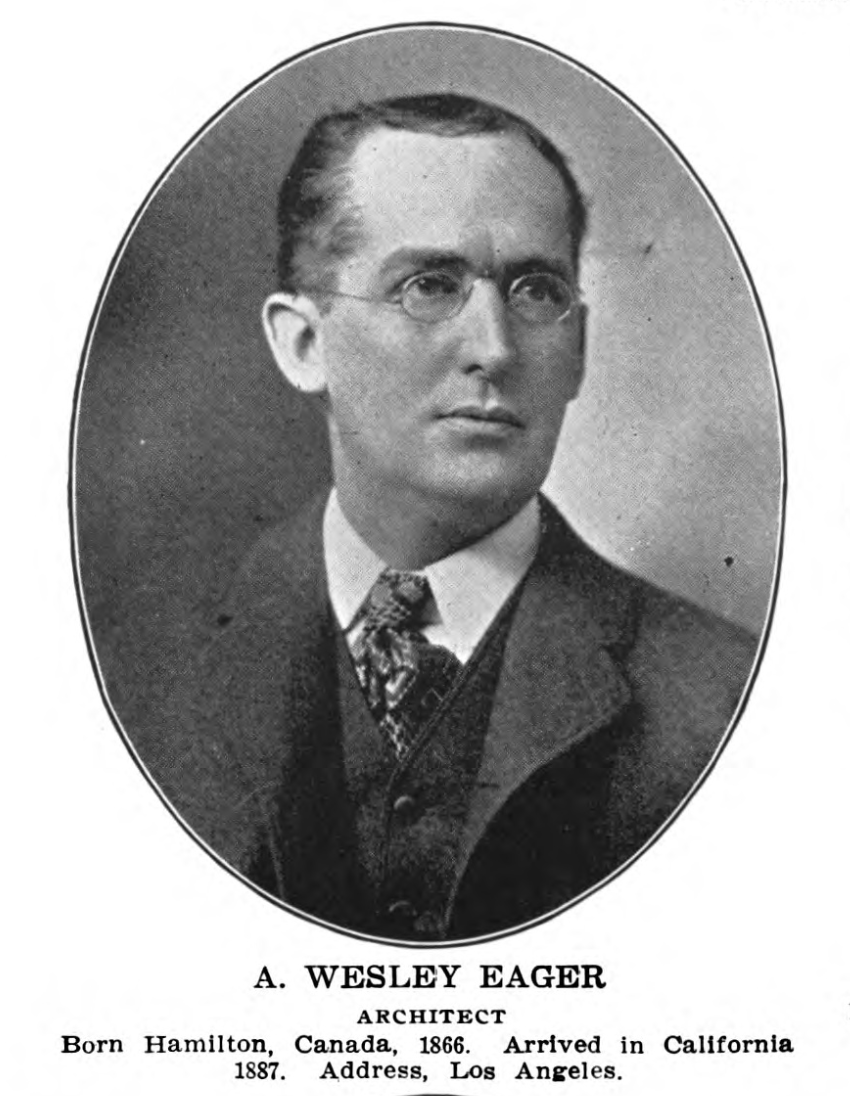
- Eager in ca. 1901
- Born: 1864; Hamilton, Canada West (now Canada)
- Died: November 18, 1930; Playa del Rey, Los Angeles, California, U.S.
- Other names: Abram Wesley Eager, A. Wesley Eager, A.W. Eager
- Occupation: Architect

Abraham Wesley Eager (1864–1930) was a Canadian-born American architect. He designed many houses in Los Angeles, California.

== Early life ==
Abraham Wesley Eager was born in 1864 in Hamilton, Canada West. He moved to California in 1887, and settled in Los Angeles, California in 1901.

== Career ==
Eager designed the Auditorium in Torrance, California, which is listed on the National Register of Historic Places.

With Sumner Hunt and Silas Reese Burns, he designed the private residence of William G. Kerckhoff located at 1325 West Adams Boulevard, Exposition Park, Los Angeles in 1908–1909. It is now home to the Annenberg Center for Communication at the University of Southern California. In 1908, they designed the Hope Ranch Country Club in Hope Ranch, California. The same year, they designed a mansion at the corner of Wilshire Boulevard and South Westmoreland Avenue, opposite the Bullocks Wilshire building. A year later, in 1909, they designed a Tudor Revival mansion for Arthur S. Bent (1863–1939), a building contractor, in Pasadena, California.

With Frank Octavious Eager (1878–1945), Eager designed the Crags Head Country Club off Malibu Canyon Road in Calabasas, California in 1910; it was later demolished. The same year, they designed the private residence of Raymond Walter located at 219 Georgina Avenue in Santa Monica, California. They also designed the Weyside Inn in Ventura, California. In 1911, they designed the C.T. Renaker building in Monrovia, California.

Alongside Myron Hunt (1868–1952), Eager designed the Frank Wilson House in Los Angeles.

== Death ==
Eager died in November 1930.
