= Sumner Hunt =

American architect (1865–1938)

Sumner P. Hunt
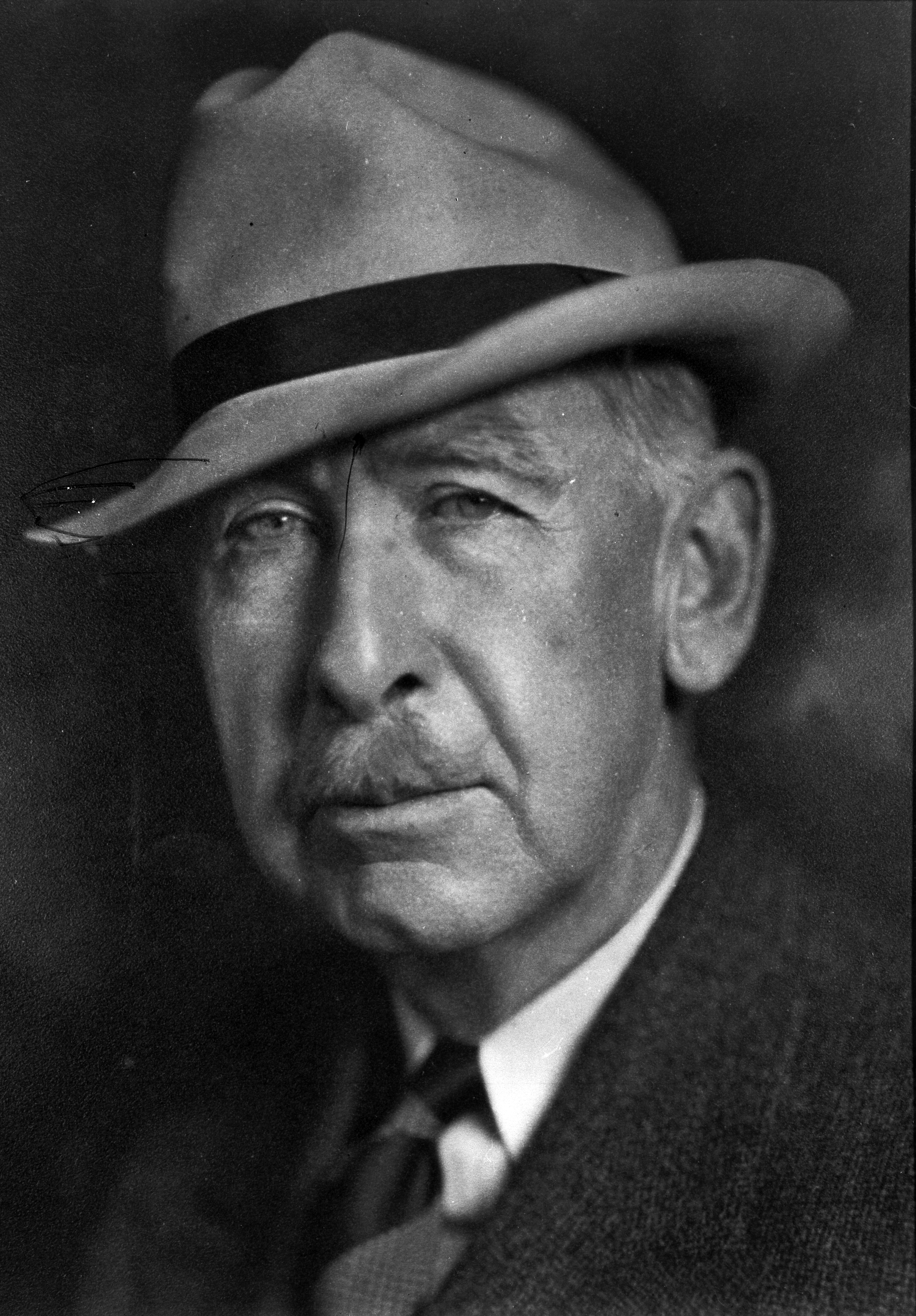
- Born: May 8, 1865; Brooklyn, New York, U.S.
- Died: November 19, 1938 (aged 73); Los Angeles, California, U.S.
- Occupation: Architect
- Practice: Sole practitioner, and in partnerships of: Eisen and Hunt (1895–1899), Hunt and Eager (1899–1908), Hunt, Eager & Burns (1908–1910), Hunt and Burns (1910–1930)
- Buildings: Bradbury Building, Southwest Museum, Vermont Square Branch
- Projects: Los Angeles region, California
- Design: Historicist−Revival architecture styles

Sumner P. Hunt (Brooklyn, New York state, May 8, 1865 – Los Angeles, California, November 19, 1938) was an architect in Los Angeles from 1888 to the 1930s. On January 21, 1892, he married Mary Hancock Chapman. They had a daughter Louise Hunt.

== Life and career ==
Hunt initially apprenticed with and worked for Clarence B. Cutler in Troy, New York from 1879–1887, and in his later career made claim to having worked in Cutler's office in New York City from 1888 to 1889. However, New York City directories make no mention of a Sumner Hunt as city resident and do not include a business listing for Clarence Cutler Architects during those two years. The 1888 Los Angeles City Directory lists Hunt as a resident, living in a rooming house on the east side of Hill Street north of Fifth Street.

In Los Angeles, he worked for Eugene Caulkin and Sidney I. Haas (designers of the 1889 Los Angeles City Hall) from 1888–1889. He supervised construction of City Hall for Caulkin and Haas. Following the building's completion he established his own practice in 1891 in the California Bank Block at 2nd Street and Broadway, the year he was hired by Louis Bradbury to design the Bradbury Building. In 1895, Hunt formed a partnership with Theodore A. Eisen. Eisen & Hunt continued until 1899.

Hunt was hired by Lewis Bradbury sometime in 1891. Bradbury had purchased the parcel at the Third and Broadway intersection on November 11, 1890. In the first week of October 1891, the building which housed an Eckstein's Drug Store was picked up, moved around the southern toe of Prospect/Bunker Hill and set on a new foundation at the northwest corner of Third and Flower. Eckstein had had the city's very first telephone. Sumner Hunt designed Bradbury's office building during the fall of that year and secured a general building permit on December 15. His last recorded involvement in the project was in pulling a foundation permit on the following March 9. Meanwhile, on or about February 8, Bradbury called in Hunt, requested that he bring the building's plans with him and when they met, Bradbury terminated his services without complaint. The L.A. City Directory for 1892 indicates that Wyman was then operating an office in the Stowell Block on the east side of Spring Street north of Third. There is no record of his ever having worked for Hunt, other than the suspect allegation by Wyman's daughters and grandson made to Esther McCoy in 1953. The March 1892 edition of 'Illustrated Herald of Los Angeles included Hunt's perspective rending of the Bradbury Building and made specific mention of a 45 ft. by 120 ft. interior court. As well, the 1896 edition of 'Los Angeles of Today Architecturally' credits Hunt with the design of the building.

In 1899, Hunt went into partnership with Abraham Wesley Eager. Hunt & Eager lasted until 1908, at which point Silas Reese Burns joined the firm, which became Hunt, Eager & Burns. In 1910 Eager left to partner with his brother, Frank Octavious Eager, and the firm became known as Hunt & Burns, a partnership that lasted until Burns' retirement in 1930.

In her essay on Hunt's early work, Karen J. Weitze notes that he may have been involved in the design of Sidney Haas's Moorish- and Mission-revival designs for the California Building at the 1893 World's Columbian Exposition in Chicago. Hunt adopted the Mission Revival Style for the Froebel Institute, also known as Casa de Rosas (1893), and “became a leading proponent of Hispanicism, a fact that was clearly reflected in his Southern California Building at the California Midwinter Exhibition” in 1894.

Hunt joined Charles Fletcher Lummis and the architect Arthur Burnett Benton in 1894 to found the California Landmarks Club, with the purpose of saving Southern California's mission buildings. The following year Lummis mentioned some of Hunt's architecture in an article in Land of Sunshine, in which he advocated for turning Los Angeles from a beautiful city into a picturesque one. In the same article Lummis attributed the plan of the Bradbury building to Hunt. Lummis brought in Eisen and Hunt to design his vision for his home, El Alisal and later hired Hunt and Burns to design the Southwest Museum.

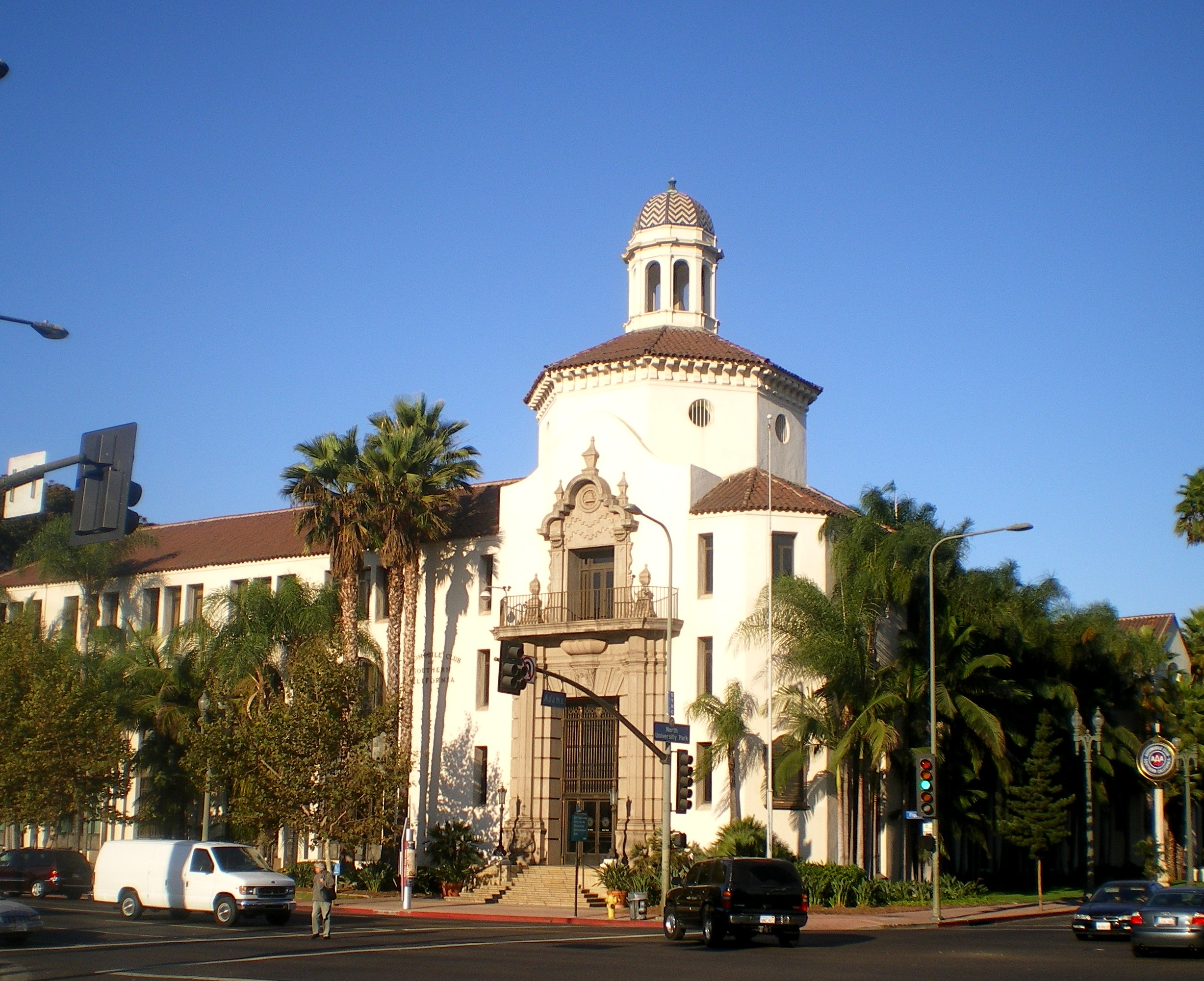
Automobile Club of Southern California headquarters, Exposition Park neighborhood, Los Angeles.

== Practice ==
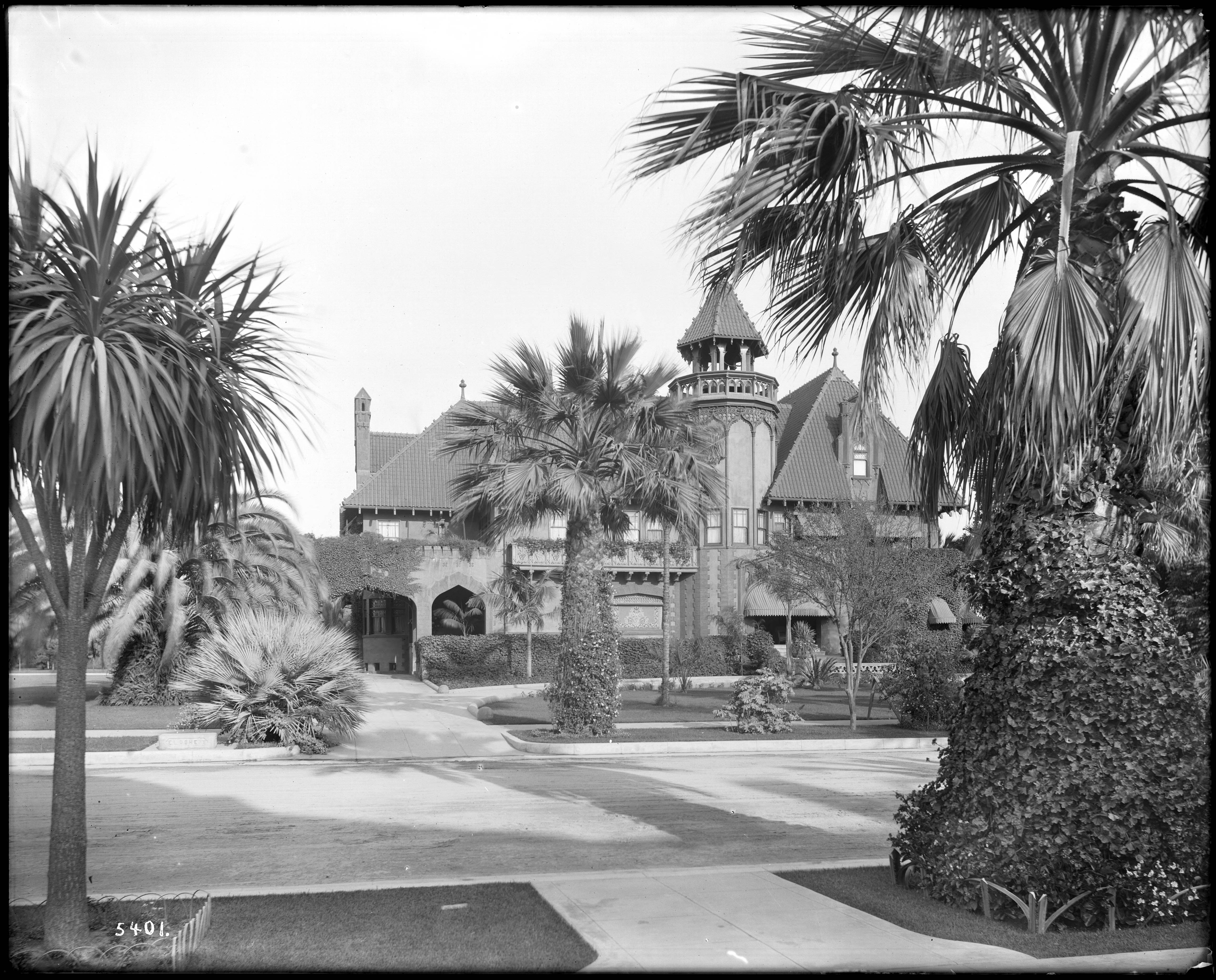
E.L. Doheny mansion, University Park, Los Angeles (1910).

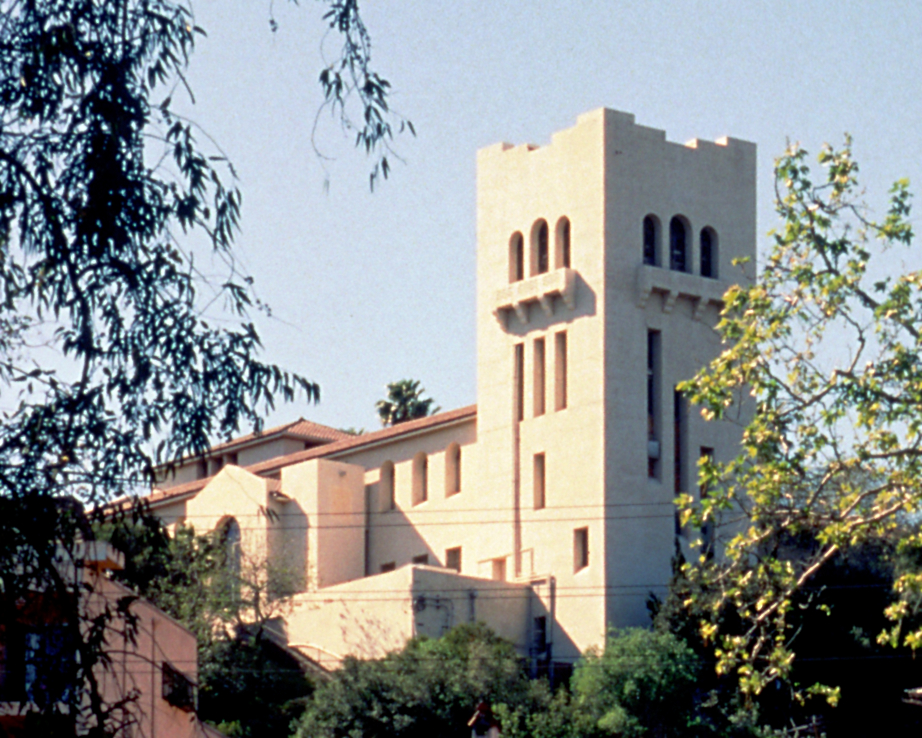
Southwest Museum tower, Mount Washington, Los Angeles.

Projects designed by Hunt, and by his architectural partnerships, include:

- Casa de Rosas — 1893
- Irvine-Byrne Building — 1894

The Press Reference Library (Los Angeles: Los Angeles Examiner, 1912), p,. 82, lists the following buildings for Hunt, although he very likely designed them in partnership:

- Los Angeles Country Club (Hunt & Burns)
- Annandale Country Club
- Ebell Club House (originally at Figueroa and Eighteenth)
- Casa de Rosas (Froebel Institute), Adams and Hoover
- J. F. Francis residence at Ninth and Bonnie Brae
- W. G. Kerckhoff residence on Adams (Hunt & Eager)
- Ross Clark residence on Adams
- William Lacy residence on Wilshire
- H. W. O’Melveny residence on Wilshire
- T. L. Duque residence at New Hampshire and Seventh
- Bradbury Building 1892—1893, Downtown Los Angeles

Eisen and Hunt (1895-1899)

- Lummis House (El Alisal) — 1898, Arroyo Seco, Los Angeles

Hunt and Eager (1899–1908)

- Edward Doheny Mansion — 1899, Chester Place, Los Angeles.
- Arthur S. Bent House - 1904, Highland Park, Los Angeles
- John G. Bullock House — 1906, Los Angeles
- Echo Park Clubhouse — 1908, Echo Park, Los Angeles
- W. G. Kerckhoff Hall — 1908, West Adams, Los Angeles

According to Our Architecture: Morgan & Walls, John Parkinson, Hunt & Eager, compiled by J. L. Le Berthon (Los Angeles, CA: J. L. Le Berthon, 1904), Hunt & Eager were responsible for the following structures:

- Raymond Hotel, Pasadena (original plans by Thomas William Parkes, revised and executed by Hunt & Eager)
- Hollywood Cemetery entrance
- Santa Barbara apartment house
- Marion apartment house
- F. W. Braun Residence
- H. W. Vermillion residence
- Sumner P. Hunt (Hunt Hancock) residence on Severance Street, Los Angeles
- A. Wesley Eager residence
- Foster residence
- Beville residence, Hollywood
- Cumnock School of Expression on Vermont
- Strassburg residence
- Vail residence
- Bragdon residence
- Armstrong residence
- Gillis residence
- Brown-Janvier residence
- A. Herman residence
- M. E. Moore residence
- R. S. Crombie residence
- S. K. Lindley residence
- Theodore Weiss residence
- F. K. Wilson residence
- Storrow residence
- Sartori residence
- Fremont residence
- Judge Knight residence

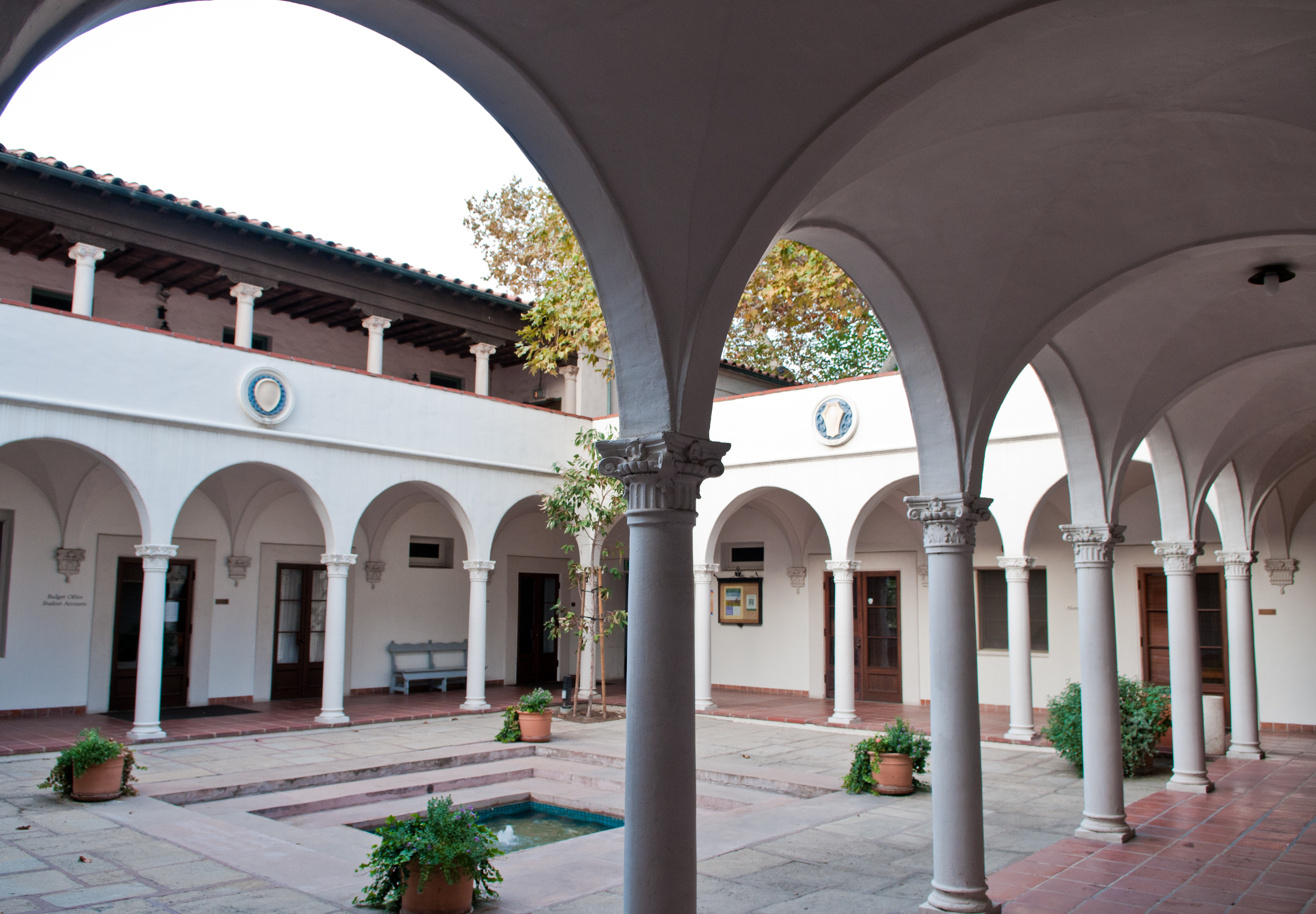
Balch Hall, Scripps College

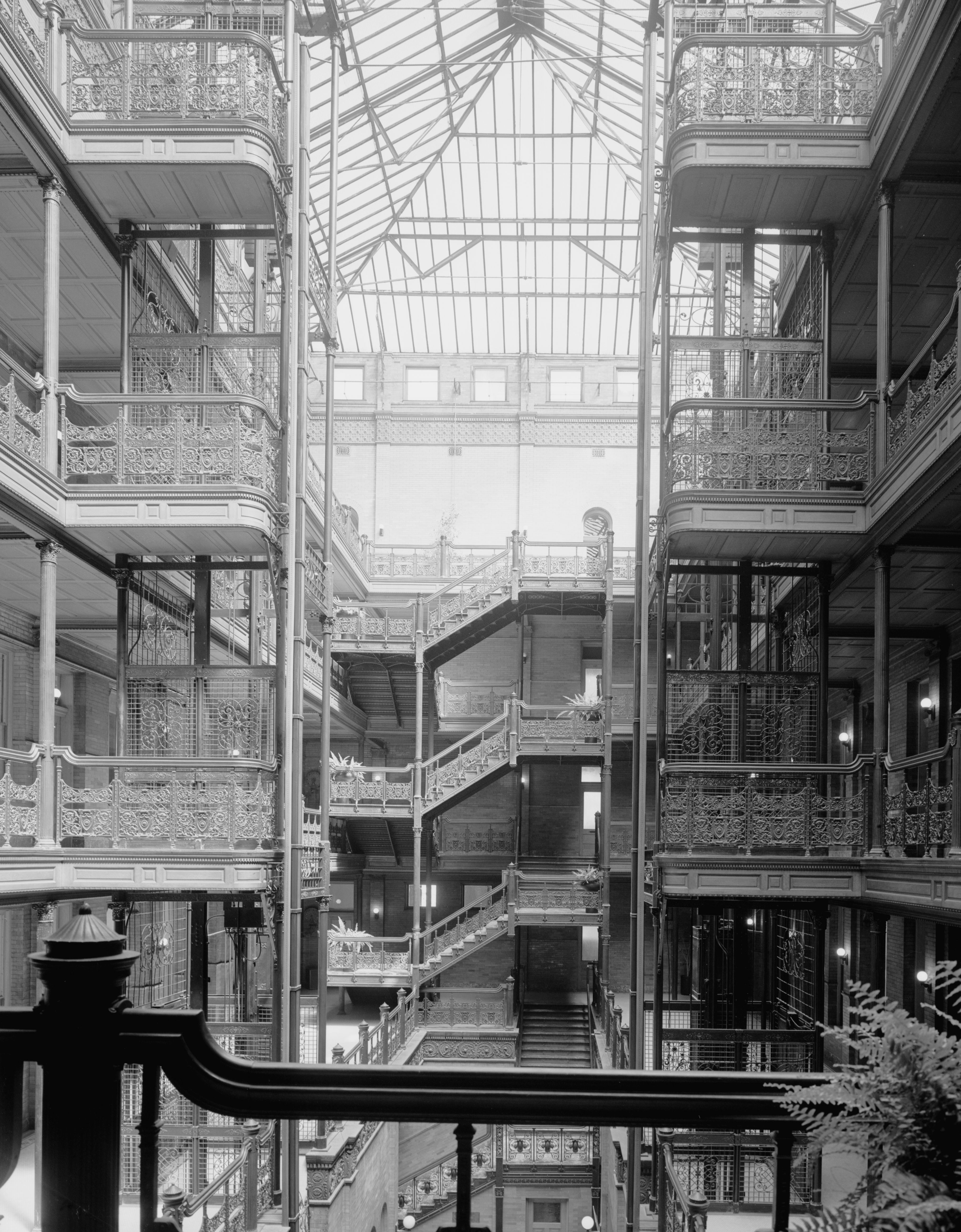
Interior atrium of Bradbury Building, Downtown Los Angeles.

Hunt and Burns (1910–1930)

- Pierpont Inn — 1910, Ventura, California
- Glen Tavern Inn — 1910, Santa Paula, California
- Los Angeles Country Club clubhouse — 1911, Los Angeles
- Scottish Rite Temple — 1911, Santa Fe, New Mexico
- Vermont Square Branch library — 1912, South Los Angeles
- Highland Park Ebell Club — 1913, Highland Park, Los Angeles
- Southwest Museum — 1914, Mount Washington, Los Angeles
- Los Angeles Tennis Club — 1921, Los Angeles
- Ventura County Country Club (Saticoy Country Club) — 1921
- Automobile Club of Southern California headquarters — 1923, Exposition Park, Los Angeles
- Virginia Robinson Gardens Pool Pavilion — 1924, Beverly Hills, California
- Ebell of Los Angeles clubhouse — 1927, Wilshire Boulevard, Los Angeles
- Balch Hall — 1929, Scripps College campus in Claremont, California. A gift of Mr. and Mrs. Allan C. Balch, in honor of trustee Janet Jacks Balch.

== See also ==
- Sumner Hunt buildings
