= Southwest Museum of the American Indian =

Defunct museum in Los Angeles

Historic Southwest Museum Mt. Washington Campus
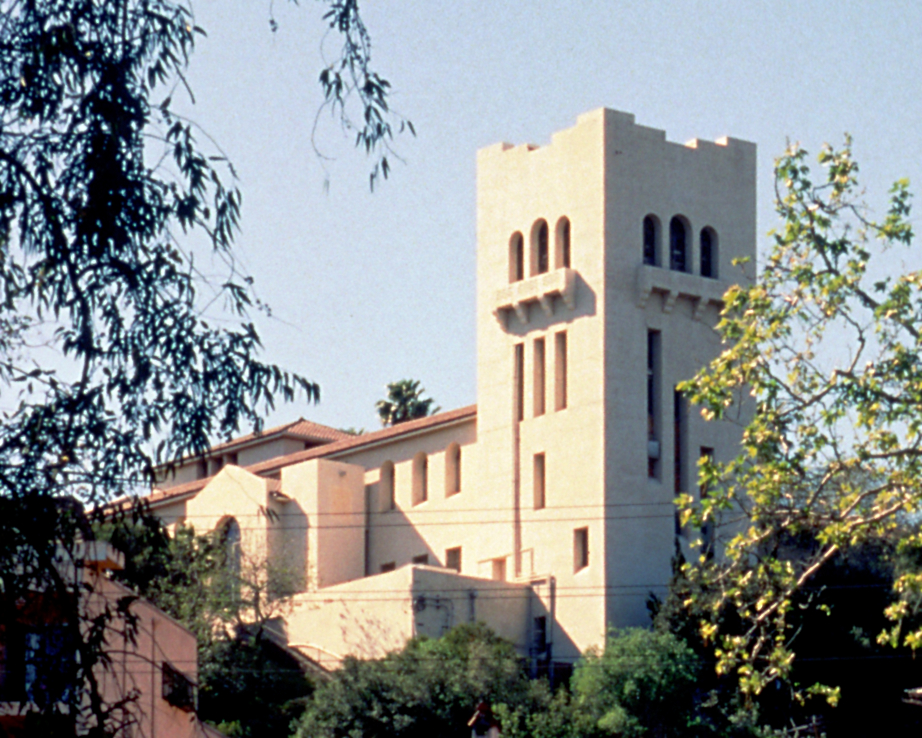
- Museum building as seen from Sycamore Grove Park
- Former name: Southwest Museum of the American Indian
- Established: 1907
- Dissolved: 2022
- Location: 234 Museum Drive; Los Angeles, California
- Coordinates: 34.1004°N 118.2059°W
- Founder: Charles Fletcher Lummis
- Architect: Sumner Hunt
- Public transit access: Southwest Museum
- Website: theautry.org/visit/mt-washington-campus
- Southwest Museum of the American Indian
- U.S. National Register of Historic Places
- Los Angeles Historic-Cultural Monument
- Built: 1912–1914
- Architectural style: Mission/Spanish Revival
- NRHP reference No.: 92001270
- LAHCM No.: 283

Significant dates
- Added to NRHP: March 11, 2004
- Designated LAHCM: August 29, 1984

The Southwest Museum of the American Indian was a museum, library, and archive located in the Mt. Washington neighborhood of Los Angeles, California, United States, above the north-western bank of the Arroyo Seco canyon and stream. The museum was owned, and later absorbed by, the Autry Museum of the American West. Its collections dealt mainly with Native Americans. It also had an extensive collection of pre-Hispanic, Spanish colonial, Latino, and Western American art and artifacts.

Major collections included American Indians of the Great Plains, American Indians of California, and American Indians of the Northwest Coast. Most of those materials were moved off-site. The Autry and the Southwest Museum hold the second-largest collection of indigenous art and artifacts in the country, second to the Smithsonian's National Museum of the American Indian.

The Metro A Line stops down the hill from the museum at the Southwest Museum station. About a block from the A Line stop is an entrance on Museum Drive that opens to a long tunnel formerly filled with dioramas, since removed by the Autry Museum and placed in storage. At the end of the tunnel is an elevator to the museum's lower lobby.

The museum closed permanently in September 2022.

== History ==
Charles Fletcher Lummis, an anthropologist, historian, journalist, and photographer, created the Southwest Society, which was the western branch of the Archaeological Institute of America. He gained the support of city leaders, and with the financial backing of attorney Joseph Scott, opened the Southwest Museum in 1907. The collection was first exhibited in downtown Los Angeles' Pacific Electric building, then moved to the May Company building in 1908, and finally to the Mt. Washington site in 1914.

The 1914 building was designed by architects Sumner P. Hunt and Silas Reese Burns. Later additions to the museum include the Caroline Boeing Poole Wing of Basketry (completed 1941), by architect Gordon B. Kaufmann, and the Braun Research Library (1971), by architect Glen E. Cook.

Frederick Russell Burnham, the highly decorated military scout and father of the international scouting movement, was an early president.

Carl Dentzel, a prominent historian and preservationist, was director of the museum from 1955 to 1980.

In 1993, Patrick Houlihan, the director of the museum from 1981 to 1987, was convicted on five counts of embezzlement and two counts of grand theft for selling or trading about 20 items from the museum's collection. In a civil lawsuit, the museum alleged that Houlihan took 127 items worth an estimated $2.2 million.

In 2003, the financially teetering museum was absorbed by the Autry Museum, which designated it as its Mt. Washington Campus. The museum ceased operating full-time, and closed entirely in September 2022. The museum's collections were relocated to a new controlled environment facility, which opened in October 2022.

Following years of controversy with the Friends of the Southwest Museum and other local community organizations, the Autry began a partnership with the National Trust for Historic Preservation and the City of Los Angeles to develop a long-term plan for the site. On January 22, 2015, the Southwest Museum was designated a National Treasure by the National Trust for Historic Preservation. In March 2019, the Autry and the National Trust published a Request for Interest for the revitalization and reuse of the historic Southwest Museum campus and Casa de Adobe. As of November 2022, the Autry is no longer seeking to renovate the building for use as a museum space, which would cost over $100 million, and is instead looking to sell the building.

== See also ==
- List of Registered Historic Places in Los Angeles
- Bertha Parker Pallan
- Mark Raymond Harrington
