= Belvedere Heights, Los Angeles =

Belvedere Heights, Los Angeles may mean:

- Belvedere Heights, East Los Angeles, early 20th-century subdivision near in what is now northwestern East Los Angeles, California
- Belvedere Heights, early 20th-century subdivision near W. 21st St. and Western Av. in the Jefferson Park and Adams-Normandie neighborhoods of southwestern part of the City Los Angeles
- Belvedere Heights, a fictitious Chicano neighborhood of Los Angeles in the TV series Penny Dreadful: City of Angels
