= Forthmann House =

Coordinates: 34.029179°N 118.284303°W

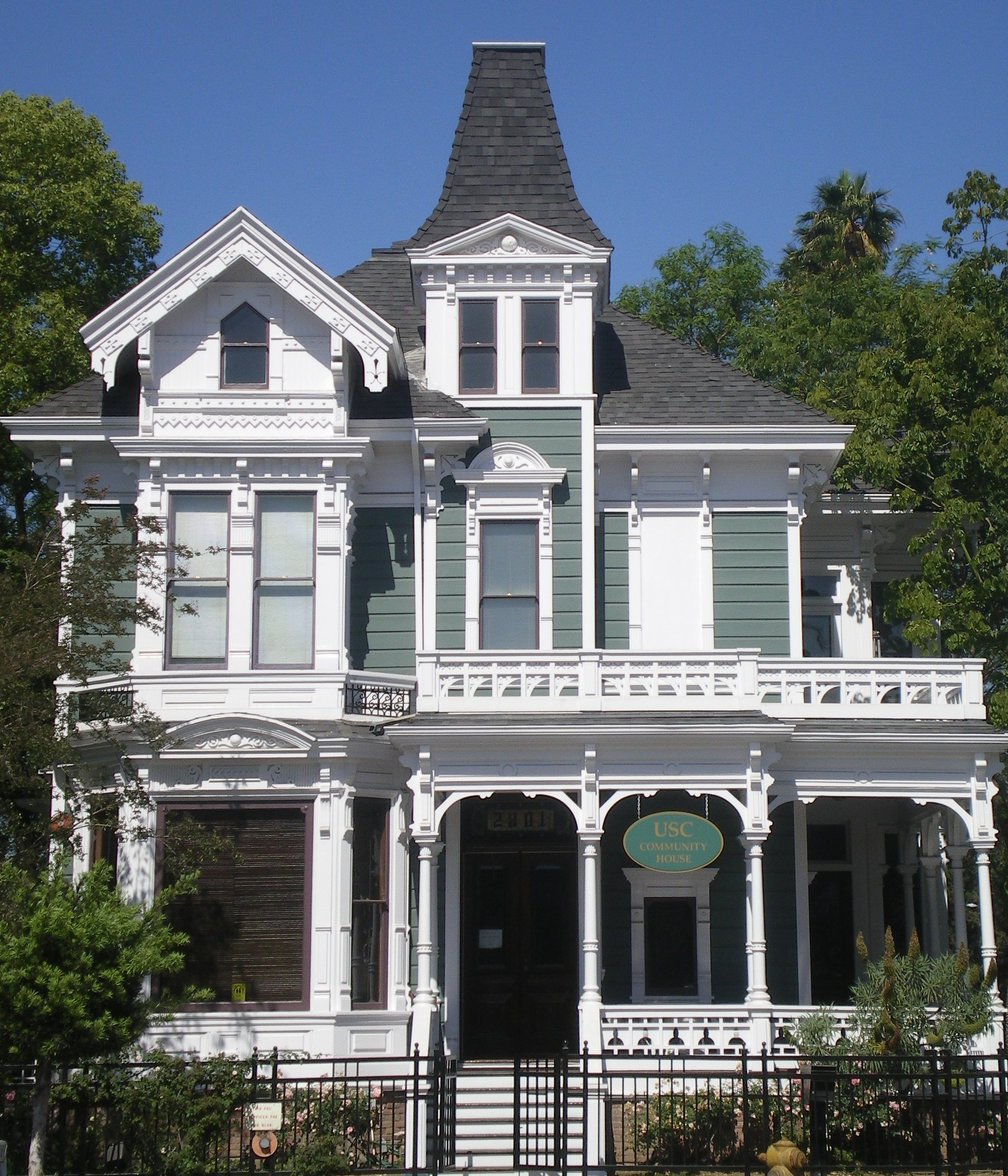
- Forthmann House

- Location within the Los Angeles metropolitan area
- Location: 2801 S. Hoover Street, West Adams, Los Angeles, California

History
- Built: 1887

Site notes
- Governing body: University of Southern California

Los Angeles Historic-Cultural Monument
- Designated: October 4, 1972
- Reference no.: 103

Forthmann House, now known as USC Community House, is a Los Angeles Historic-Cultural Monument (No. 103) located in the North University Park Historic District of West Adams, Los Angeles, California. It is a 4,200-square-foot (390 m^{2}) Victorian house built c.1887, designed by Burgess J. Reeve.

On 23 November 1988, it was moved from 629 W. 18th St. to 1101 W. 28th St. (today 2801 S. Hoover St.). A secondary structure known as the Forthmann Carriage House was moved from its original location to its new home in Angelino Heights at 812 E Edgeware Rd.

The house was registered as a Los Angeles Historic-Cultural Monument in 1972.

== See also ==
- List of Los Angeles Historic-Cultural Monuments in South Los Angeles
