= Burgess J. Reeve =

British-American architect

Burgess John Reeve, also often mentioned as B. J. Reeve was an architect based in Los Angeles whose 1882 Phillips Block was when built the largest and most monumental building in what was then a town of around 12,000 people.

== Selected works ==
All in Los Angeles, California.

- Forthmann Carriage House, Angelino Heights, Los Angeles (Los Angeles Historic-Cultural Monument)
- Forthmann House c. 1887, North University Park Historic District of West Adams, Los Angeles (Los Angeles Historic-Cultural Monument)
- Phillips Block, Spring St. west side south of Temple St., c. 1882, home of A. Hamburger & Sons "The People's Store", the largest retailer in Los Angeles at the time; predecessor of May Company California, four stories, second four-story building in Los Angeles, cost $260,000
- Hotel Ramona/Ramona Block, SW corner of Third and Spring, Los Angeles (1885, demolished Demolished in 1903 and replaced by the Washington Building, built 1912, Parkinson and Bergstrom, still standing.
- Sentous Block or Sentous Building (19th c., demolished late 1950s) was located at 615-9 N Main St., with a back entrance on 616-620 North Spring St. (previously called Upper Main St., then San Fernando St.). Designed in 1886. Louis Sentous was a French pioneer in the early days of Los Angeles. The San Fernando Theatre was located here. The site is now part of the El Pueblo parking lot.
- St. Vincent's College and Church, predecessor of Loyola Marymount University, campus at northeast corner of Washington and Grand (razed), cost $65,000
- United States Hotel, three stories, cost $56,000

== Gallery: Phillips Block ==
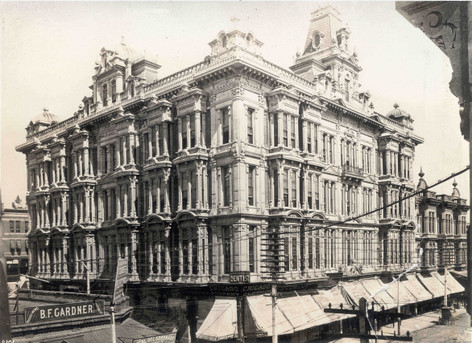
Phillips Block

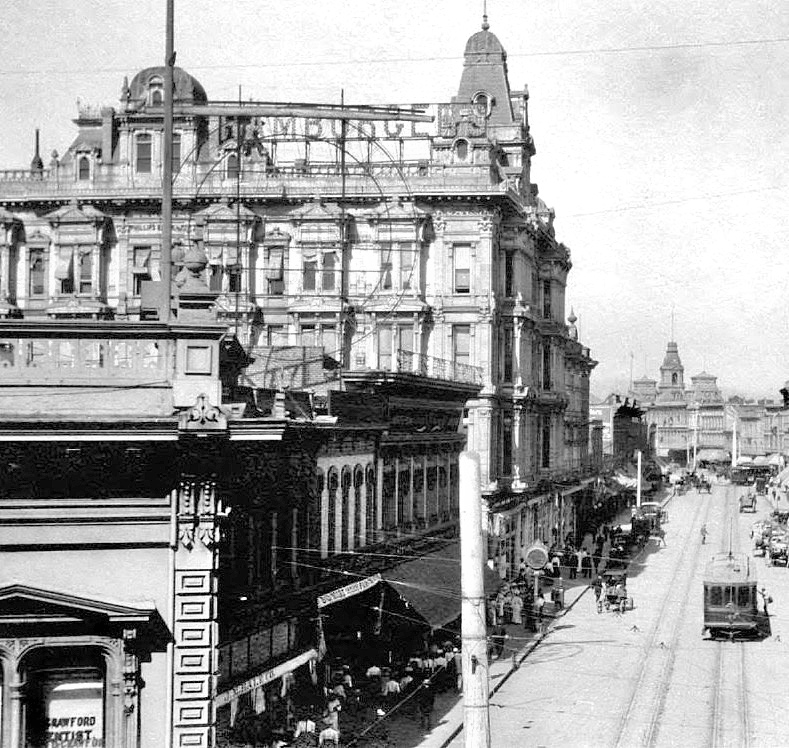
Hamburger's "People's Store" after construction of and expansion into the Philips Block, Spring Street at Franklin ca. 1890s

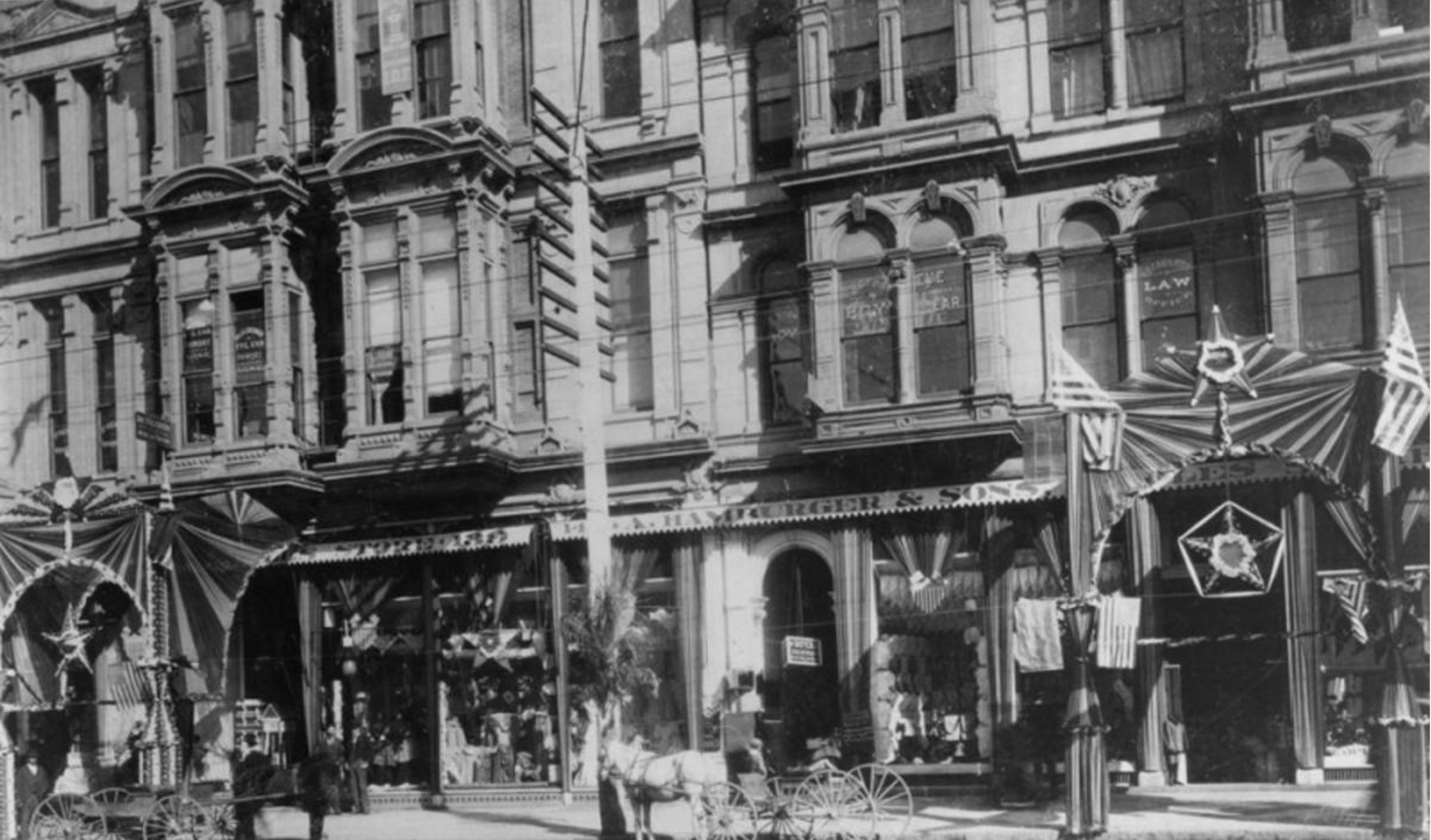
Entrance to Hamburger's department store (forerunner of May Co. California), located at the Phillips Block 1888–1908.

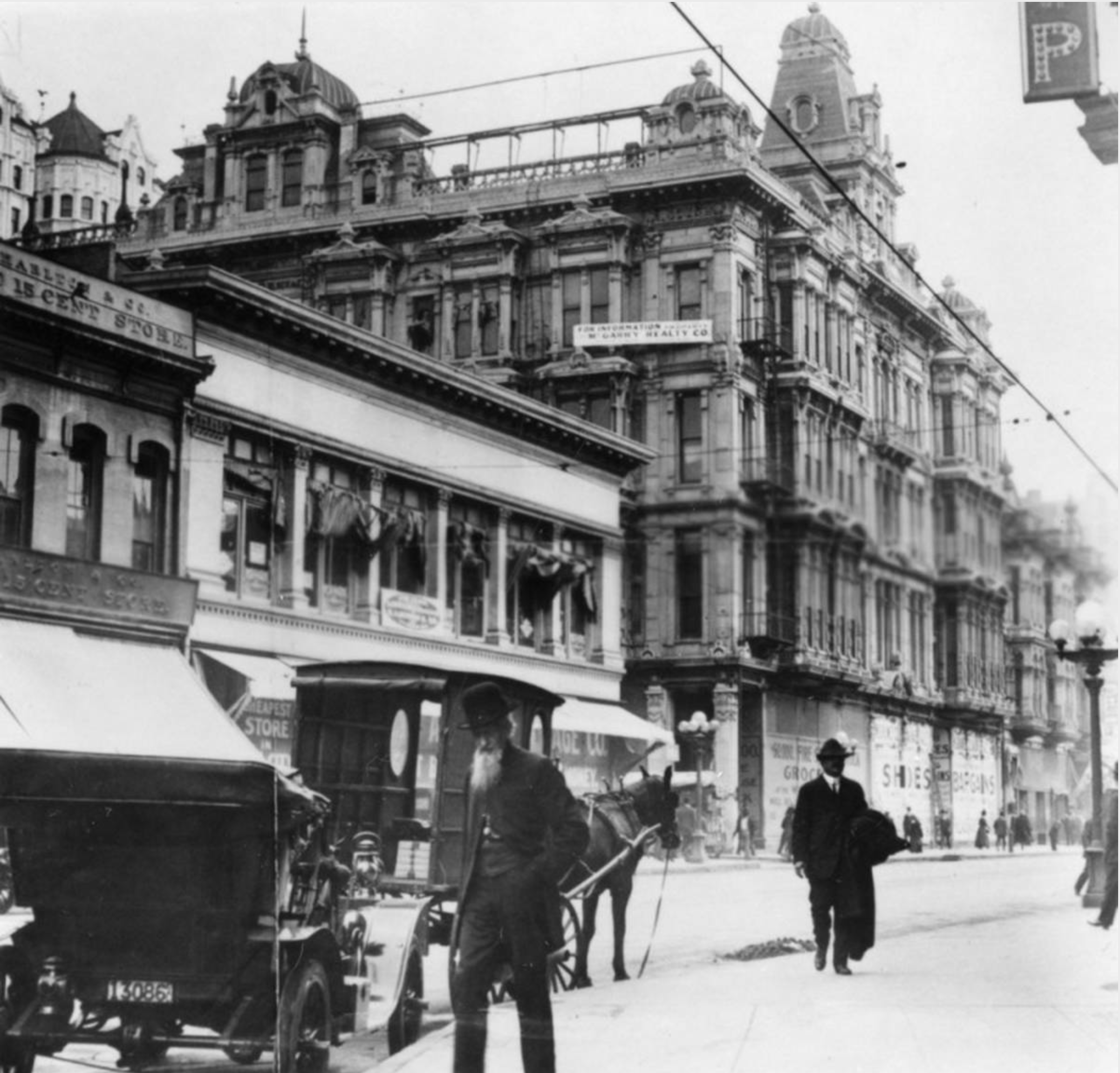
Phillips Block about 1900

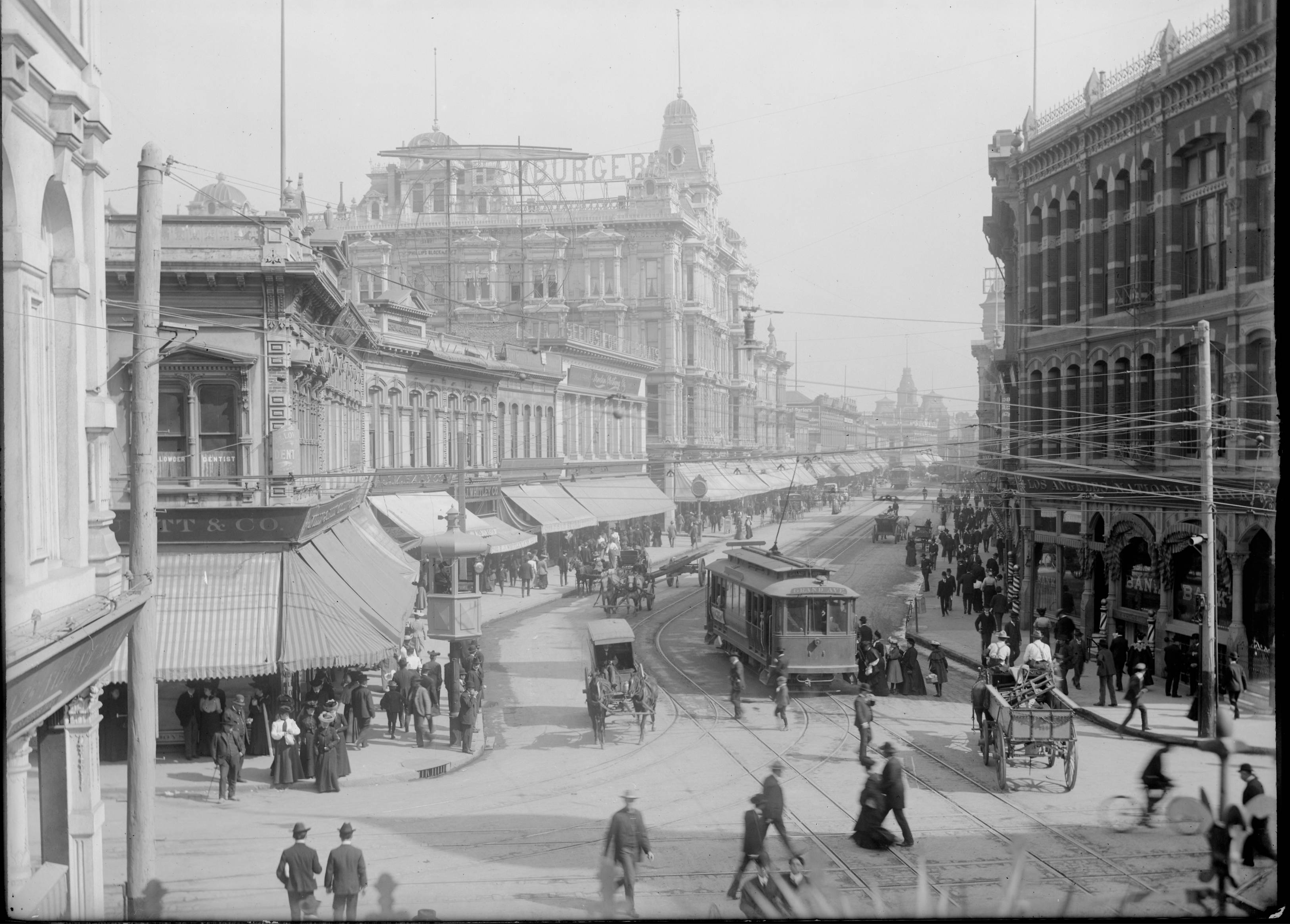
View north on Spring St. from First Street. Phillips Block visible in background, Harris & Frank's London Clothing Company at the SW corner of Franklin/Spring.

== Gallery: Other works ==
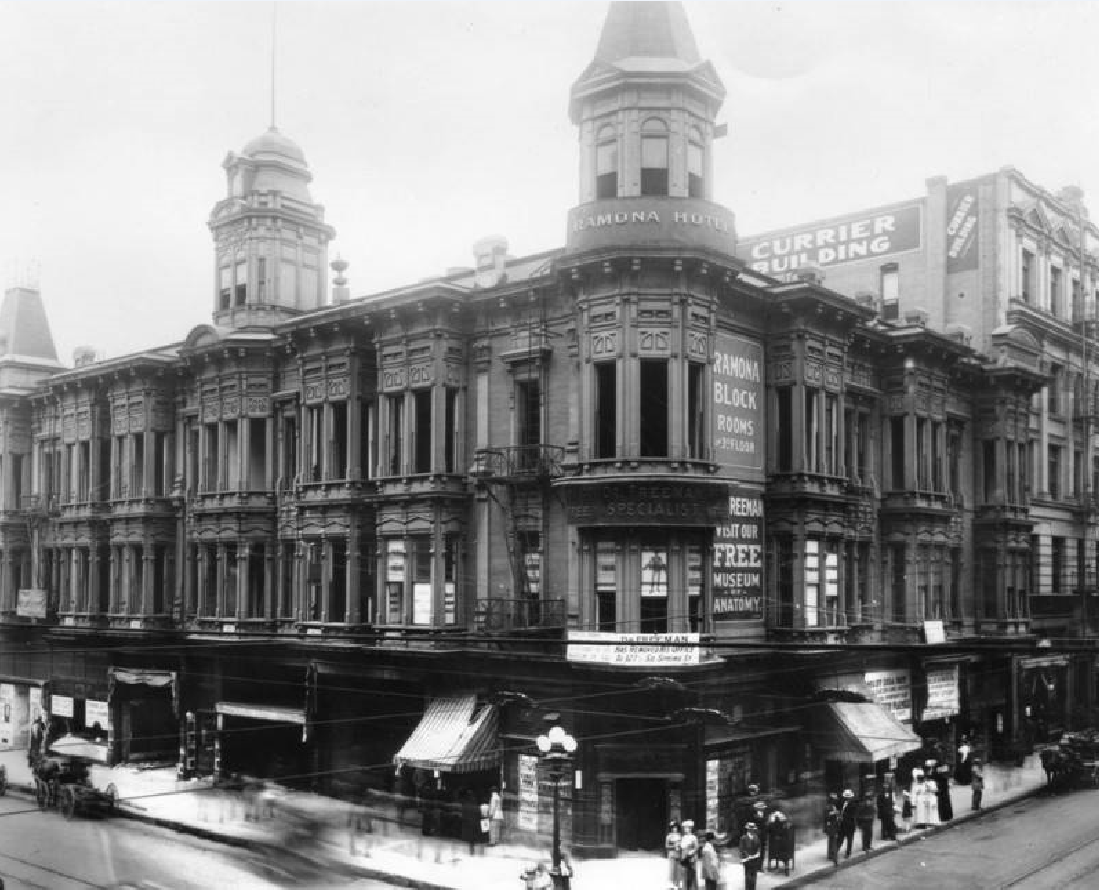
Hotel Ramona in the Ramona Block

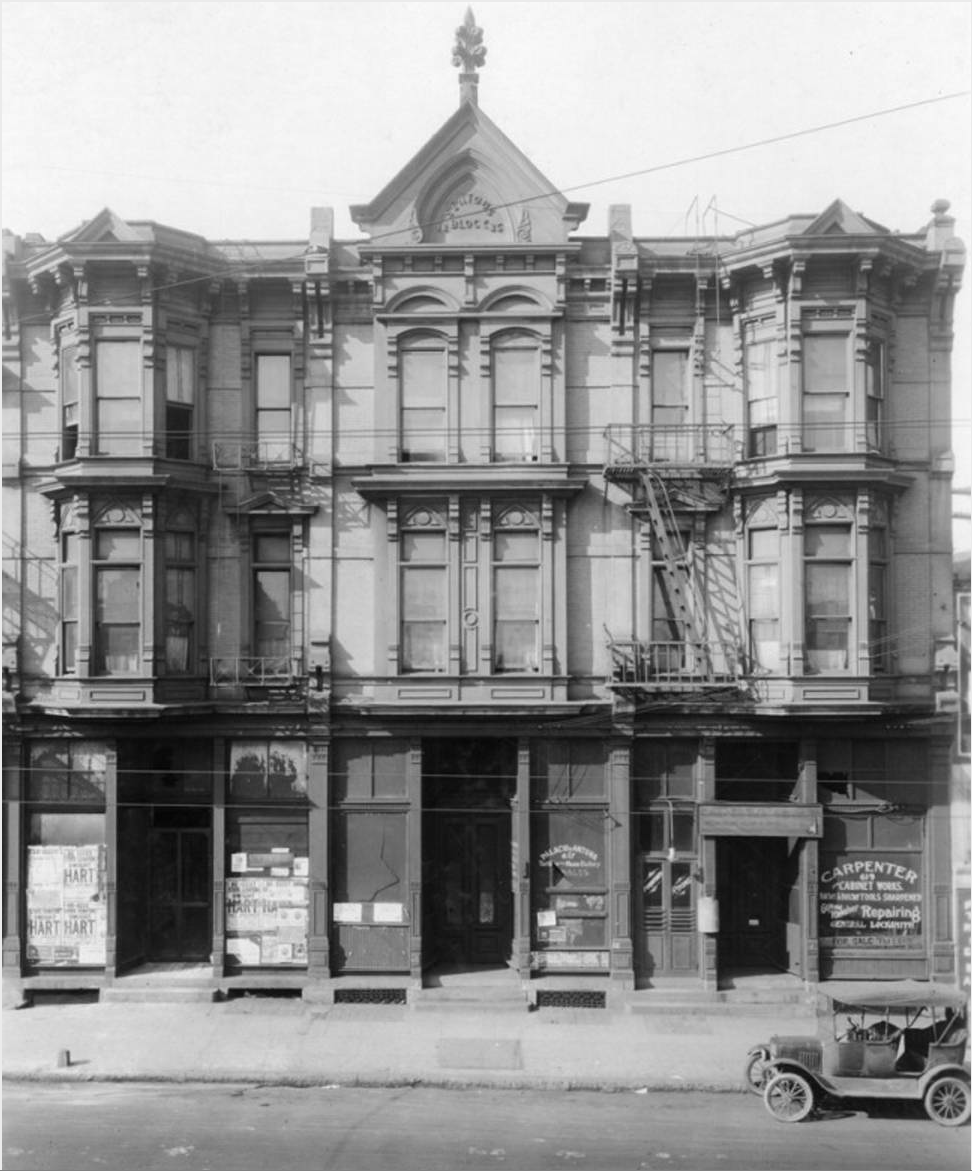
1920 view of Sentous Building, N. Main St. near Plaza, designed 1886

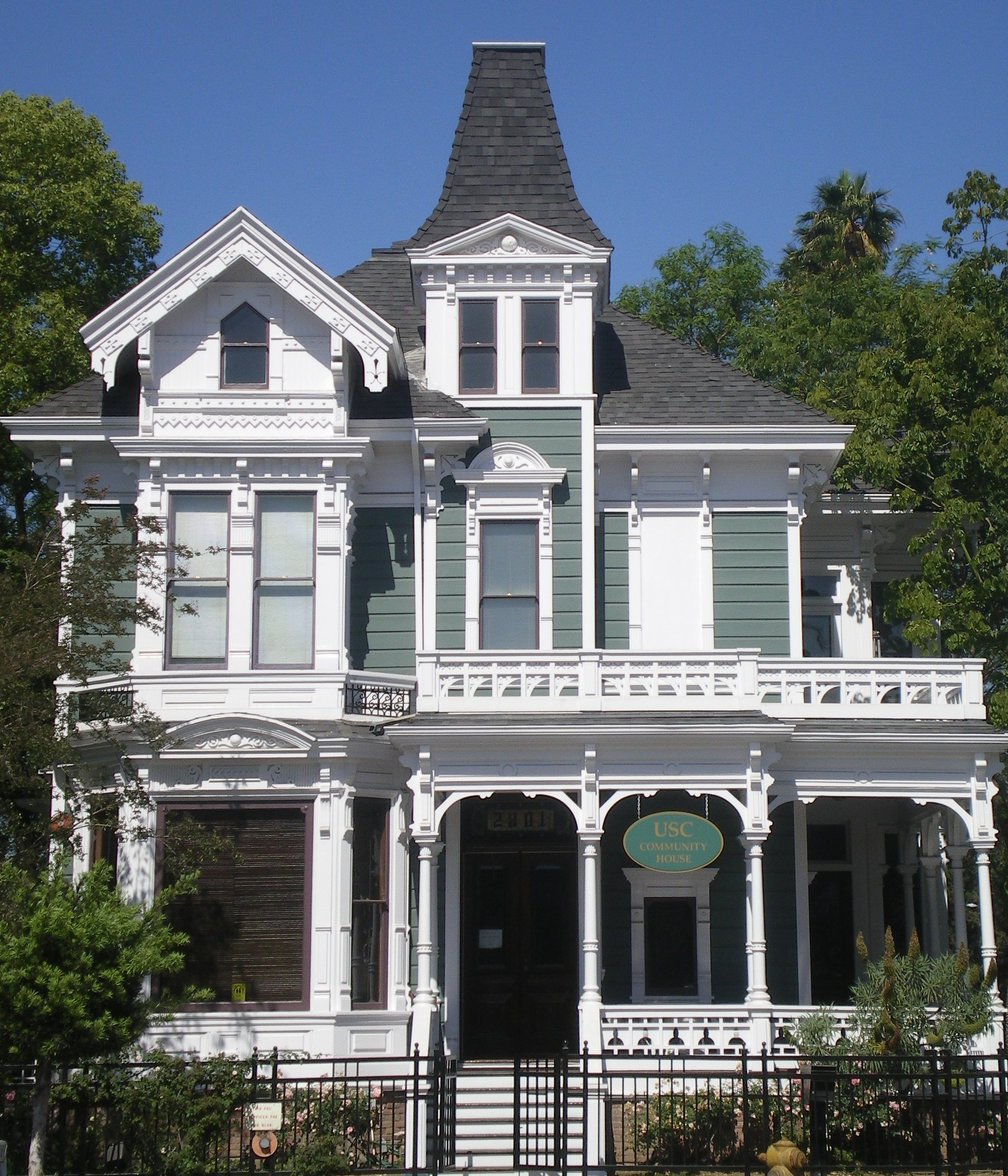
Forthmann House
