= West Adams Heritage Association =

Historic preservation organization in Los Angeles

Coordinates: 34°02′04″N 118°18′25″W

- Abbreviation: WAHA
- Founded: 1983 in Los Angeles, California
- Type: Historic Preservation
- Legal status: nonprofit 501(c)(3) organization
- Location: 2263 S. Harvard Boulevard Los Angeles, CA 90018
- Website: www.westadamsheritage.org

Founded in 1983, the West Adams Heritage Association (WAHA) is an historic preservation organization in Los Angeles, California. It is a tax-exempt non-profit organization that is focused on the preservation of the West Adams section of the city.

As stated on their website: "West Adams is located just south and west of Downtown and contains the city's largest concentration of Victorian and Craftsman homes, five of the city's Los Angeles Historic Preservation Overlay Zones, and a concentration of Los Angeles Historic-Cultural Monuments."

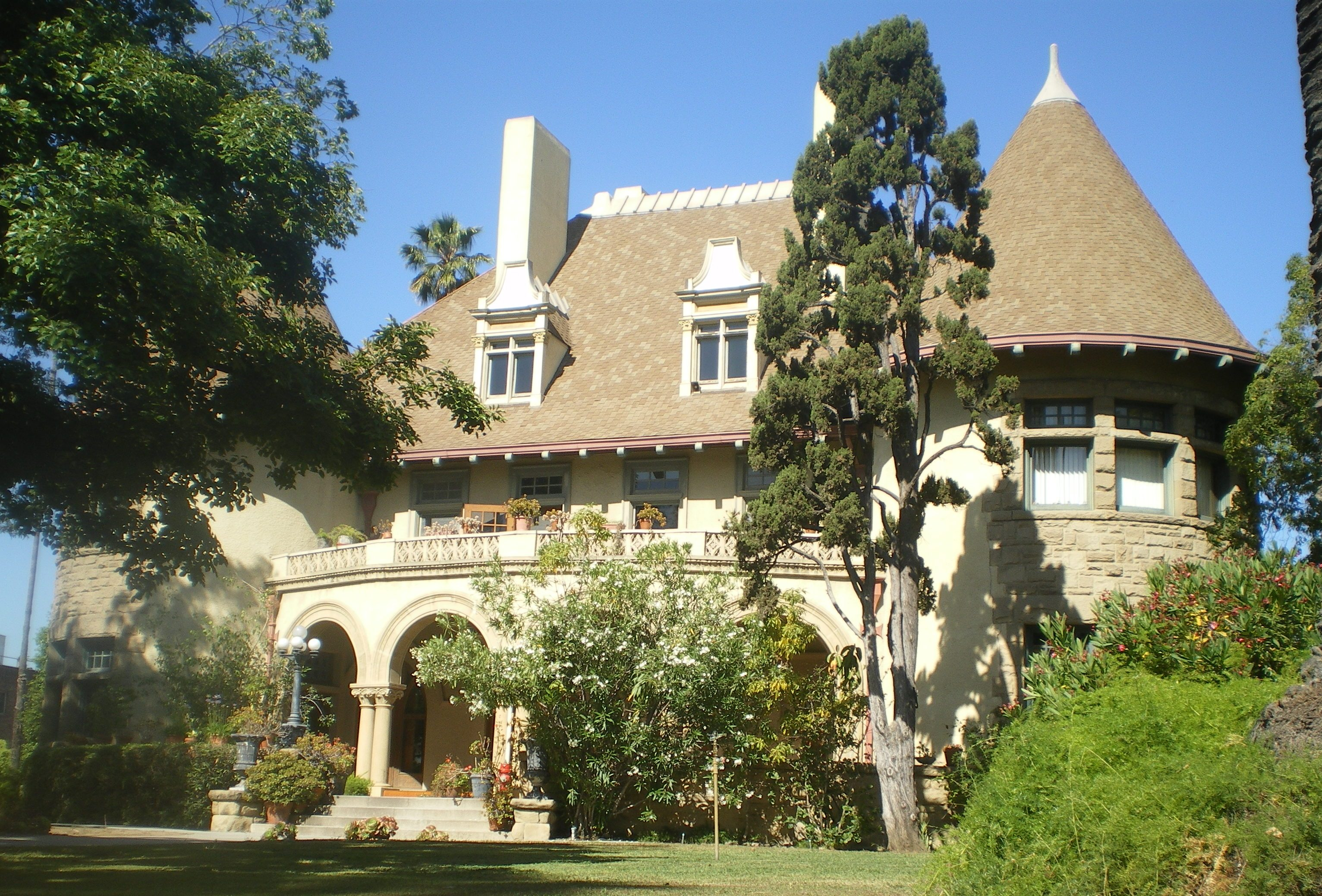
The Frederick Hastings Rindge House located at 2263 S. Harvard Boulevard.

The organization is known for sponsoring neighborhood tours, an annual holiday tour & progressive dinner party, as well as speaking out about preservation issues affecting West Adams.
