= Forthmann Carriage House =

Historic house in Los Angeles, California, United States

- Location within the Los Angeles metropolitan area
- 34°01′45″N 118°17′03″W
- Location: 812 E Edgeware Rd, Angelino Heights, Los Angeles, California

History
- Built: 1887

Site notes
- Architect: Burgess J. Reeve
- Architectural style: Victorian
- Owner: Current owners: Ithyle Griffiths & Angela Kohler

Los Angeles Historic-Cultural Monument
- Designated: October 4, 1972
- Reference no.: 103

The Forthmann Carriage House, is a Los Angeles Historic-Cultural Monument (No. 103) located in Angelino Heights, Los Angeles, California. It is a 1,000 sq. ft. Victorian style carriage house built c.1882, designed by Burgess J. Reeve.

== History ==
Sometime in the 1880s, Burgess J. Reeve designed a 4,200 square foot, eleven-room Victorian mansion for John A. Forthmann. Forthmann, a German immigrant, had made his money from founding and running the Los Angeles Soap Co. The business, most famous for its White King brand (“It takes so little”), at one point covered about sixteen acres of downtown. Forthmann died in 1922.

The Forthmann Carriage House is currently owned and in the process of restoration by Ithyle Griffiths and Angela Kohler.

It was relocated in March 2006 from its original location at 629 West 18th Street. Los Angeles, California to its current location at 812 E Edgeware Rd. Los Angeles, California. The relocation was made possible thanks to the efforts of Barbara Behm, an independent developer who restored many properties in Angeleno Heights.

== See also ==
- List of Los Angeles Historic-Cultural Monuments in South Los Angeles
