= Twentieth Street Historic District =

Historic district in California, United States

- U.S. National Register of Historic Places
- U.S. Historic district
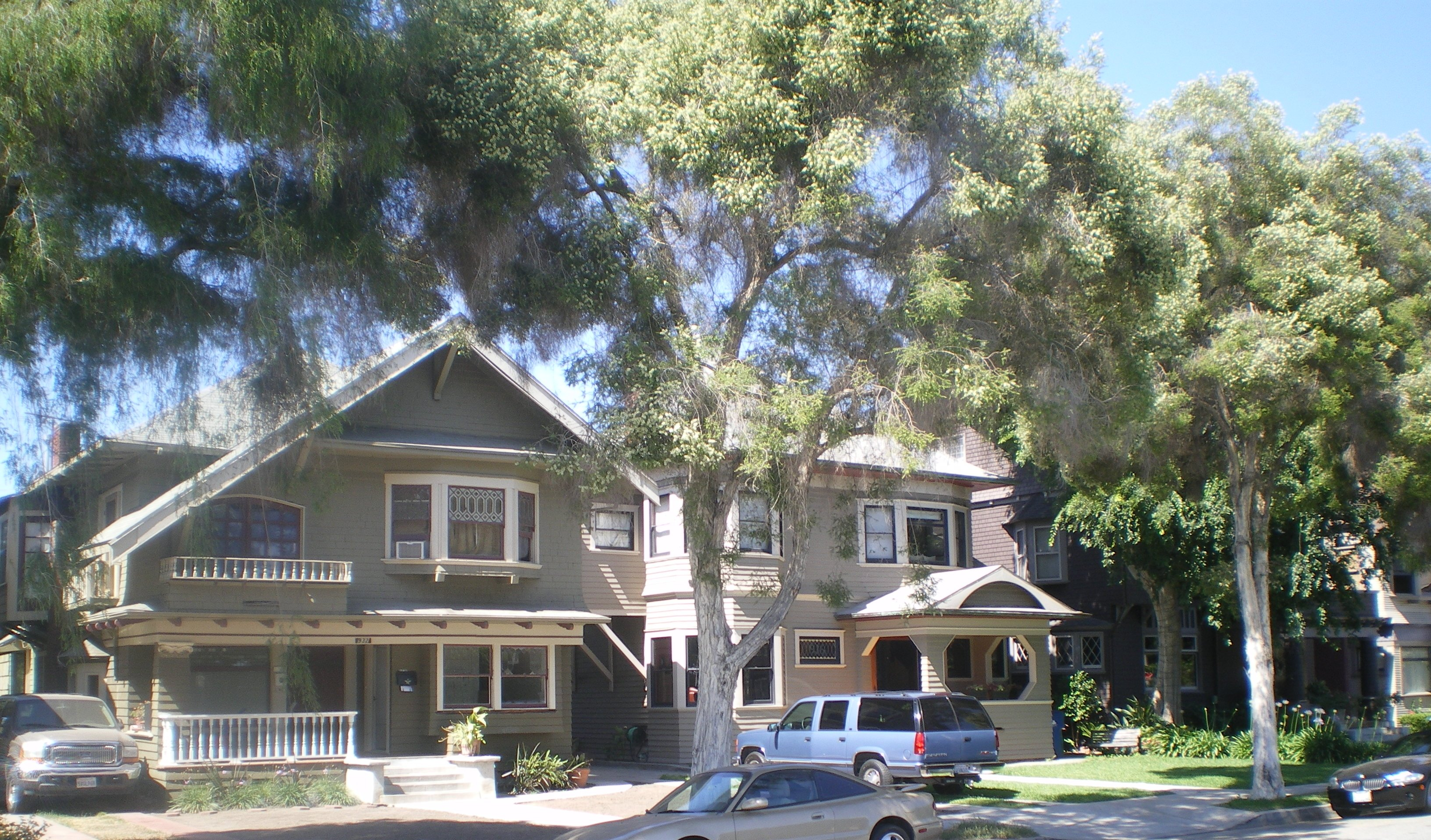
- Homes in the 20th Street Historic District, 2008

- Location within Los Angeles
- Location: 912--950 20th St. (even numbers), Los Angeles, California
- Coordinates: 34°2′9″N 118°16′44″W
- Built by: Watts, W. Wayman
- Architectural style: Bungalow/Craftsman
- NRHP reference No.: 91000915
- Added to NRHP: July 22, 1991

The Twentieth Street Historic District in Los Angeles, California, consists of a row of bungalow and Craftsman style houses in the 900 block on the south side of 20th Street, within the West Adams neighborhood.

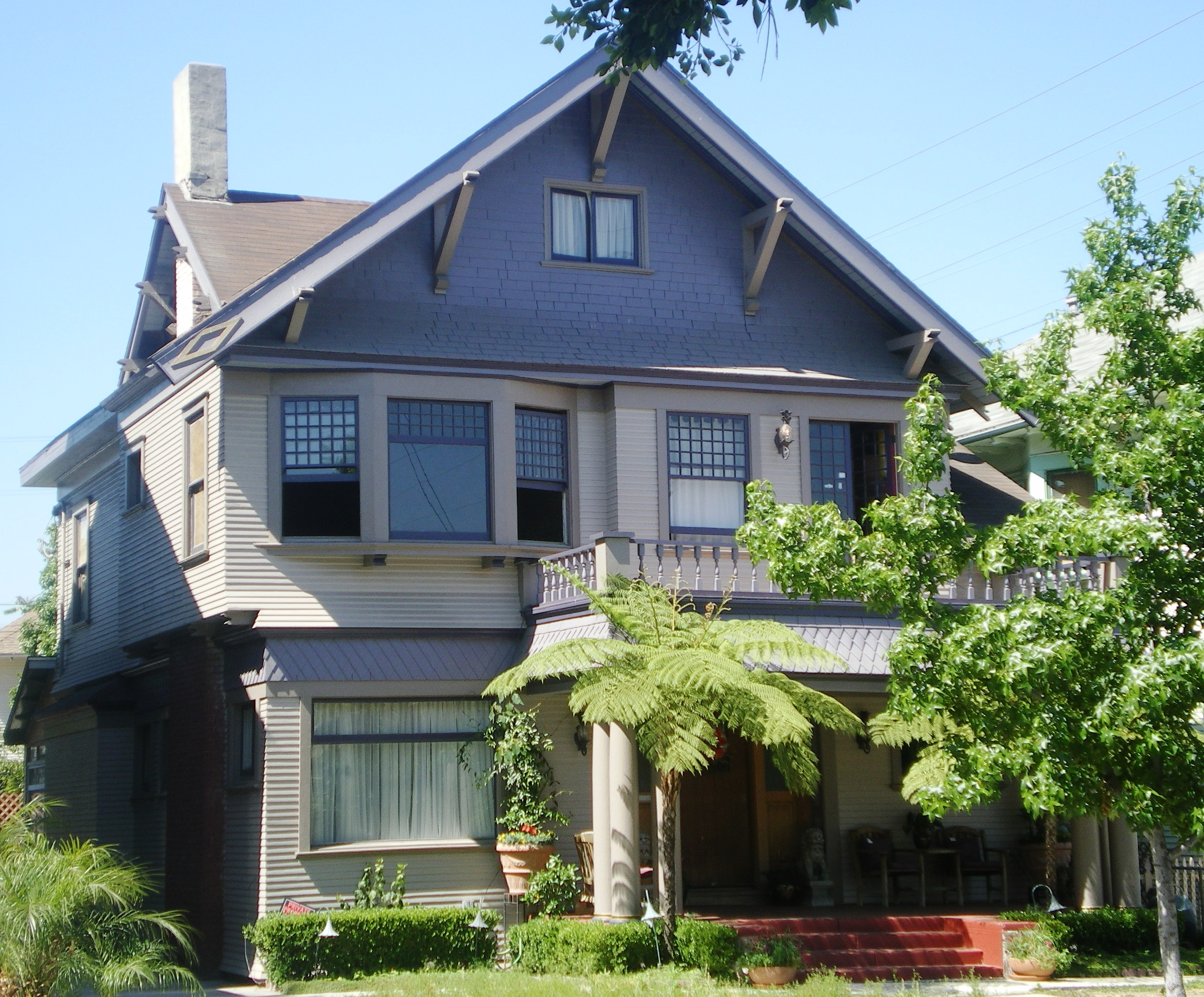
House in 20th Street Historic District, 2008

== Geography ==
The Twentieth Street Historic District is located in Central Los Angeles, southwest of the Downtown Los Angeles, in the West Adams neighborhood. It borders are: Washington Boulevard on the north, and Toberman and Oak Streets, on the west and east, respectively. It is approximately three-quarters of a mile north of the University of Southern California.

== History ==
The homes were built by W.Wayman Watts in a partnership with George Steckel and built between 1900 and 1908. The district was added to the National Register of Historic Places on June 22, 1991.

The district includes:

- Rogers-Lott House (1903), 912 West 20th Street, a rare Prairie-style bungalow.
- James Marsh House (1904), 916 West 20th Street, a two-story Craftsman house.
- Arthur C. Thorpe House (1905), 920 West 20th Street, a two-story Chalet Style Craftsman house.
- George Steckel House (1905), 924 West 20th Street, a two-story Chalet Style Craftsman.
- Ellen I. Lacy House (1905), 928 West 20th Street, a two-story Chalet Style Craftsman.
- Stevens-Brown House (1903), 936 West 20th Street, atwo story frame/overlap board Transitional Victorianhouse with a hip roof and tent-roofed turret.

== See also ==
- List of Registered Historic Places in Los Angeles
