= Adams-Normandie, Los Angeles =

Neighborhood in Los Angeles, California, United States

Adams-Normandie HPOZ
- Neighborhood
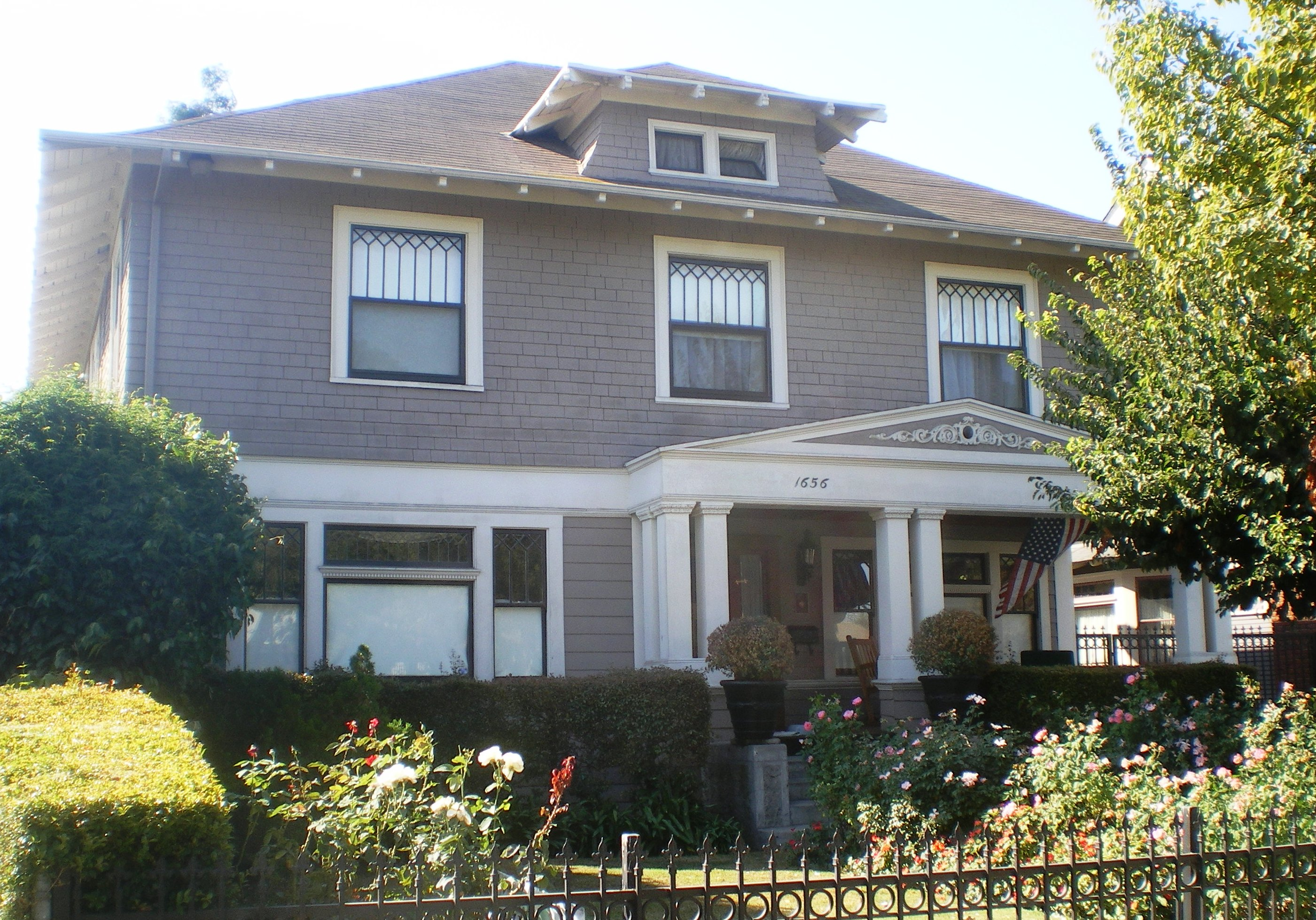
- Bernays House, 2008; Historic-Cultural Monument #780
- Interactive map of Adams-Normandie HPOZ
- Coordinates: 34.032717°N 118.300274°W
- Country: United States
- State: California
- County: Los Angeles
- City: Los Angeles
- Time zone: UTC-8 (PST)
  - Summer (DST): UTC-7 (PDT)
- ZIP Code: 90035
- Website: Adams-Normandie HPOZ

Adams-Normandie is a Historic Preservation Overlay Zone (HPOZ) in South Los Angeles, California.

== History ==
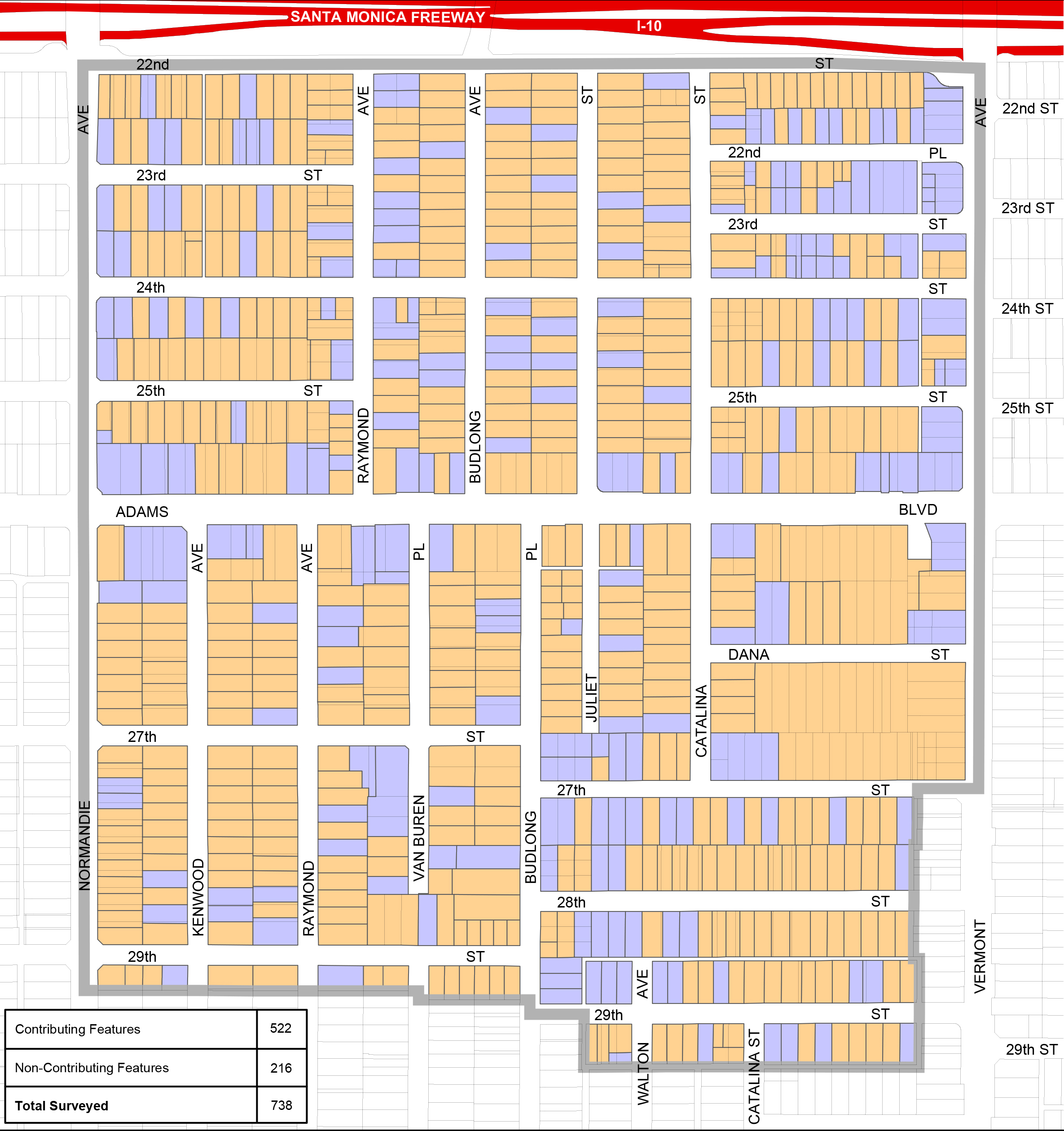
Adams-Normandie Map

The HPOZ was originally named West Adams-Normandie HPOZ. According to the HPOZ Preservation Plan, "At the beginning of the 20th century the West Adams–Normandie area was one of Los Angeles’ most prestigious communities." The Van Buren Place Historic District, listed in the National Register of Historic Places, is located within the HPOZ.

The neighborhood’s historic status was adopted by the Los Angeles City Council on December 9, 2010.

== Geography ==
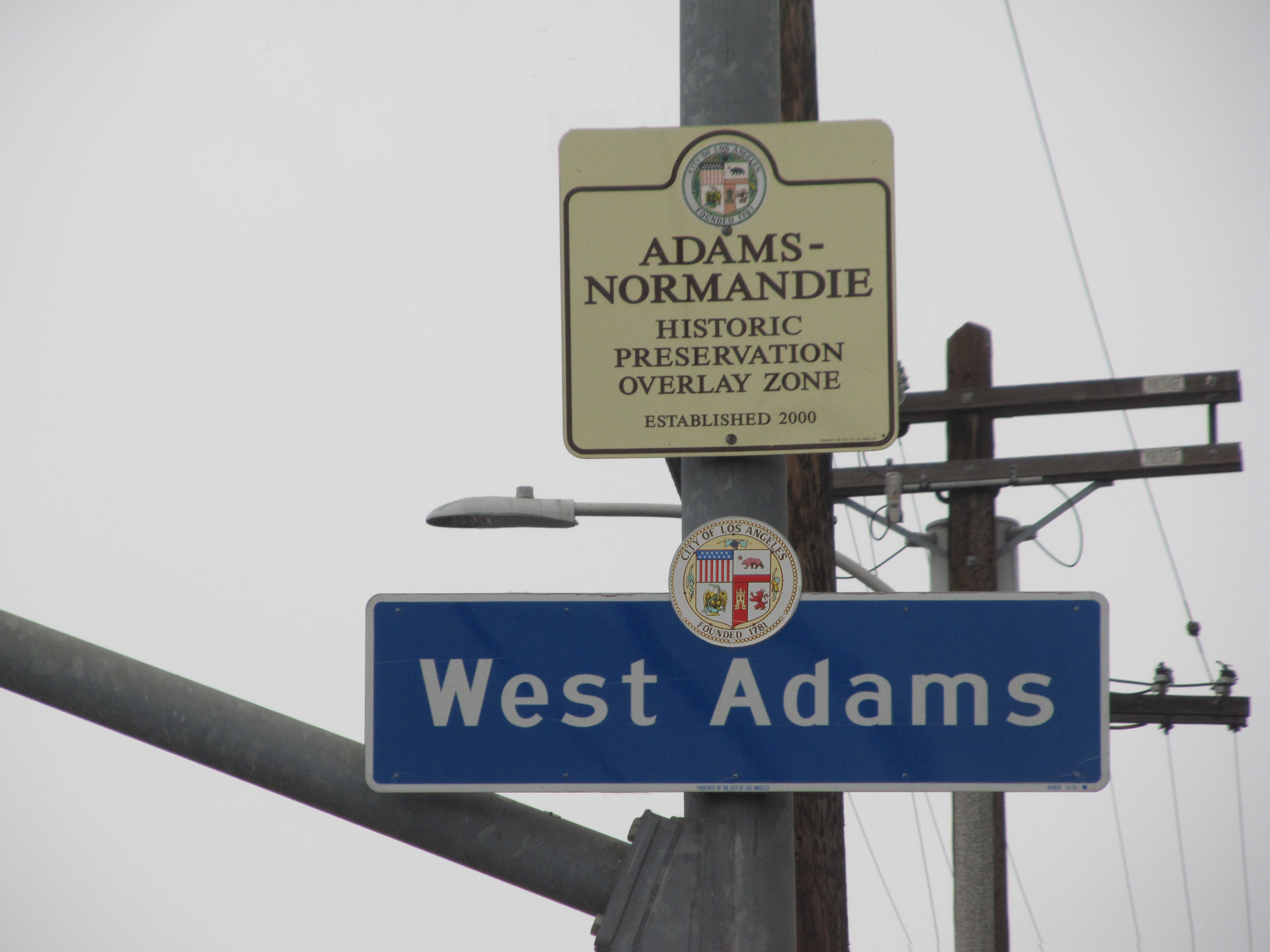
Adams-Normandie HPOZ signage in West Adams, Los Angeles

Located in the West Adams district of Los Angeles, the Adams-Normandie HPOZ is bounded by the Santa Monica Freeway on the north, Normandie Avenue on the west, Vermont Avenue on the east and 29th Street on the south.

In 2009, a year before the HPOZ was adopted, the Mapping L.A. project of the Los Angeles Times incorrectly reported the western boundary as Western Avenue.

== Historic-Cultural Monuments ==
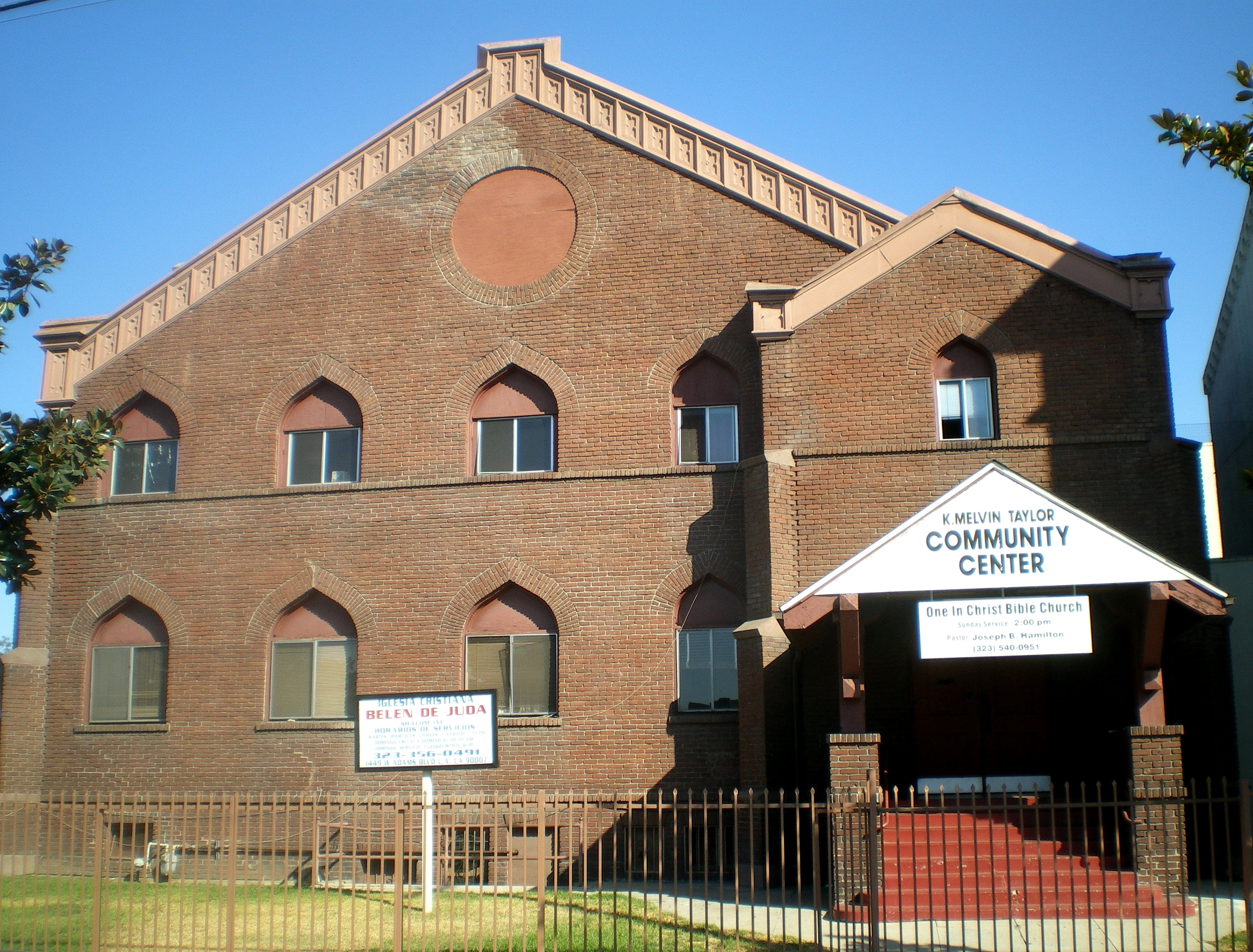
First African Methodist Episcopal Zion Cathedral, 2008

The following Historic-Cultural Monuments are located within the boundaries of the Adams-Normandie HPOZ:

- First African Methodist Episcopal Zion Cathedral & Community Center - 1449 W. Adams Boulevard. Historic Cultural Monument 341, designated January 22, 1988.
- Bernays House - 1656 W. 25th Street. Historic Cultural Monument 780, designated May 7, 2004.

== Demographics ==
=== 2000 ===
A total of 17,596 residents lived in Adams-Normandie's 0.81 square miles, according to the 2000 U.S. census—averaging 21,948 people per square mile, among the highest population densities in both the city and the county.

The median age was 26, young for the city and the county, and the percentages of residents aged 11 to 34 were among the county's highest. There were 839 families headed by single parents; the rate of 24.4% was considered high for both the city and the county.

Within the neighborhood, Latinos made up 62.2% of the population, while black people were 24.8%. Other ethnicities were white people, 5.6%; Asian, 5.2%; and other, 2.1%. Mexico and El Salvador were the most common places of birth for the 46.7% of the residents who were born abroad, considered a high percentage of foreign-born for the city as a whole.

=== 2008 ===
The median household income in 2008 dollars was $29,606, considered low for both the city and county. The percentage of households earning $20,000 or less was high, compared to the county at large. The average household size of 3.2 people was also considered high. Renters occupied 79.4% of the housing units, and homeowners occupied the rest. Only 9.5% of Adams-Normandie residents 25 and older held a four-year bachelor's degree, a low percentage for both the city and the county. The percentage of residents age 25 and older with less than a high school diploma was high for the county.

== Education ==
The following public schools are within the boundaries of Adams-Normandie:

- Vermont Avenue Elementary School (LAUSD) - 1435 West 27th Street.

== Recreation and parks ==
The following public parks are within the boundaries of Adams-Normandie:

- Loren Miller Recreation Center - 2717 Halldale Avenue.
- Richardson Family Park - 2700 South Budlong Avenue.

== See also ==
- Los Angeles Historic Preservation Overlay Zone
- List of districts and neighborhoods of Los Angeles
