= Van Buren Place Historic District =

- U.S. National Register of Historic Places
- U.S. Historic district
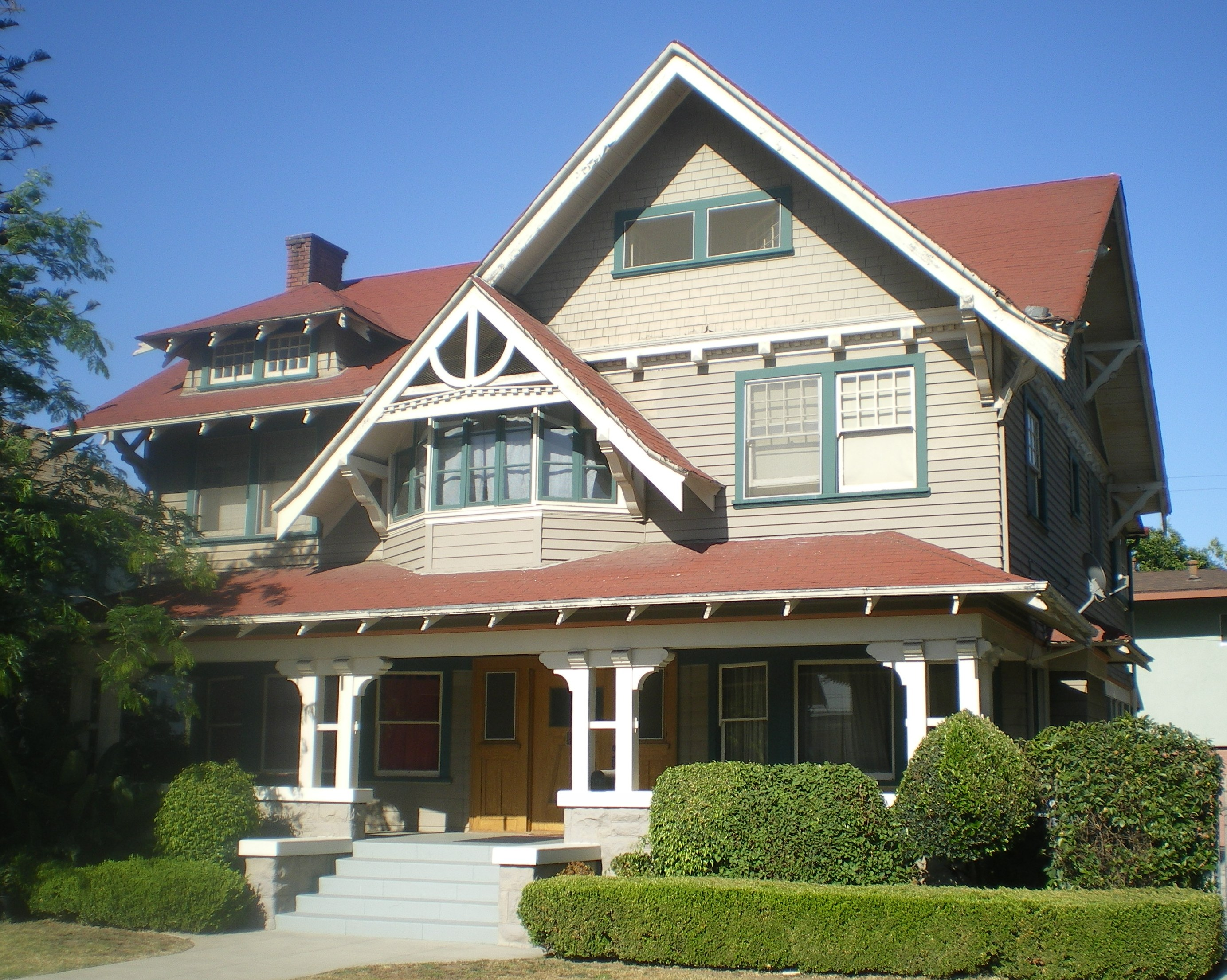
- House in Van Buren Place Historic District

- Location within Los Angeles
- Location: 2620--2657 Van Buren Place, West Adams, Los Angeles
- Coordinates: 34°1′55″N 118°17′45″W
- Architect: Clark, Percy H., Co., Inc.
- Architectural style: Bungalow/Craftsman, Shingle Style
- NRHP reference No.: 89001103
- Added to NRHP: August 10, 1989

The Van Buren Place Historic District is located in the West Adams district of Los Angeles, California.

== Geography ==
A designated Historic District listed on the National Register of Historic Places, it is located in the West Adams district of Los Angeles. It consists of the 2600 block of Van Buren Place.

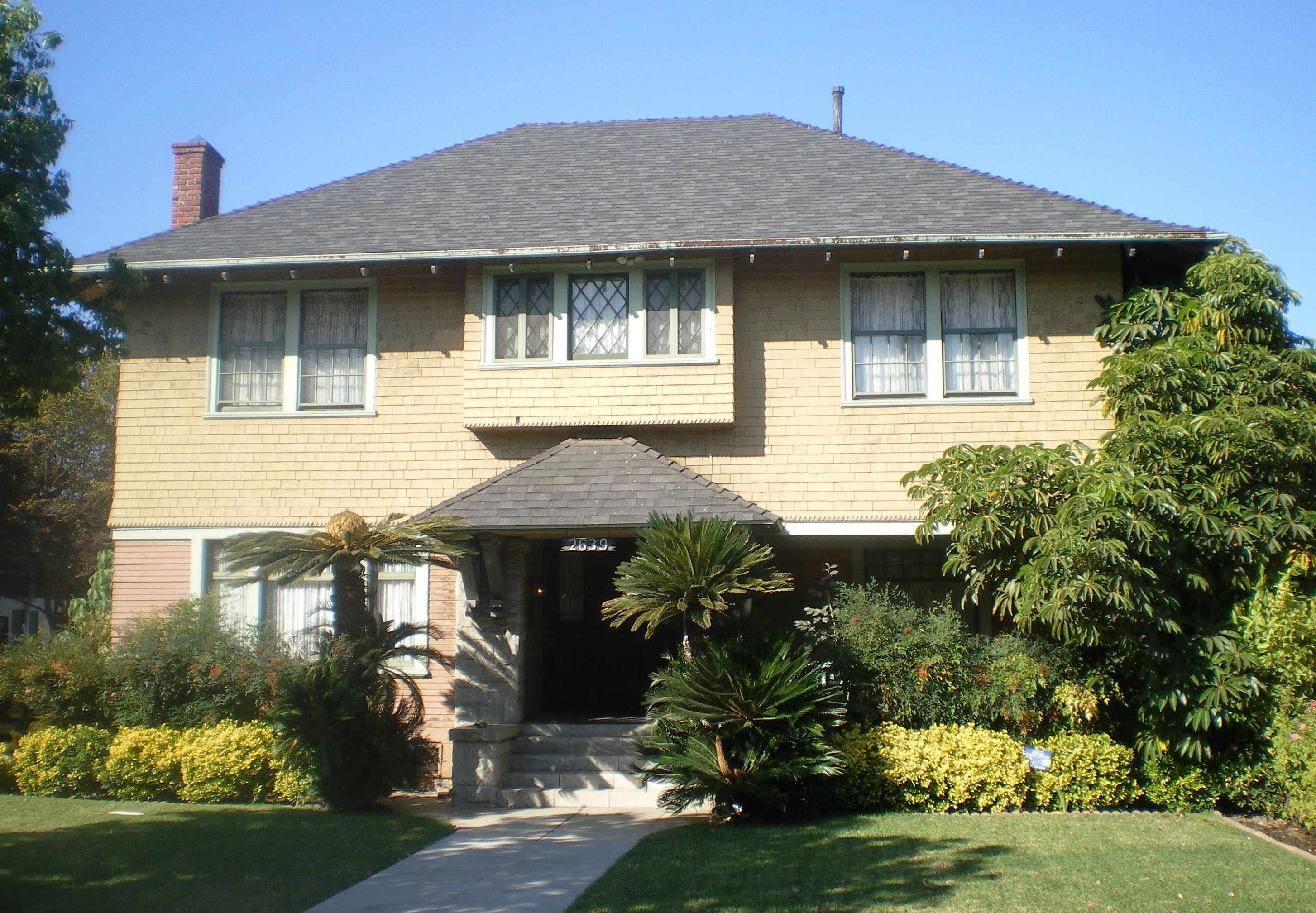
Percy H. Clark Residence, 2008

== History ==
The Van Buren Place Historic District consists of Craftsman, Shingle-Craftsman and Tudor-Craftsman style homes built between 1903 and 1916. The area was founded by Percy H. Clark who built six of the homes.

In 1989, the district was added to the National Register of Historic Places.

In 1999, the Percy H. Clark Residence, located at 2639 S. Van Buren Place, was designated as Los Angeles Historic Cultural Monument #672.

In 2000, the Furlong house, located at 2657 S. Van Buren Place, was designated as Los Angeles Historic Cultural Monument #678.

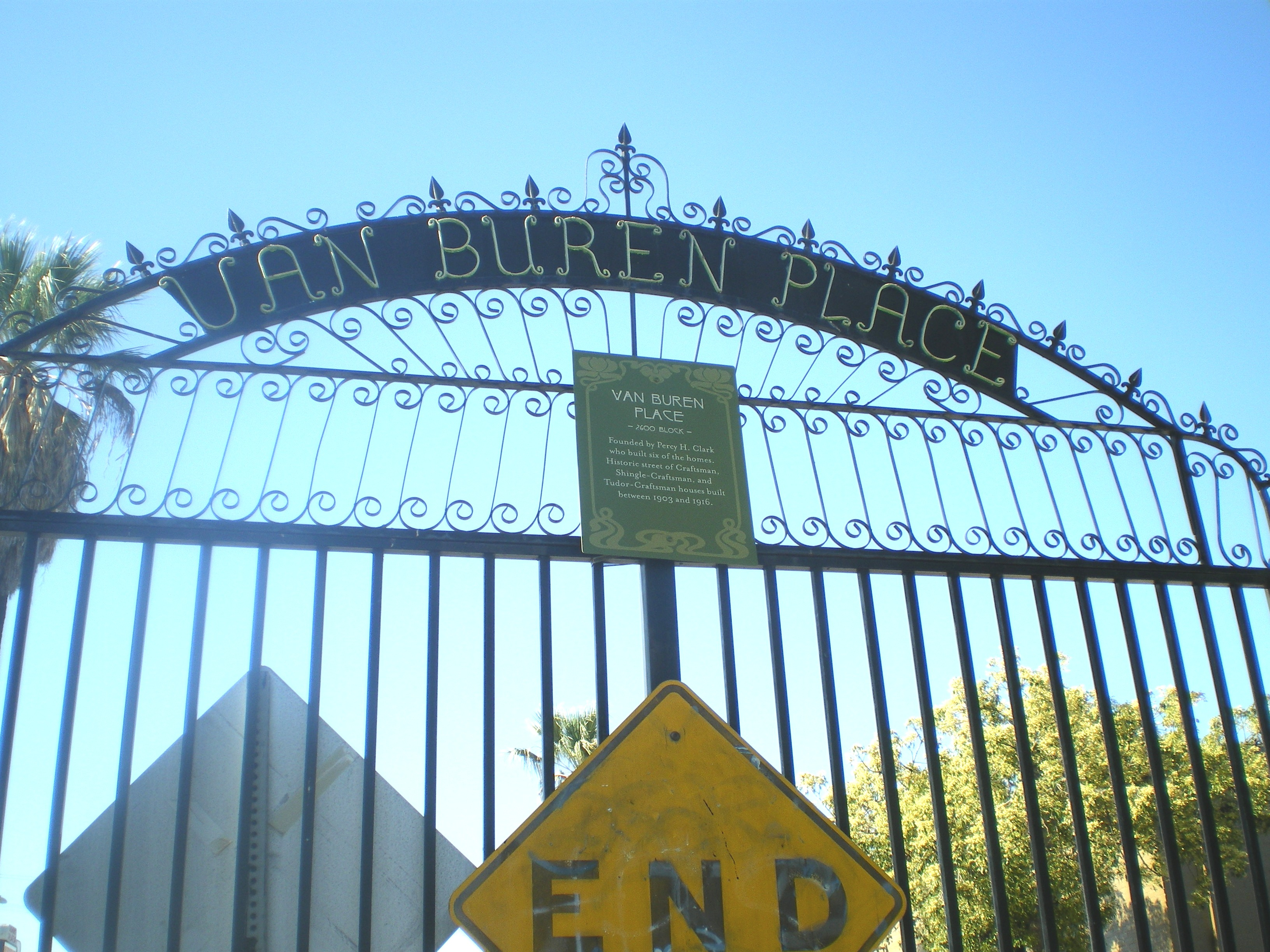
Gate to Van Buren Place, 2008

== See also ==
- List of Registered Historic Places in Los Angeles
- West Adams, Los Angeles
