= List of Los Angeles Historic-Cultural Monuments in South Los Angeles =

This is a list of Los Angeles Historic-Cultural Monuments in South Los Angeles, California. In total, there are over 144 Historic-Cultural Monuments (HCM) in the South Los Angeles region, which includes the West Adams, Exposition Park, and University of Southern California campus areas. It also includes historic sites in Watts (including Simon Rodia's Watts Towers), Baldwin Hills, Crenshaw, Jefferson Park, and Leimert Park. Further, certain historic sites in Arlington Heights, Harvard Heights and Mid-City neighborhoods below Washington Boulevard are identified by the Los Angeles Department of City Planning as being in South Los Angeles, and are included here. They are designated by the city's Cultural Heritage Commission. There is also a separate list below identifying other historic sites in the area that have not been designated as HCMs, but which have been recognized as California Historical Landmarks or have been listed on the National Register of Historic Places.

== Overview of the Historic-Cultural Monuments in South Los Angeles ==
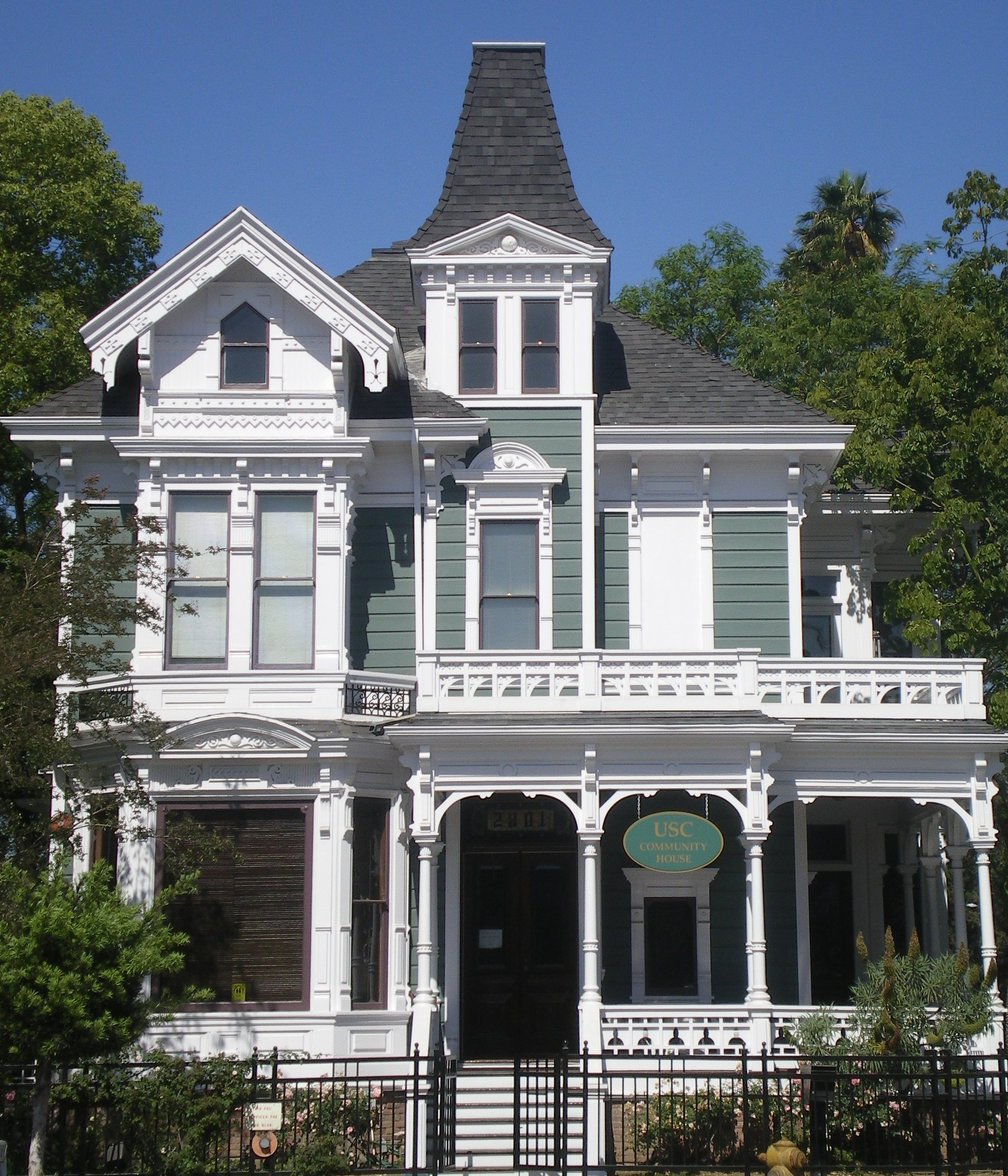
Forthmann House, 2014

National Historic Landmarks: South Los Angeles includes some of the city's most historic sites, including three National Historic Landmarks. The sites receiving this high designation are: (1) the Los Angeles Memorial Coliseum, built in 1923, and used as the principal site of the 1932 and 1984 Summer Olympic Games; (2) the Watts Towers (HCM #15), a collection of 17 interconnected structures, two of which reach heights of over 99 feet (30 m), built by Italian immigrant construction worker Simon Rodia in his spare time from 1921 to 1954; and (3) Baldwin Hills Village (HCM #174), an innovative planned community built in the 1930s with large open grassy areas and trees.

West Adams: A significant concentration of historic sites in the South Los Angeles region are in the West Adams district, which stretches "roughly from Figueroa Street on the east to West Boulevard on the west, and from Pico Boulevard on the north to Jefferson Boulevard on the south." The West Adams district was one of the city's most affluent areas from the 1890s through the 1920s. Many of the area's mansions, Victorian homes, and American Craftsman bungalows have been preserved. The area's 70 Historic-Cultural Monuments include some of the city's most renowned landmarks, such as the William Andrews Clark Memorial Library (HCM #28) operated by UCLA and the Frederick Hastings Rindge House (HCM #95) built by a Bostonian who owned all of Malibu.

Jefferson Park: Through the 20th century, Jefferson Park was variously settled by Japanese-American, African-American, and Louisiana Creole communities. The neighborhood is known for its concentration of historic American Craftsman houses, and a section of the neighborhood is a City of Los Angeles Historic Preservation Overlay Zone (HPOZ). Notable Historic-Cultural Monuments include the Westminster Presbyterian Church (HCM #229), and the Jefferson Branch Library.

USC, Exposition Park, and North University Park: To the east of West Adams and Jefferson Park is the campus of the University of Southern California, Exposition Park, and the neighborhood of North University Park, which contains the North University Park Historic District and the Menlo Avenue–West Twenty-ninth Street Historic District. The important sites in these neighborhoods include the L.A. Coliseum, the Shrine Auditorium (HCM #139) (the site of eleven Academy Awards ceremonies between 1947 and 2001), the Natural History Museum of Los Angeles County, oil baron Edward Doheny's Chester Place mansion (HCM #30), the castle-like Stimson House (HCM #212) that survived a dynamite attack in 1896, the picturesque Victorian Forthmann House (HCM #103), the Exposition Park Rose Garden, USC's Widney Hall (HCM #70) (the oldest university building in Southern California, in continuous use since 1880), and the birthplace of two-time U.S. presidential candidate Adlai Stevenson (HCM #35).

Vermont Square, Watts and South L.A.: This area includes the city's oldest library building, the Vermont Square Branch (HCM #264), built in 1913 in the Vermont Square neighborhood. It is an Italian Renaissance style building with Prairie style proportions built with a grant from Andrew Carnegie. The Watts Station was designated as a Historic-Cultural Monument (HCM #36) shortly after the Watts Riots in 1965. The old wooden railway station, built in 1904, was the only building along Watts' main thoroughfare (which became known as "Charcoal Alley") to survive the riots. The station became a symbol of continuity, hope and renewal for the Watts community. Also in South Los Angeles is the Ralph J. Bunche House (HCM #159). The boyhood home of Ralph J. Bunche, the first African-American to win the Nobel Peace Prize, it has been preserved as a museum.

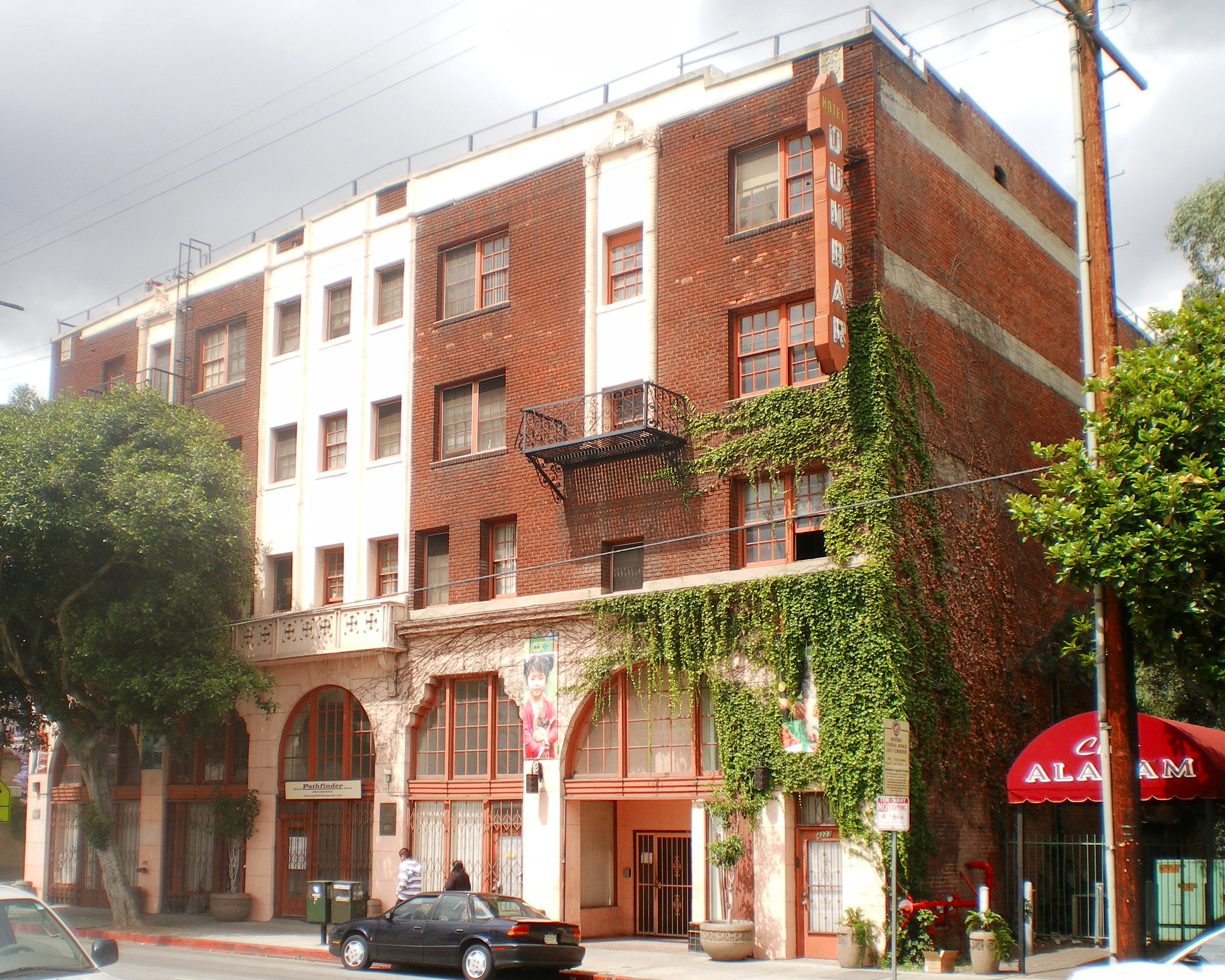
The Dunbar Hotel, 2008.

Churches: Many of the city's most recognizable churches are also located in southern Los Angeles, including the domed Second Church of Christ Scientist (HCM #57), the second Catholic church in the city to be consecrated, St. Vincent de Paul (HCM #72), the city's Episcopal cathedral, Saint John's, its Greek Orthodox cathedral, Saint Sophia (HCM #120), the Gothic McCarty Memorial Christian Church, which became one of the first white Protestant churches to be racially integrated in the 1950s, the Lombard Romanesque Second Baptist Church (HCM #200) designed in 1925 by noted African-American architect, Paul R. Williams, and the Richardsonian Romanesque First African Methodist Episcopal Zion Cathedral (HCM #341).

African-American Music History: The area also includes sites that have played an important role in the city's musical history. The Ray Charles Worldwide Offices and Studios were designated as a Historic-Cultural Monument (HCM #776) in 2004, and the Dunbar Hotel (HCM #70) was at the center of the thriving Central Avenue jazz scene in the 1930s and 1940s. After hosting the first national convention of the NAACP to be held in the western United States, the Dunbar hosted Duke Ellington, Cab Calloway, Billie Holiday, Louis Armstrong, Lionel Hampton, Count Basie, Lena Horne and other jazz legends. Former heavyweight champion Jack Johnson also ran a nightclub at the Dunbar in the 1930s. And the Lincoln Theatre (HCM #744), built in 1927, was once the crown jewel of Central Avenue, referred to by some as the West Coast's version of New York City's Apollo Theater.

== Current and former Historic-Cultural Monuments ==
| HCM # | Landmark name | Image | Date designated | Locality | Neighborhood | Description |
|---|---|---|---|---|---|---|
| 15 (1027) (2373) | Towers of Simon Rodia (Watts Towers) | | March 1, 1963 | 1765 E. 107th St. 33°56′19″N 118°14′28″W | Watts | Towers constructed by Italian immigrant Simon Rodia between 1921 and 1954 |
| 18 | Hyde Park Congregational Church (site of) | | May 10, 1963 | 6501 Crenshaw Blvd. 33°58′49″N 118°19′52″W | Hyde Park | Tiny wooden church with two front-corner towers; demolished in 1964; delisted 1/1/1964 |
| 28 | William Andrews Clark Memorial Library | | October 9, 1964 | 2520 Cimarron St. 34°01′59″N 118°18′51″W | West Adams - West Adams Terrace | Renaissance Revival building completed in 1926; designed by Robert D. Farquhar |
| 30 | Oliver G. Posey-Edward L. Doheny Residence | | January 8, 1965 | 8 Chester Pl. 34°01′50″N 118°16′37″W | West Adams | Mansion purchased in 1901 by oil businessman Edward L. Doheny; designed by Eisen & Hunt; now part of Mount St. Mary's College campus |
| 35 | Birthplace of Adlai E. Stevenson II | | August 20, 1965 | 2639 Monmouth Ave. 34°01′54″N 118°17′06″W | West Adams - North University Park - North University Park Historic District | Site of birthplace of two-time U.S. presidential candidate Adlai Stevenson II |
| 36 (2372) | Watts Station | | December 3, 1965 | 1686 E. 103rd St. 33°56′35″N 118°14′34″W | Watts | Electric railway station built in early 1900s; the only building along the area known as "Charcoal Alley" to survive the Watts Riots |
| 57 (2364) | Second Church of Christ Scientist, Los Angeles | | July 17, 1968 | 946–948 West Adams Blvd. 34°01′51″N 118°16′59″W | West Adams - North University Park | Built in 1910 and designed by Alfred Rosenheim, purchased by the Art of Living foundation in 2009 |
| 70 (1025) | Widney Hall (Alumni Hall) | | December 16, 1970 | 650 Childs Way; 34°01′08″N 118°16′56″W | USC Campus | Oldest university building in Southern California, in continuous use since 1880 |
| 72 | Automobile Club of Southern California | | February 3, 1971 | 2601 S. Figueroa St. 34°01′41″N 118°16′35″W | West Adams | Spanish colonial headquarters building erected in 1922; designed by Sumner Hunt and Silas Reese Burns |
| 90 | St. Vincent de Paul Church | | July 11, 1971 | 621 W. Adams Blvd. 34°01′43″N 118°16′34″W | West Adams | Second Roman Catholic church in Los Angeles to be consecrated; designed by Albert C. Martin Sr. |
| 95 (2363) | Rindge House | | February 23, 1972 | 2263 S. Harvard St. 34°02′03″N 118°18′25″W | West Adams | Mansion built in 1906 for Frederick H. Rindge; designed by Frederick Roehrig in Chateauesque style |
| 103 | Forthmann House (and Carriage House) | | October 4, 1972 | 2801 S. Hoover Blvd. 34°01′45″N 118°17′03″W | West Adams - North University Park - North University Park Historic District | Victorian house built in the 1880s; designed by Burgess J. Reeve; relocated in 1989 from original location |
| 117 | Residence | | April 4, 1973 | 2218 S. Harvard Blvd. 34°02′11″N 118°18′23″W | West Adams | American Colonial Revival House built in approximately 1905 |
| 120 | Saint Sophia Cathedral | | June 6, 1973 | 1324 S. Normandie Ave. 34°02′44″N 118°17′58″W | Byzantine-Latino Quarter | Greek Orthodox cathedral designed by Kalionzes, Klingerman & Walker in the Byzantine style, dedicated in 1952 |
| 127 | Exposition Club House | | May 1, 1974 | 3990 Menlo Ave. 34°00′41″N 118°17′23″W | Exposition Park | Spanish Colonial Revival building completed in 1920s in Exposition Park |
| 128 | Hancock Memorial Museum | | May 15, 1974 | 3616 University Ave. | USC Campus | Large mansion built by the Hancock family at Wilshire Blvd. and Vermont Ave., circa 1900; razed in 1938, though four rooms were moved in their entirety to the USC campus |
| 131 (2366) | Dunbar Hotel (Somerville Hotel) | Dunbar Hotel, 2008 | September 4, 1974 | 4225 S. Central Ave. 34°00′24″N 118°15′24″W | Central Avenue | Focal point of the Central Avenue African-American community in the 1930s and 1940s. |
| 139 (2315) | Shrine Auditorium | | March 5, 1975 | 665 W. Jefferson Blvd. 34°01′23″N 118°16′53″W | West Adams - North University Park | Theater seating 6,700 is one of the largest in the United States and was the prior site of the Academy Awards. Also known as Al Malaikah Temple. |
| 159 (2321) | Ralph J. Bunche House | | July 27, 1976 | 1221 E. 40th Pl. 34°00′37″N 118°15′13″W | South Los Angeles | Home of Nobel Peace Prize winner in his youth |
| 174 | Village Green (Baldwin Hills Village) | | May 4, 1977 | 5112–5595 Village Green; 34°01′10″N 118°21′39″W | Baldwin Hills | Urban housing project completed in 1942 featuring extensive grassy areas and open spaces, which was designed by Reginald D. Johnson, Wilson and Merril, Robert E. Alexander. AIA 1972 award. |
| 179 | Residence (site of) | | August 17, 1977 | 919 W. 20th St. 34°02′09″N 118°16′45″W | West Adams - Twentieth Street Historic District | Site of Queen Anne Victorian house built in 1908; demolished in 1978 |
| 185 | President's House (site of) | | April 19, 1978 | 7851 Budlong Ave. 33°58′05″N 118°17′47″W | South Los Angeles | Mission style house built in 1912 (now the location of the Crenshaw Christian Center Faith Dome) |
| 197 (2319) | Britt House | | October 18, 1978 | 2141 W. Adams Blvd. 34°01′59″N 118°18′46″W | West Adams - West Adams Terrace | Classical Revival house built in 1910, designed by Alfred F. Rosenheim; used today as the headquarters of the LA84 Foundation |
| 200 | Second Baptist Church | | October 18, 1978 | 2412 Griffith Ave. 34°01′16″N 118°15′23″W | South Los Angeles | Lombard Romanesque church built in 1925, designed by Paul R. Williams; long a hub of the African American community |
| 212 (2367) | Stimson House | | May 16, 1979 | 2421 S. Figueroa St. 34°01′46″N 118°16′33″W | West Adams | Richardsonian Romanesque mansion; built in 1891; originally home of lumber and banking millionaire; survived a dynamite attack by a blackmailer in 1896; later occupied by a brewer, a fraternity house, student housing and a convent |
| 214 | Mount Carmel High School (former site) | | June 6, 1979 | 7011 S. Hoover St. 33°58′33″N 118°17′15″W | South Los Angeles | Spanish Revival style Catholic high school built in 1934. Demolished in 1983. |
| 229 | Westminster Presbyterian Church | | June 11, 1980 | 2230 W. Jefferson Blvd. 34°01′31″N 118°19′11″W | Jefferson Park | First African American Presbyterian congregation in Los Angeles; Spanish Revival style structure built in 1904 |
| 230 (2362) | Villa Maria (Ramsay-Durfee House) | | June 12, 1980 | 2425 S. Western Ave. 34°02′01″N 118°18′36″W | West Adams - West Adams Terrace | Tudor Revival mansion designed by Frederick Louis Roehrig and built in 1908; bought by Brothers of St. John of God in 1978 |
| 240 | Residence | | April 9, 1981 | 2703 S. Hoover St. 34°01′48″N 118°17′03″W | West Adams | Queen Anne style home built circa 1891, designed by Bradbeer and Ferris |
| 241 | Sunshine Mission | | April 9, 1981 | 2600 S. Hoover St. 34°01′52″N 118°17′01″W | West Adams | Built in 1893, it has housed an experimental kindergarten, a prep school for girls, the headquarters of the Dianetics Foundation, and the Sunshine Shelter for homeless women; also known as Casa de Rosas |
| 242 (2354) | Miller and Herriott Tract House | | April 9, 1981 | 1163 W. 27th St. 34°01′49″N 118°17′10″W | West Adams - North University Park - North University Park Historic District | Eastlake style house built in 1890, designed by Bradbeer and Ferris |
| 258 | Fitzgerald House | | November 5, 1982 | 3115 W. Adams Blvd. 34°01′58″N 118°19′05″W | West Adams - West Adams Terrace | Italian Gothic style house built in 1903, designed by Joseph Cather Newsom |
| 264 (2371) | Vermont Square Branch Library | | June 7, 1983 | 1201 W. 48th St. 33°59′59″N 118°17′45″W | Vermont Square | Oldest branch library in Los Angeles; built in 1913 as a Carnegie library; designed by Hunt & Burns in Beaux Arts style with Italian Renaissance influence |
| 273 | Durfee House | | January 4, 1984 | 1007 W. 24th St. 34°02′01″N 118°16′55″W | West Adams - St. James Park | Eastlake style 2-story wood-frame house built, circa 1885, for Richmond Durfee and his wife. |
| 295 | A. E. Kelly Residence | | July 12, 1985 | 1140 W. Adams Blvd. 34°01′55″N 118°17′06″W | West Adams | Queen Anne Victorian house built in the 1890s; fish-scale shingles on second floor |
| 296 | John C. Harrison Residence | | July 25, 1985 | 1160 W. 27th St. 34°01′48″N 118°17′09″W | West Adams | Queen Anne Victorian house built in 1891 with a three-story tower and wrap-around porch |
| 297 | West Adams Gardens | | August 13, 1985 | 1158-1176 W. Adams Blvd. 34°01′55″N 118°17′08″W | West Adams | Grouping of seven two-story Tudor Revival residential structures built in 1920, designed by L.A. Smith |
| 300 | Casa Camino Real | | October 29, 1985 | 1828 Oak St. 34°02′13″N 118°16′37″W | West Adams - North University Park | Eclectic structure built in 1923, designed by Morgan, Walls & Morgan; Beauz Arts exterior with elements of Art Deco and Spanish Revival styles |
| 305 (2358) | John Muir Branch Library | | June 27, 1986 | 1005 W. 64th St. 33°58′53″N 118°17′31″W | South Los Angeles | Italian Renaissance style branch library built in 1930, designed by Henry F. Withey (Ed. note: List of RHPs in L.A. states this built in 1920, here states 1930, which is it?) |
| 306 | Original Vernon Branch Library (site of) | | June 27, 1986 | 4504 S. Central Ave. 34°00′09″N 118°15′23″W | South Los Angeles | Branch library that housed large collection of books on African American history |
| 307 (2342) | Washington Irving Branch Library | | June 27, 1986 | 1803 S. Arlington Ave. 34°02′26″N 118°19′04″W | Arlington Heights | Lombardic Richardsonian Romanesque library branch built in 1926, designed by Allison & Allison |
| 330 | Angelus-Rosedale Cemetery | | December 1, 1987 | 1831 W. Washington Blvd. 34°02′26″N 118°17′53″W | West Adams | Cemetery opened in 1884 with pioneer families and 19th century funerary architecture; first in the West to operate a crematorium |
| 331 | Pacific Bell Building | | December 8, 1987 | 2755 W. 15th St. 34°02′44″N 118°18′07″W | West Adams - Harvard Heights | Spanish Mission style garage with Churrigueresque details built, circa 1922 |
| 335 | Henry J. Reuman Residence | | December 18, 1987 | 925 W. 23rd St. 34°02′01″N 118°16′49″W | West Adams - St. James Park | Queen Anne and Colonial Revival transitional style house built, circa 1898, designed by August Wackerbarth |
| 341 | First African Methodist Episcopal Zion Cathedral & Community Center | | January 22, 1988 | 1449 W. Adams Blvd. 34°01′59″N 118°17′35″W | West Adams | Richardsonian Romanesque cathedral built in 1930 for the West Adams Presbyterian Church, designed by architects H.M. Patterson and George W. Kelham |
| 344 | Institute of Musical Art | | February 23, 1988 | 3210 W. 54th St. 33°59′34″N 118°19′43″W | Leimert Park | Music school and recording studio founded in 1922 |
| 349 (2330) | Fire Station No. 18 | | March 29, 1988 | 2616 S. Hobart Blvd. 34°01′55″N 118°18′27″W | West Adams | Mission Revival fire station built in 1904, designed by John C. Parkinson |
| 350 | Ecung-Ibbetson House and Moreton Bay Fig Tree | | March 29, 1988 | 1190 W. Adams Blvd. 34°01′56″N 118°17′10″W | West Adams | Richardsonian Romanesque and Victorian home built in 1899 |
| 407 | Seyler Residence | | January 20, 1989 | 2305 Scarff St. 34°01′56″N 118°16′50″W | West Adams - St. James Park | Queen Anne style Victorian home built in 1894, designed by Abraham M. Edelman |
| 408 (2351) | Machell-Seaman House | | January 20, 1989 | 2341 Scarff St. 34°1′55″N 118°16′46″W | West Adams - St. James Park | Asymmetrical Queen Anne style Victorian home built in 1888 |
| 409 | Burkhalter Residence | | January 20, 1989 | 2309–2311 Scarff St. 34°01′58″N 118°16′49″W | West Adams - St. James Park | Queen Anne style Victorian home built in 1895 |
| 410 | Distribution Station No. 31 | | January 20, 1989 | 1035 W. 24th St. 34°02′02″N 118°16′59″W | West Adams - St. James Park | Industrial building designed by staff architects at Pacific Gas & Electric Company, built in 1925 |
| 417 | Gordon L. McDonough House | | February 21, 1989 | 2532 5th Ave. 34°02′00″N 118°19′19″W | West Adams - West Adams Terrace | American Craftsman style house built in 1908, designed by architect Frank M. Tyler |
| 419 | Walker Mansion | | March 3, 1989 | 3300 W. Adams Blvd. 34°01′56″N 118°19′12″W | West Adams - Jefferson Park | Grand Craftsman style mansion with Tudor, Mediterranean and Mission Revival influences |
| 434 | Colonel John E. Stearns Residence | | May 5, 1989 | 27 St. James Park; 34°01′54″N 118°16′49″W | West Adams - St. James Park | Classical Revival house built in 1900, designed by architect John C. Parkinson |
| 455 | Margaret T. and Bettie Mead Creighton Residence | | October 24, 1989 | 2342 Scarff St. 34°01′52″N 118°16′48″W | West Adams - St. James Park | Colonial Revival style house built in 1896 |
| 456 | Ezra T. Stimson House | | October 24, 1989 | 839 W. Adams Blvd. 34°01′50″N 118°16′50″W | West Adams | Tudor Revival house built in 1901, designed by architect Frederick Roehrig |
| 457 | Freeman G. Teed House | | October 24, 1989 | 2365 Scarff St. 34°01′54″N 118°16′51″W | West Adams - St. James Park | American Craftsman style house built in 1893 |
| 458 | Wells-Halliday Mansion | | November 3, 1989 | 2146 W. Adams Blvd. 34°01′56″N 118°18′48″W | West Adams | Dutch Colonial style house built in 1901; Craftsman style wing built in 1909 |
| 466 | Henry J. Foster Residence | | October 17, 1989 | 1030 W. 23rd St. 34°02′04″N 118°16′58″W | West Adams - St. James Park | Queen Anne style house built circa 1889 |
| 467 | Chalet Apartments | | October 27, 1989 | 2375 Scarff St. 34°01′54″N 118°16′52″W | West Adams - St. James Park | Two-story, 19-unit apartment complex built in 1913; designed by Frank M. Tyler with the appearance of a single-family house |
| 477 | Briggs Residence | | January 30, 1990 | 3734 W. Adams Blvd. 34°01′56″N 118°19′33″W | West Adams - Jefferson Park | Alpine Craftsman style house built in 1912, designed by Hudson & Munsell with steep, cross-gabled roof |
| 478 | Guasti Villa-Busby Berkeley Estate | | January 30, 1990 | 3500 W. Adams Blvd. 34°01′58″N 118°19′20″W | West Adams - Jefferson Park | Beaux Arts – Italian Renaissance style mansion, designed by Hudson & Munsell; purchased in 1936 by Busby Berkeley; now operated as the "Peace Awareness Labyrinth Gardens" |
| 479 | Dr. Grandville MacGowan Home | | January 30, 1990 | 3726 W. Adams Blvd. 34°01′56″N 118°19′32″W | West Adams - Jefferson Park | Alpine Craftsman style mansion with Tudor Revival influences, built in 1912 and designed by Hudson & Munsell |
| 487 | Sanchez Ranch | | May 1, 1990 | 3725 Don Felipe Dr. 34°00′25″N 118°20′24″W | Leimert Park | Adobe structures once part of the Rancho La Cienega o Paso de la Tijera, built in 1790 |
| 489 | Richard H. Alexander Residence | | May 30, 1990 | 2119 Estrella Ave. 34°01′57″N 118°16′35″W | West Adams | Two-story Eastlake style house built circa 1888 |
| 496 | Lycurgus Lindsay Mansion | | May 30, 1990 | 3424 W. Adams Blvd. 34°01′56″N 118°19′19″W | West Adams | Mission Revival style house built circa 1900 with tiles from Western Art Tile works owned by Lycurgus Lindsay; house designed by Charles Whittlesey |
| 497 | Charles Clifford Gibbons Residence | | June 1, 1990 | 2124 Bonsallo Ave. 34°01′58″N 118°16′37″W | West Adams | Queen Anne style house built in 1892, designed by J.H. Bradbeer |
| 498 | Lois Ellen Arnold Residence | | June 12, 1990 | 1978 Estrella Ave. 34°02′00″N 118°16′31″W | West Adams - North University Park | Queen Anne style house built in 1888 |
| 499 | Agnes B. Heimgartner Residence | | June 12, 1990 | 1982 Bonsallo Ave. 34°02′01″N 118°16′35″W | West Adams | Eastlake style house built in 1893 |
| 500 | John B. Kane Residence | | June 12, 1990 | 2122 Bonsallo Ave. 34°01′58″N 118°16′36″W | West Adams - North University Park | Eastlake cottage built in 1892, designed by Fred R. Dorn |
| 501 | Michael Shannon Residence | | June 12, 1990 | 1970 Bonsallo Ave. 34°02′02″N 118°16′34″W | West Adams - North University Park | Eastlake style townhouse built circa 1890 |
| 502 | Collins-Furthmann Mansion | | June 20, 1990 | 3691–3801 Lenawee Ave. 34°01′08″N 118°22′34″W | Baldwin Hills | |
| 507 | Hiram V. Short Residence | | November 2, 1990 | 2108–2110 1/2 Estrella Ave. 34°01′58″N 118°16′33″W | West Adams | |
| 510 | Residence | | January 11, 1991 | 1157 W. 55th St. 33°59′33″N 118°17′44″W | South Los Angeles | |
| 511 | Residence | | January 11, 1991 | 1100 W. 55th St. 33°59′31″N 118°17′38″W | South Los Angeles | |
| 512 | Church of the Advent | Church of Advent, 4976 W. Adams Blvd, Los Angeles, California, United States (Los Angeles Cultural Historical Landmark 512) | January 16, 1991 | 4976 W. Adams Blvd. 34°01′55″N 118°20′58″W | West Adams | |
| 513 | Southern California Edison Service Yard Structure | | January 15, 1991 | 615 E. 108th St. 33°56′18″N 118°15′52″W | South Los Angeles | |
| 516 (2708) | Saint John's Episcopal Church | | January 22, 1991 | 514 W. Adams Blvd. 34°01′39″N 118°16′31″W | West Adams | Romanesque Episcopal church built in 1925; now serves as Episcopal cathedral for Los Angeles |
| 517 | Residence | | January 16, 1991 | 917 E. 49th Pl. 33°59′55″N 118°15′34″W | South Los Angeles | |
| 518 | Residence | | January 16, 1991 | 1207 E. 55th St. 33°59′35″N 118°15′14″W | South Los Angeles | |
| 519 | Cockins House | | February 1, 1991 | 2653 S. Hoover St. 34°01′49″N 118°17′03″W | West Adams | |
| 548 | Korean Independence Memorial Building | | October 2, 1991 | 1368 W. Jefferson Blvd. 34°01′31″N 118°17′49″W | Jefferson Park | |
| 551 | Thomas W. Phillips Residence | | November 13, 1991 | 2215 S. Harvard Blvd. 34°02′08″N 118°18′24″W | West Adams | |
| 560 | Wright House | | May 26, 1992 | 2121–2123 Bonsallo Ave. 34°01′59″N 118°16′38″W | West Adams | |
| 561 | Allen House | | May 26, 1992 | 2125 Bonsallo Ave. 34°01′58″N 118°16′38″W | West Adams | |
| 574 | Pierce Brothers Mortuary | | February 9, 1993 | 714 W. Washington Blvd. 34°02′07″N 118°16′29″W | West Adams - North University Park | |
| 578 | Emmanuel Danish Evangelical Lutheran Church | | May 25, 1993 | 4254–4260 3rd Ave. 34°00′20″N 118°19′12″W | Leimert Park | |
| 580 | Golden State Mutual Life Insurance Building | | June 29, 1993 | 4261 S. Central Ave. 34°00′22″N 118°15′24″W | Central Avenue | Headquarters of one of the city's most successful African American-owned businesses starting in 1927; now a child development center. Architects: James Garrott and Louis Blodgett. |
| 583 | Zobelein Estate | | September 21, 1993 | 3738–3770 S. Flower St. 34°00′58″N 118°16′54″W | Exposition Park | Built between 1937 and 1941, named "Sable Arms Apartments", designed by architect W.L. Schmolle in Mediterranean Style |
| 591 | Denker Estate | | March 8, 1994 | 3820 W. Adams Blvd. 34°01′56″N 118°19′38″W | West Adams - Jefferson Park | Two-story Beaux Arts style 1912 building designed by architect B. Cooper Corbett for Louise Denker, widow of hotel and real estate tycoon Andrew Denker. |
| 598 | Benjamin J. Waters Residence | | September 27, 1994 | 2289 W. 25th St. 34°02′02″N 118°19′02″W | Arlington Heights | Victorian Colonial Revival style house built in 1899 |
| 599 | Julius Bierlich Residence | | September 27, 1994 | 1818 S. Gramercy Pl. 34°02′28″N 118°18′45″W | West Adams - Harvard Heights | 2-story California Craftsman bungalow was designed by architect Frank M. Tyler in 1914. |
| 600 | Lucien and Blanche Gray Residence | | September 27, 1994 | 2515–2519 4th Ave. | West Adams | |
| 601 | Gramercy Park Homestead | | September 27, 1994 | 2098–2108 W. 24th St. 34°02′04″N 118°18′43″W | Jefferson Park | |
| 602 | Auguste R. Marquis Residence (Filipino Federation of America) | | September 27, 1994 | 2300–2312 W. 25th St. 34°02′00″N 118°19′04″W | West Adams - West Adams Terrace | |
| 606 | Kerckhoff House | | November 1, 1994 | 730–746 W. Adams Blvd. 34°01′45″N 118°16′45″W | West Adams - St. James Park | |
| 607 | Powers Apartment#1 | | November 1, 1994 | 2325–2329 Scarff St. 34°01′57″N 118°16′50″W | West Adams | |
| 608 | Powers Apartment#2 | | November 1, 1994 | 2326–2332 Scarff St. 34°01′56″N 118°16′48″W | West Adams - St. James Park | |
| 609 | Powers Apartment#3 | | November 1, 1994 | 2308–2312 1/2 Scarff St. 34°01′58″N 118°16′47″W | West Adams - St. James Park | |
| 610 | Shankland House | | November 1, 1994 | 715 W. 28th St. 34°01′38″N 118°16′48″W | West Adams | |
| 620 | Leimert Plaza | | February 2, 1996 | 4395 Leimert Blvd. 34°00′08″N 118°19′51″W | Leimert Park | |
| 621 | Alice Lynch Residence | | March 6, 1996 | 2414 4th Ave. 34°02′05″N 118°19′15″W | West Adams - West Adams Terrace | |
| 625 | Thomas Butler Henry Residence | | June 21, 1996 | 1400 S. Manhattan Pl. 34°02′46″N 118°18′35″W | West Adams - Harvard Heights | |
| 626 | Eyraud Residence | | June 21, 1996 | 1326 S. Manhattan Pl. 34°02′47″N 118°18′35″W | Arlington Heights | |
| 627 | John F. Powers Residence | | June 21, 1996 | 1547 S. Manhattan Pl. 34°02′38″N 118°18′37″W | West Adams - Harvard Heights | |
| 654 | Craftsman Mansion | | September 18, 1998 | 4318 Victoria Park Pl. 34°02′45″N 118°19′47″W | West Adams - Victoria Park | |
| 658 | Harry & Grace Wurtzel House | | November 4, 1998 | 926 Longwood Ave. | Mid-Wilshire | |
| 662 | Perrine House | | June 22, 1999 | 2229 S. Gramercy Pl. 34°02′10″N 118°18′49″W | West Adams - West Adams Terrace | |
| 672 | Percy H. Clark Residence | | November 9, 1999 | 2639 S. Van Buren Pl. 34°01′53″N 118°17′50″W | West Adams | |
| 678 | The Furlong House | | April 25, 2000 | 2657 S. Van Buren Pl. 34°01′51″N 118°17′50″W | West Adams | |
| 679 | Maverick's Flat | | April 25, 2000 | 4225–4225 1/2 S. Crenshaw Blvd. | Leimert Park | |
| 688 | Holiday Bowl | | December 19, 2000 | 3730 S. Crenshaw Blvd. 34°01′09″N 118°20′05″W | Crenshaw | Founded in 1958 by five Japanese-Americans to rebuild the Nikkei community after World War II internment; torn down in October 2003. |
| 705 | Dryden Residence | | December 18, 2001 | 3825 W. Adams Blvd. 34°01′58″N 118°19′37″W | West Adams - West Adams Terrace | |
| 725 | John G. Jones Lodge | | October 1, 2002 | 5900 S. Broadway; 33°59′11″N 118°16′40″W | South Los Angeles | |
| 726 | Gilbert W. Lindsay Home | | October 1, 2002 | 774 E. 52nd Pl. 33°59′41″N 118°15′40″W | South Los Angeles | |
| 744 | Lincoln Theatre | | March 18, 2003 | 2300 S. Central Ave. 34°01′13″N 118°15′13″W | South Los Angeles | |
| 754 | First Presbyterian Church of Los Angeles | | June 3, 2003 | 1809 West Blvd. 34°02′26″N 118°20′14″W | Mid-City | |
| 757 | Joseph Dupy Residence-South Seas Edwardian | | July 29, 2003 | 2301 W. 24th St. 34°02′05″N 118°19′03″W | West Adams - West Adams Terrace | |
| 761 | Kissam House | | July 29, 2003 | 2160 W. 20th St. 34°02′18″N 118°18′39″W | Arlington Heights | |
| 764 | Lady Effie's Tea Parlor | | October 1, 2003 | 453 E. Adams Blvd. 34°01′22″N 118°15′49″W | South Los Angeles | |
| 774 | Angelus Funeral Home | | January 6, 2004 | 1028-1030 E. Jefferson Blvd. 34°00′42″N 118°15′25″W | South Los Angeles | |
| 776 | Ray Charles Worldwide Offices and Studios | | January 21, 2004 | 2107 W. Washington Blvd. 34°02′25″N 118°18′22″W | West Adams - Harvard Heights | The corner of Westmoreland and Washington Boulevards is known as "Ray Charles Square" |
| 779 | Michael J. Connell Carriage House | | May 19, 2004 | 634 W. 23rd St. 34°01′51″N 118°16′31″W | West Adams | |
| 780 | Bernays House | | May 7, 2004 | 1656 W. 25th St. 34°02′00″N 118°17′57″W | West Adams | |
| 787 | Fire Station 21 | | August 10, 2004 | 1187 E. 52nd St. 33°59′45″N 118°15′15″W | South Los Angeles | |
| 791 | Betty Hill House | | April 13, 2005 | 1655 W. 37th Pl. 34°01′12″N 118°18′28″W | Jefferson Park | Home of early 20th century African American activist Betty Hill (c. 1882–1960). |
| 798 | Mary E. Smith House | | May 18, 2005 | 1186 W. 27th St. 34°01′48″N 118°17′10″W | West Adams | |
| 811 | Tate-McCoy Homestead | | July 8, 2005 | 1463–1469 S. Norton Ave. 34°02′40″N 118°19′30″W | Arlington Heights | |
| 818 | J.R. Dennison House | | July 13, 2005 | 1919 S. Harvard Blvd. 34°02′22″N 118°18′16″W | West Adams - West Adams Heights | |
| 819 | Vista Magnolia Court | | July 13, 2005 | 1201-1215 W. 27th St., 2671 S. Magnolia Ave. | West Adams | |
| 820 | Williard J. Doran Residence | | July 13, 2005 | 1194 W. 27th St. 34°01′48″N 118°17′11″W | West Adams | |
| 851 | 28th Street YMCA | | September 27, 2006 | 1006 E. 28th St. 34°01′01″N 118°15′26″W | South Los Angeles | |
| 854 | Cline Residence and Museum | | October 11, 2006 | 1401-1409 S. Gramercy Pl. 34°02′45″N 118°18′48″W | West Adams - Harvard Heights | |
| 855 | Statton Residence | | October 11, 2006 | 1415 S. Gramercy Pl. 34°02′44″N 118°18′48″W | Arlington Heights | |
| 864 | Life Magazine/Leimert Park House | | March 27, 2007 | 3892 S. Olmstead Ave. | Leimert Park | |
| 865 | Joseph L. Starr Farmhouse | | April 11, 2007 | 2801 S. Arlington Ave. | West Adams - Jefferson Park | |
| 866 | Glen Lukens Home and Studio | | April 11, 2007 | 3425 W. 27th St. 34°01′51″N 118°19′19″W | West Adams - Jefferson Park | |
| 879 | Louise Pratt House | | July 17, 2007 | 2706 S. Menlo St. 34°01′48″N 118°17′24″W | West Adams - North University Park - Menlo Avenue–West Twenty-ninth Street Historic District | |
| 880 | Bigelow-Wood Residence | | July 17, 2007 | 2905 S. Hoover St. 34°01′40″N 118°17′03″W | West Adams | |
| 884 | Waters-Shaw Family Residence | | August 15, 2007 | 2700 S. Severance St. 34°01′44″N 118°16′53″W | West Adams | |
| 885 | Holmes-Shannon House | | August 15, 2007 | 4311 Victoria Park Dr. 34°02′47″N 118°19′45″W | West Adams - Victoria Park | |
| 924 | Bigford Residence | | July 2, 2008 | 1546 S. Fifth Ave. | Arlington Heights | |
| 968 | Bethlehem Baptist Church | | December 15, 2009 | 4901 Compton Ave. 33°59′53.79″N 118°14′53.25″W | South Los Angeles | Built 1944, only realized church by R. M. Schindler, has de Stijl style layers. "Rare example of Modernist architecture that crossed L.A.'s economic and racial boundaries." |
| 987 | St. Philip the Evangelist Church | | 2010 | 2716 S. Stanford Avenue | South Los Angeles | Spanish Colonial Revival/Romanesque style; brightly colored stained glass windows and an original 1928 Skinner Opus 737 organ. Architects: Williams, Garrott & Young. |
| 988 | St. Philip the Evangelist Parish Hall | | 2010 | 2716 S. Stanford Avenue | South Los Angeles | many prominent African-Americans were church members |
| 990 | Hauerwaas Kusayanagi Residence | | October 27, 2010 | 3741 W 27th Street | Jefferson Park | approved by city council action |
| 1000 | Golden State Mutual Life Insurance Building (1949) | | June 1, 2011 | 1999 W. Adams Blvd. | West Adams | Architect Paul R. Williams designed this six-story Late Moderne style commercial building in 1949, to house the Golden State Mutual Life Insurance Company. |
| 1073 | Charles C. Hurd Residence | | August 12, 2014 | 4359 Victoria Park Place | West Adams - Victoria Park | Built in 1909, the Charles C. Hurd Residence is a single-family home built in the Arts & Crafts Tudor Revival Style |
| 1253 | Paul Revere Williams House | | February 16, 2022 | 1271 W. 35th Street | Jefferson Park | Williams bought the home in 1921 and used it as his principal residence until he moved to Lafayette Park in 1952 |

== Non-HCM sites also recognized ==
The Historic-Cultural Monuments listed above include many of the most important historic sites in South Los Angeles. In addition, the Los Angeles Memorial Coliseum is a U.S. National Historic Landmark in the region. Some other sites and historic districts within the South Los Angeles region have been listed on the National Register of Historic Places or designated as California Historical Landmarks, but were not also listed as HCMs. These are:

| Code | Landmark namevanbure | Image | Selected date | Locality | Neighborhood | Description |
|---|---|---|---|---|---|---|
| (1010) (2348) | Los Angeles Memorial Coliseum Exposition Park | | | 3911 S. Figueroa St. 34°00′50″N 118°17′16″W | Exposition Park | |
| (1029) | Vermont Avenue Presbyterian Church | | | 5300-5308 S. Vermont Ave. 33°59′38″N 118°17′28″W | South Los Angeles | |
| (1032) (2712) | McCarty Memorial Christian Church | | 2002-01-17 | 4101 W. Adams Blvd. 34°01′58″N 118°19′47″W | West Adams | Gothic Revival church of the Christian Church (Disciples of Christ); founded in 1932 as a white congregation; integrated and became a multi-racial congregation in the mid-1950s |
| (2192) | Natural History Museum of Los Angeles County | | | 900 Exposition Blvd. | Exposition Park | Opened in 1913; fitted marble walls and domed and colonnaded rotunda; often used as filming location |
| (2300) | St. James Park Historic District | | | Roughly bounded by 21st and 23 Sts., Mount St. Mary's College, W. Adams Blvd. and Union Ave. 34°01′53″N 118°16′48″W | West Adams | |
| (2301) | Twentieth Street Historic District | | | 912-950 W. 20th St. 34°02′09″N 118°16′47″W | West Adams - North University Park | |
| (2304) | Van Buren Place Historic District | | | 2620-2657 Van Buren Pl. (both sides of street); 34°01′55″N 118°17′50″W | West Adams - Adams-Normandie HPOZ | Craftsman style homes built from 1903 to 1916 in 2600 block of Van Buren Place |
| (2307) | Exposition Park Rose Garden | | | 900 Exposition Blvd. | Exposition Park | Sunken rose garden created in the 1920s, featuring more than 20,000 rose bushes and 200 varieties of roses |
| (2311) | Menlo Avenue-West Twenty-ninth Street Historic District | | | Bounded by Adams Blvd., Ellendale Pl., Thirtieth St., and Vermont Ave. | West Adams - North University Park | |
| (2506) | Moneta Branch Library | | | 4255 S. Olive St. 34°00′20″N 118°16′46″W | South Los Angeles | |
| | Angelus Mesa Branch Library | | 1987-05-19 | 2700 W. 52nd St. 33°59′41″N 118°19′20″W | Angeles Mesa | Branch library; built in 1929 |
| | Jefferson Branch | | 1987-05-19 | 2211 W. Jefferson Blvd. 34°1′20″N 118°18′59″W | Jefferson Park | Former branch library; built in 1923 |
| | Helen Hunt Jackson Branch | | 1987-05-19 | 2330 Naomi St. 34°01′07″N 118°15′05″W | South Los Angeles | Former branch library; built in 1926; currently a church |
| | North University Park Historic District | | 2004-02-11 | Roughly bounded by Hoover St., Adams Blvd, 28th St. and Magnolia Ave. | West Adams - North University Park | Historic district with many Victorian homes, also the birthplace of Adlai Stevenson II |

== See also ==
- Bibliography of Los Angeles
- Outline of the history of Los Angeles
- Bibliography of California history

=== Lists of L.A. Historic-Cultural Monuments ===
- Historic-Cultural Monuments in Downtown Los Angeles
- Historic-Cultural Monuments on the East and Northeast Sides
- Historic-Cultural Monuments in the Harbor area
- Historic-Cultural Monuments in Hollywood
- Historic-Cultural Monuments in the San Fernando Valley
- Historic-Cultural Monuments in Silver Lake, Angelino Heights, and Echo Park
- Historic-Cultural Monuments on the Westside
- Historic-Cultural Monuments in the Wilshire and Westlake areas

=== Other ===
- City of Los Angeles' Historic Preservation Overlay Zones
- National Register of Historic Places listings in Los Angeles
- National Register of Historic Places listings in Los Angeles County
- List of California Historical Landmarks
