= St. James Park, Los Angeles =

Historic district in California, United States

- St. James Park Historic District
- U.S. National Register of Historic Places
- U.S. Historic district
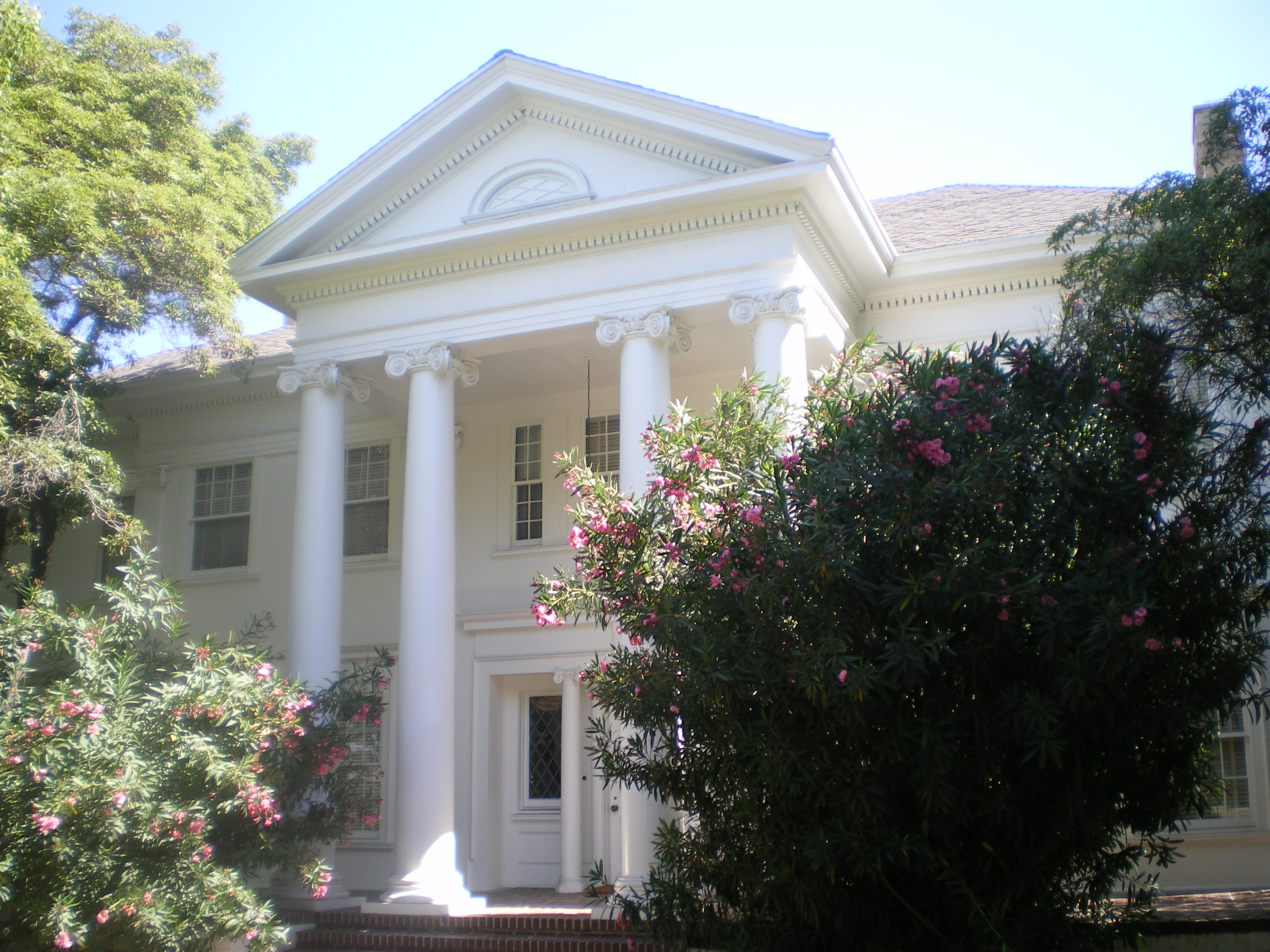
- House at 27 St. James Park

- Location within Los Angeles
- Location: West Adams, Los Angeles
- Coordinates: 34°2′0″N 118°16′48″W
- Architect: Multiple
- Architectural style: Classical Revival, Bungalow/Craftsman, Queen Anne
- NRHP reference No.: 91001387
- Added to NRHP: September 27, 1991

St. James Park is a neighborhood in the West Adams section of Los Angeles, California. It is a residential neighborhood surrounding St. James Park consisting of homes built in a mix of Classical Revival, Craftsman and Queen Anne styles. The neighborhood was added to the National Register of Historic Places in 1991 and contains eleven Historic-Cultural Monuments.

== History ==
In 1887, the Los Angeles Herald announced that the forthcoming St. James Park would have a stone entrance to "rival the Arc de Triomphe" and would be eventually be surrounded by "the most costly residences yet erected on this coast". Named by George King and his wife, the couple donated the parkland to the city in commemoration of their many trips to London.

As the neighborhood around the park developed, prominent residents included Leslie Keeley, Homer Laughlin, Eli P. Clark, Margaret Hughes, Thomas Dockweiler and Norman Sterry.

In 1896, the Ladies Auxiliary had a benefit for the Stimson-Lafayette Industrial School. The event had a carnival theme, with "myriads of electric lights", palmists, fortune tellers and people in costume. The Los Angeles Lighting Company furnished the electricity as its contribution to the event. There were multiple themed booths, including an American Booth, a Spanish Booth, and two Central American booths. At 11 PM, "the tamale booth, which was one of the most beautiful in the grounds", caught fire from a Japanese lantern. Hours later, the phonograph booth caught fire in the same way and was destroyed.

In September 1906, a Los Angeles Times reporter wrote: "The growing popularity of apartment houses is causing them to encroach on grounds heretofore exclusively reserved for high-class residences". He was reporting on "one of the handsomest apartment-houses in the city", which was designed by Thornton Fitzhue and was to be built on the southern side of St. James Park, "with a north frontage on the botanical gardens". All would have servants' quarters. Landowner John R. Powers completed another apartment building in St. James Place in 1909, with an entrance also on Scarff Street. Designed by George W. Wryman, it was divided into four apartments of seven rooms each; the venture represented an investment of $35,000.

In 1909 the sidewalks of St. James Park were known as a place where nurses attending perambulators would air and care for babies of the mothers who lived nearby.

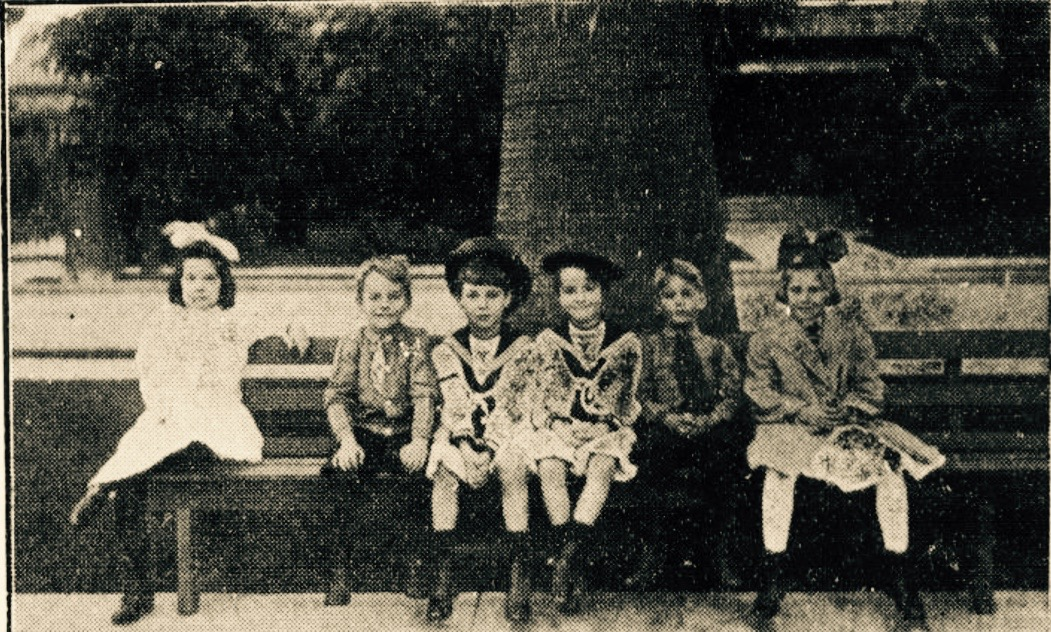
Children on a bench in St. James Park, 1909.

In the 1910s, '20s, '30s and '40s, the Times and the Los Angeles Evening Express continued to cover the "high society" families living in St. James Park.

In 1937, the Times said: "St James Place, Chester Place, Scarff Street - those place-names mean little to present day Angelinos. Yet they spell an aristocratic Los Angeles of the past, and to a good extent, the present. They are of the wealthy Los Angeles of a past generation, and a visitor to the neighborhood will find evidence of its elegance, if somewhat frayed and faded in spots."

Five years later, in 1942, the Times stated that many of the neighborhood's well known residents had moved elsewhere. In reporting on the neighborhood 50 years after its origin, the Times stated: "Although the time had passed, perhaps forever, when gold-leaf painted ceilings, brocade or tapestry walls shall be in vogue, the exquisite colors and quality of those imported materials will live as long as the memory of the vanishing Old World."

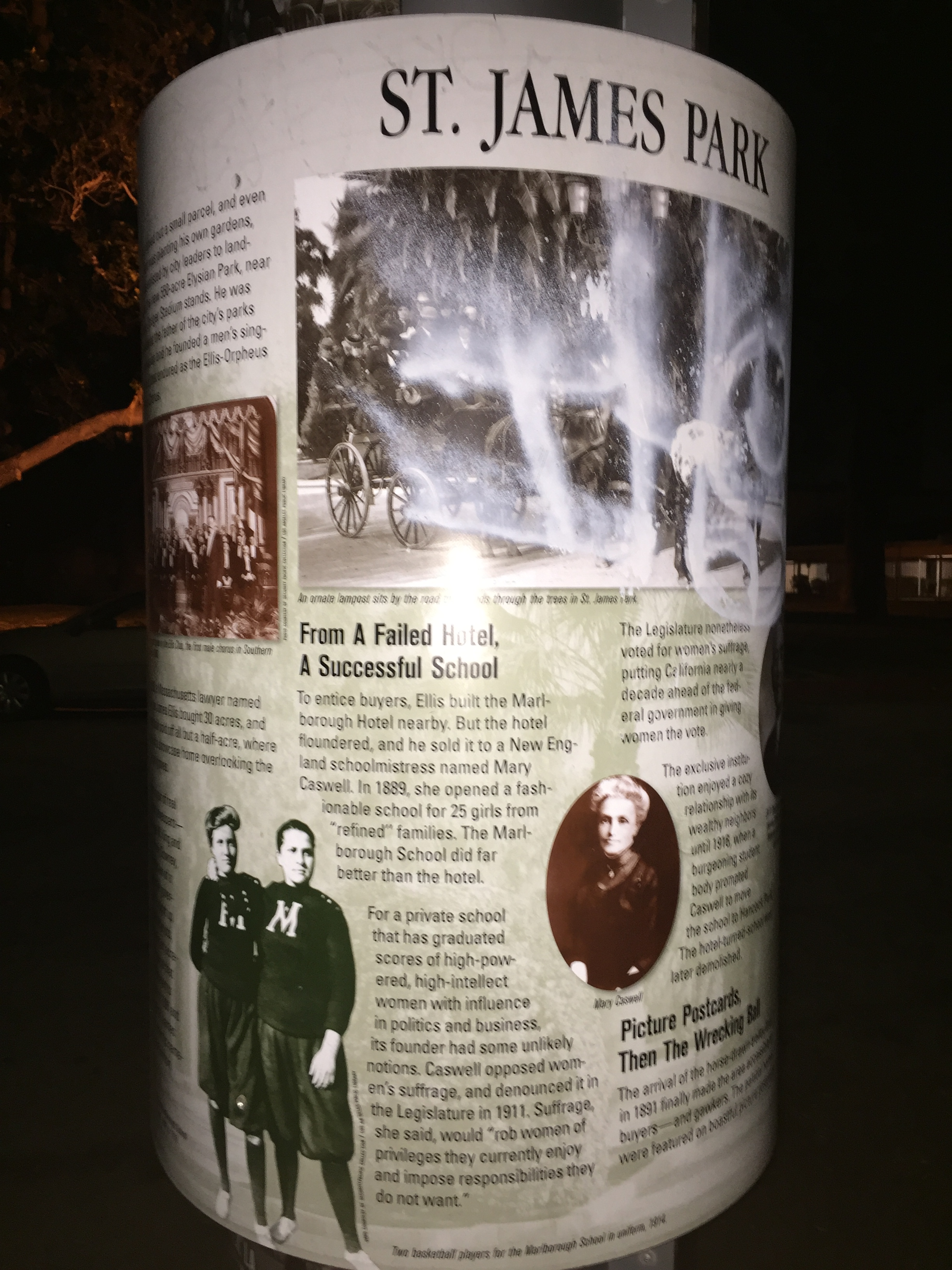
History panel installed in the St. James Park neighborhood.

The Times would not mention St. James Park again for forty years; In 1984, it reported on a tour of early city homes for "First Century Families" and their descendants.

On September 27, 1991, the neighborhood of St. James Park was added to the National Register of Historic Places.

In 1992, a developer "mis-led" the city in order to get a demolition permit for 2377 Scarff Street in St. James Park. The developer, who wanted to build condominiums, 'mis-led" the city by saying the property was damaged during the riots, therefore receiving a demolition permit under a streamlined process designed to hasten rebuilding. Despite being a contributing structure to the St. James Historic District, and having a historic marker on the property itself, the developer was allowed to begin demolishing the home without notifying the surrounding community. The city publicly acknowledged the mistake.

== Geography ==
The St. James Park Historic District is roughly bounded by 21st and 23 Streets., Mount St. Mary's College, West Adams Boulevard and Union Avenue.

== Historic-Cultural Monuments ==
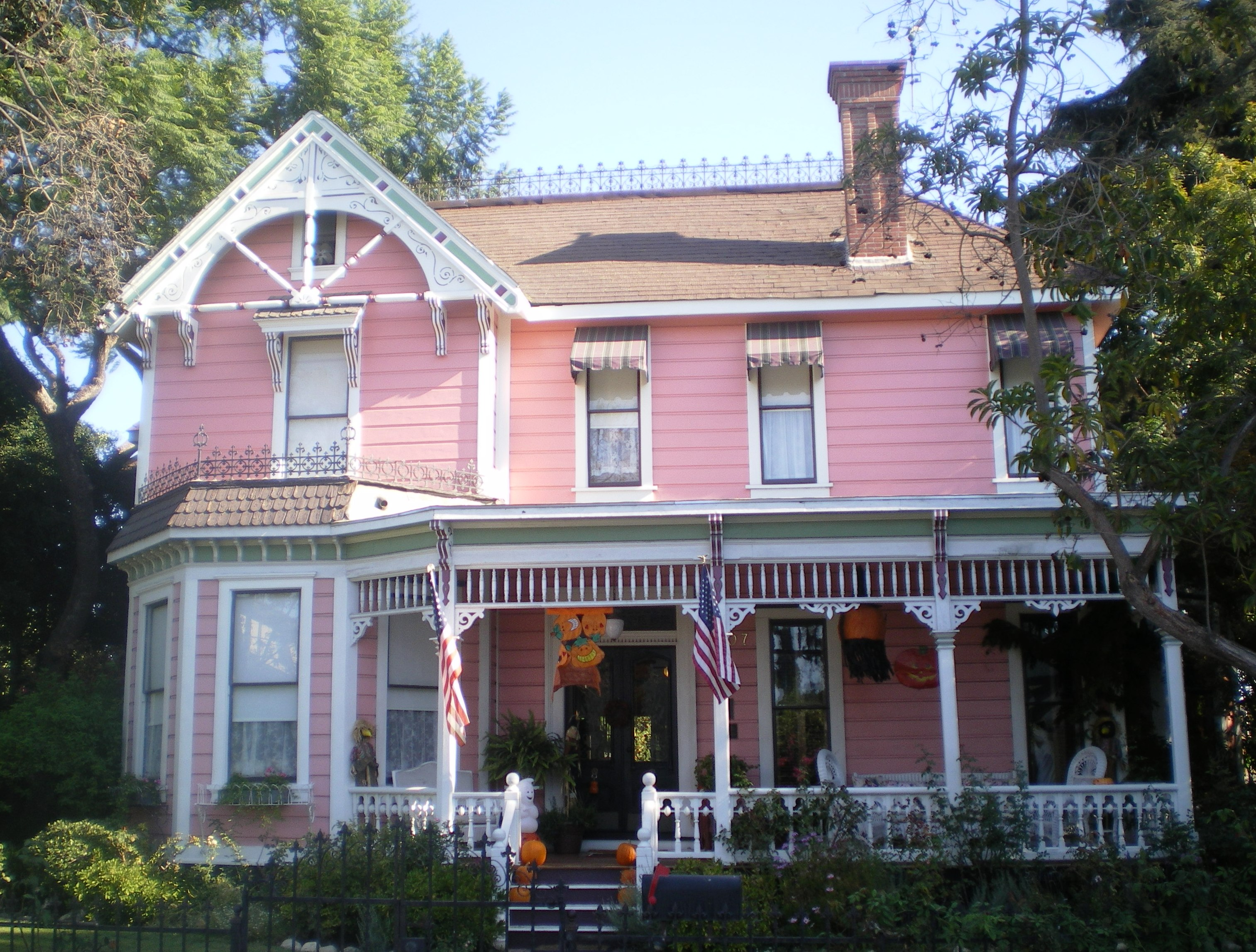
Durfee House, 2008

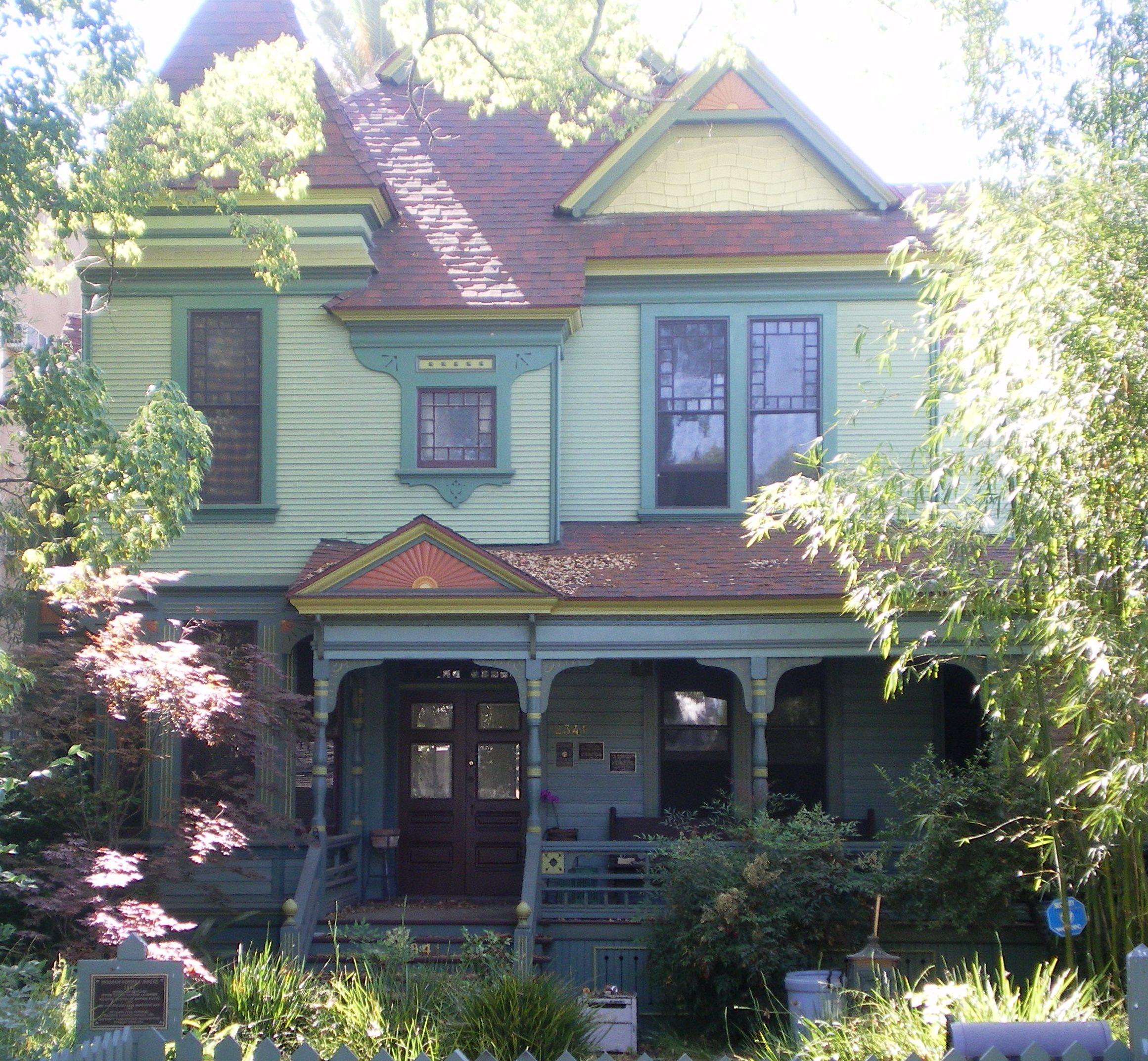
Seaman-Foshay House, 2008

When the neighborhood of St. James Park was added to the National Register of Historic Places, it was noted that the following Historic-Cultural Monuments were in the community:

(listed in order of HCM number)

- Durfee Residence, 1007 W. 24th Street - Historic-Cultural Monument #273 (also listed on the National register)
- Henry J. Reuman Residence, 925 W. 23rd Street - Historic-Cultural Monument #335
- Seyler House, 2305 Scarff Street- Historic-Cultural Monument #407
- Seaman-Foshay House, 2341 Scarff Street - Historic-Cultural Monument #408 (also listed on the National Register)
- Burkhalter House, 2309 Scarff Street- Historic-Cultural Monument #409
- Distributing Station No. 31, 1035 W. 24th Street- Historic-Cultural Monument #410
- Stearns-Dockweiler Residence, 27 St. James Park - Historic-Cultural Monument #434
- Margaret T. and Bettie Mead Creighton Residence, 2342 Scarff Street - Historic-Cultural Monument #455
- Freeman G. Teed House, 2365 Scarff Street - Historic-Cultural Monument #457
- Henry J. Foster Residence, 1030 W. 23rd Street - Historic-Cultural Monument #466
- Chalet Apartments, 2375 Scarff Street - Historic-Cultural Monument #467

== See also ==
- List of Registered Historic Places in Los Angeles
- West Adams, Los Angeles
