= Exposition Park, Los Angeles =

Neighborhood in California, US

Coordinates: 34.01467°N 118.28509°W

Exposition Park
- Neighborhood of Los Angeles
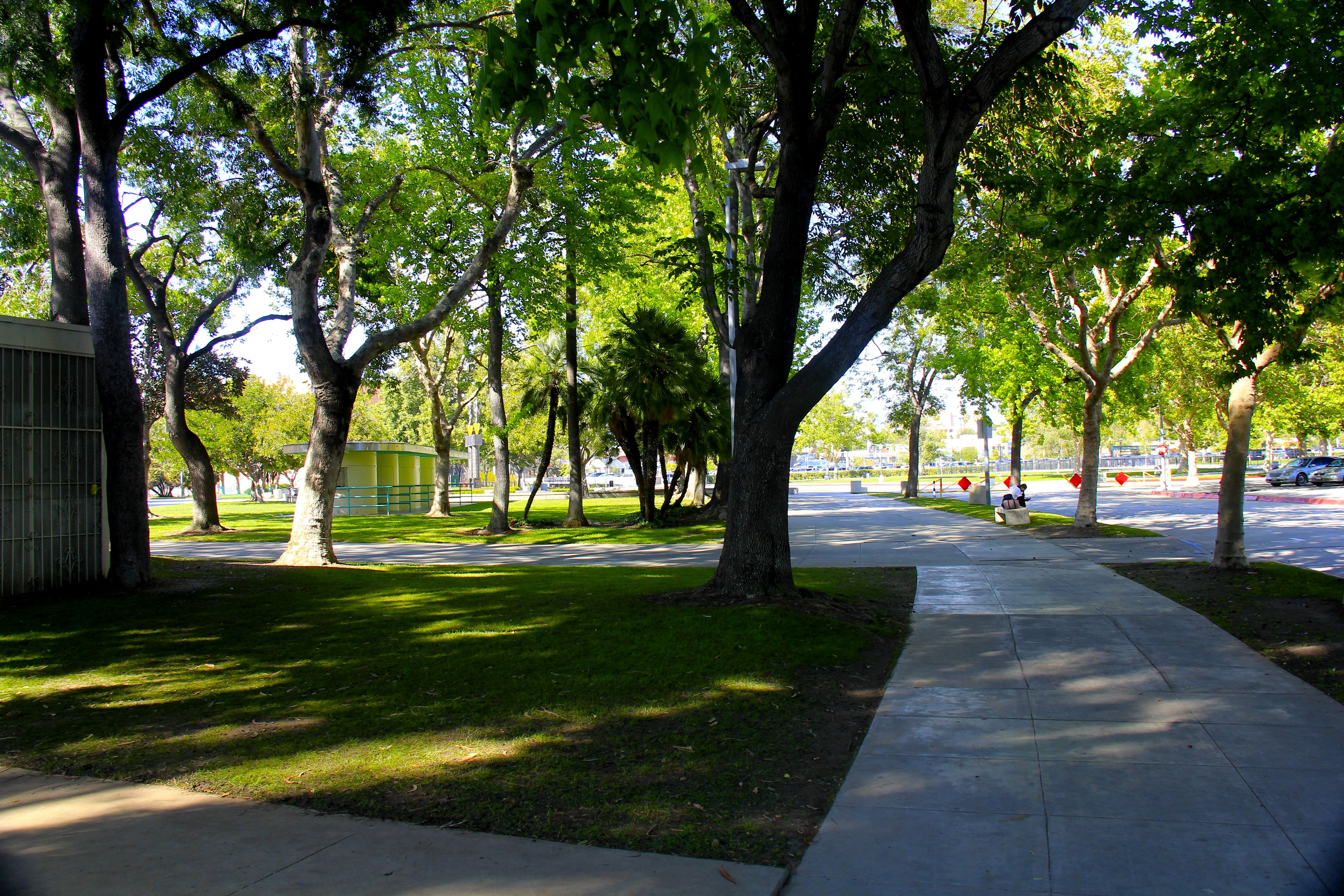
- Los Angeles Memorial Coliseum tree-lined entrance

- Location in Central Los Angeles
- Country: United States
- State: California
- County: Los Angeles
- City: Los Angeles
- Time zone: Pacific
- Area code: 323

Exposition Park is a neighborhood in the south region of Los Angeles, California. It is home to Exposition Park, which includes the Los Angeles Memorial Coliseum, BMO Stadium, the Exposition Rose Garden and three museums: the California African American Museum, the California Science Center and the Natural History Museum of Los Angeles County. It is also home to a Science Center Academy.

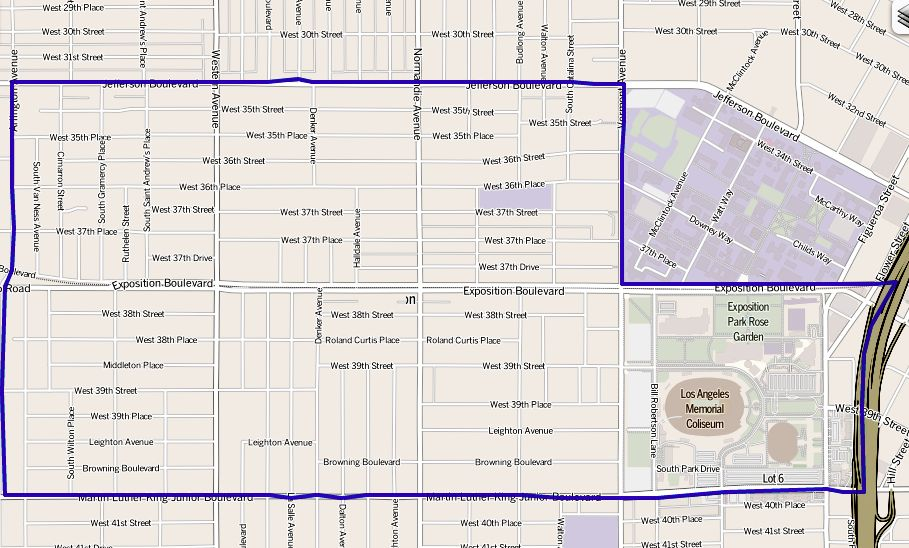
Exposition Park neighborhood boundaries of the city of Los Angeles, as mapped by the Los Angeles Times

== Geography ==
According to the Mapping L.A. project of the Los Angeles Times, The Exposition Park 1.85-square-mile neighborhood is flanked by Adams-Normandie on the north, University Park on the northeast, Historic South Central on the east, Vermont Square on the south, and Jefferson Park and Leimert Park on the west. It is bounded by Jefferson Boulevard on the north, Vermont Avenue on the east, Martin Luther King Jr. Boulevard on the south and Arlington Avenue on the west, to which is added all of Exposition Park and additional land along both sides of Figueroa Street east and Exit 20A of the Interstate 110 Freeway.

== Population ==
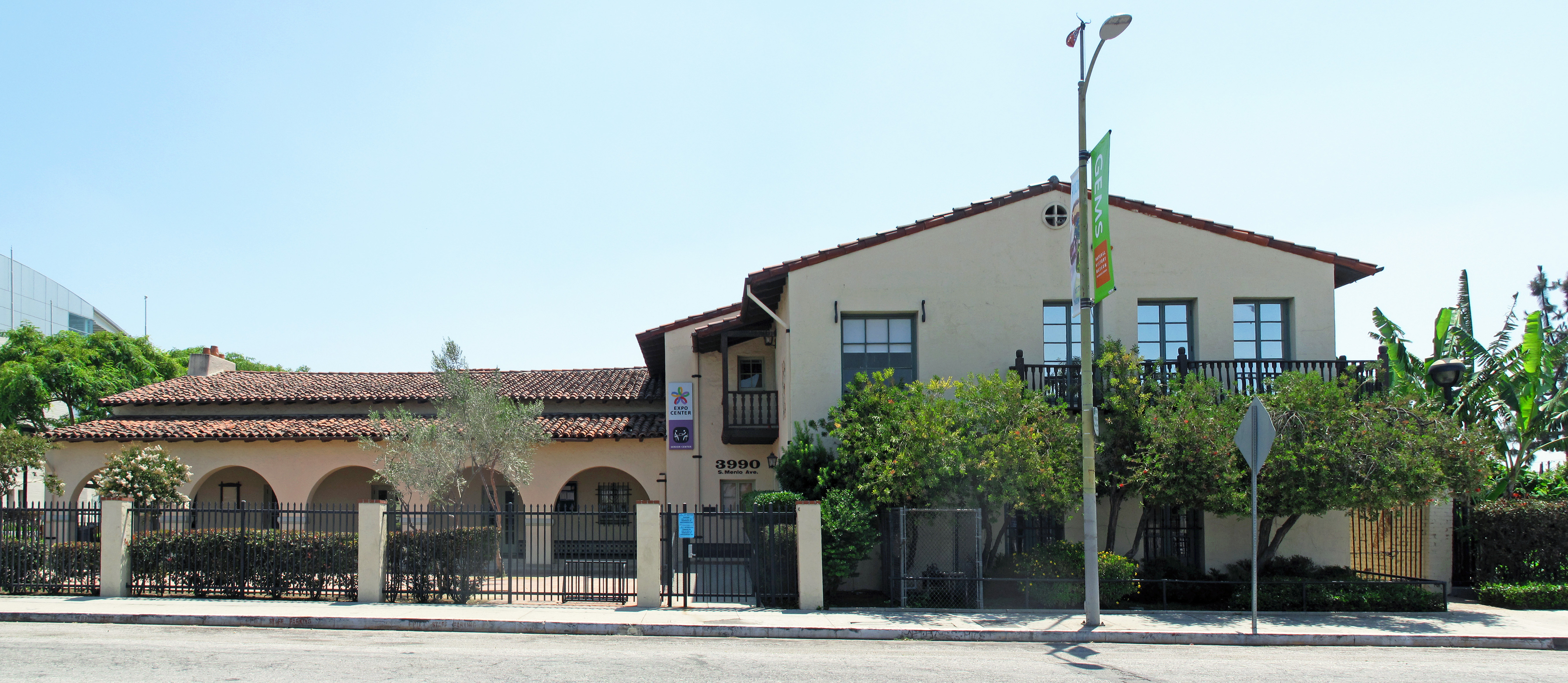
The historic Mission Revival style Exposition Club House, a Los Angeles Historic-Cultural Monument.

A total of 31,062 residents counted in its 1.85 square miles, which is including the park land as well as Los Angeles Memorial Coliseum according to the 2000 U.S. census—an average of 16,819 people per square mile among the highest population densities for both the city and the county. By 2008 the population had increased to 33,458, the city has estimated.

The median age was 26, considered young for both the city and the county, and the percentages of residents aged birth through 18 were among the county's highest. There were 1,818 families headed by single parents; the rate of 27.3% was considered high for both the city and the county.

Within the neighborhood, Latinos made up 56.1% of the population, while African American were at 38.1%— both considered high percentages for the county. Other ethnicities were White, 2.2%; Asian, 1.6%; and other, 2%. Mexico and El Salvador were the most common places of birth for the 38.5% of the residents who were born abroad, an average percentage of foreign-born when compared with the city as a whole.

The median household income in 2008 dollars was $33,999, considered low for both the city and county. The percentage of households earning $20,000 or less was high, compared to the county at large. The average household size of 3.3 people was about the same as in the city at large. Renters occupied 69% of the housing units, and homeowners occupied the rest. The percentages of never-married people were among the county's highest—45.5% for men and 39.1% for women.

== Education ==
Only 7.3% of the neighborhood residents aged 25 and older had a four-year degree, a low percentage for both the city and the county. The percentage of residents of that age with less than a high school diploma was also high (the total number being 8,603, compared with 8,213 with more education).

The schools operating with the Exposition Park neighborhood boundaries are:

- Alliance College-Ready Academy High No. 5 (LAUSD, charter), 1729 West Martin Luther King Jr. Boulevard
- Foshay Learning Center (LAUSD, K-12), 3751 South Harvard Boulevard
- Thurgood Marshall Charter Middle School (LAUSD), 3200 West Adams Boulevard
- Lenicia B. Weemes Elementary School (LAUSD), 1260 West 36th Place
- Dr. Theo T. Alexander Jr. Science Center (LAUSD, charter elementary), 3737 S. Figueroa Street, within Exposition Park, the school first opened on September 9, 2004
- Martin Luther King Jr. Elementary School, (LAUSD), 3989 South Hobart Street

== Special Events ==
On September 19th, 2026, the Lucas Museum of Narrative Art hosted its opening night gala in Los Angeles, California. Mellody Hobson, alongside George Lucas, fellow artists, film figures, and public officials hosted a private opening-night celebration. The event was held at the Exposition Park, with public speeches on the occasion of the grand opening and general project details. The main speakers included Queen Latifah, Mellody Hobson, and George Lucas. Queen Latifah described the event as a celebration of the birth of a new cultural institution to the community. Mellody Hobson and George Lucas both discussed several processes of the making of the museum while guests viewed galleries, attended a rooftop drone show, and a final performance by The Black Eyed Peas.

== Transportation ==
Three Metro E Line stations are located within the Exposition Park neighborhood:

- Expo Park/USC station
- Vermont station
- Western station

== Olympic Games ==
Two Olympic Games were held at various venues within Exposition Park: the 1932 Summer Olympics and the 1984 Summer Olympics. Park venues are also scheduled to host events for the 2028 Summer Olympics and 2028 Summer Paralympics.

== Recreation and parks ==
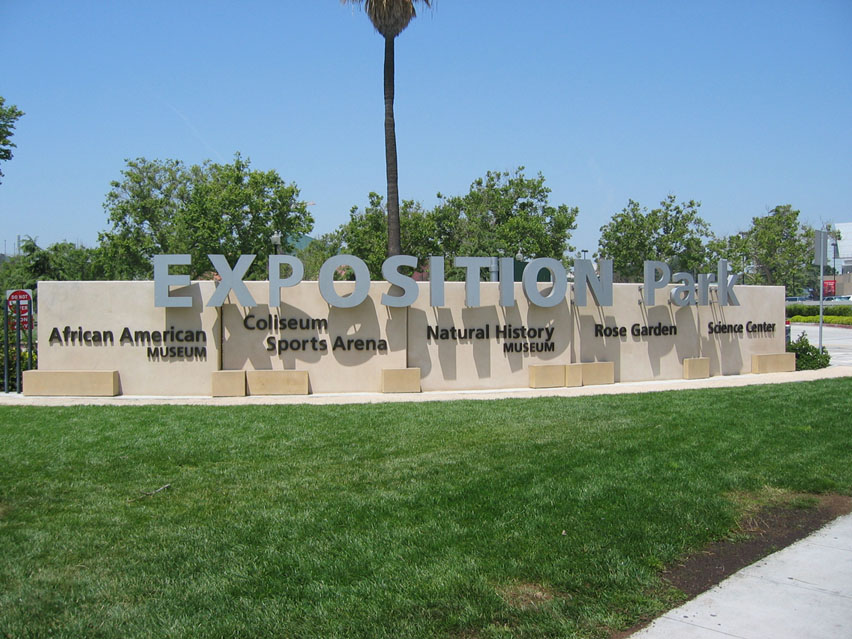
Exposition Park Entrance sign, (2007)

- Exposition Park (Los Angeles)
- Denker Recreation Center, 1550 West 35th Place
- Martin Luther King Jr. Park, 3916 South Western Avenue

== Notable people ==
- Bill Robinson, American tap dancer and actor
- Betty Hill, activist
- Loren Miller, Los Angeles County attorney and judge
- Eric Dolphy, jazz musician
- William J. Powell, aviator
- Reb Spikes, jazz musician
- Ramon Novarro, actor
- Noble Johnson, actor, film producer

== See also ==
- List of districts and neighborhoods in Los Angeles
- List of parks in Los Angeles
