= Exposition Park (urban park) =

Public park in Los Angeles

Coordinates: 34.014659°N 118.287177°W

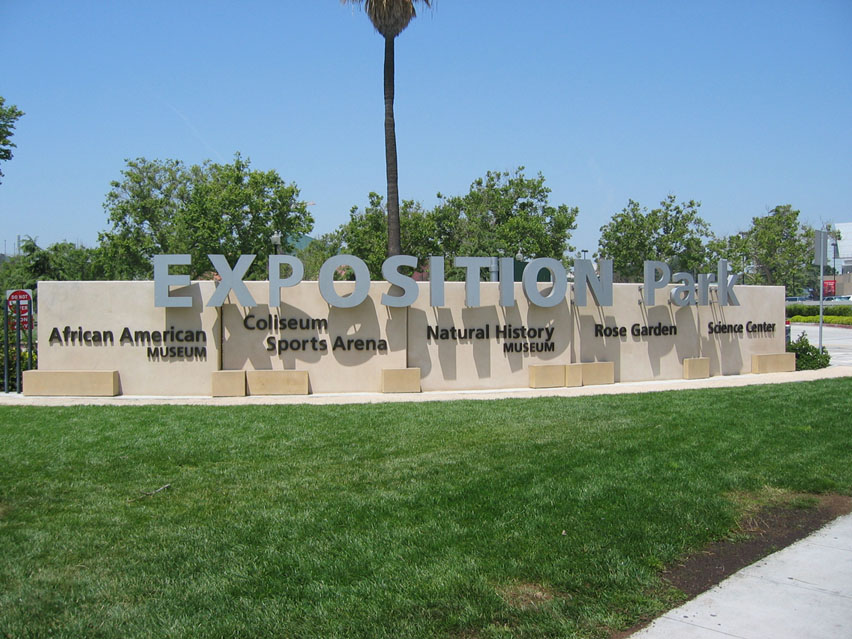
Exposition Park, Los Angeles

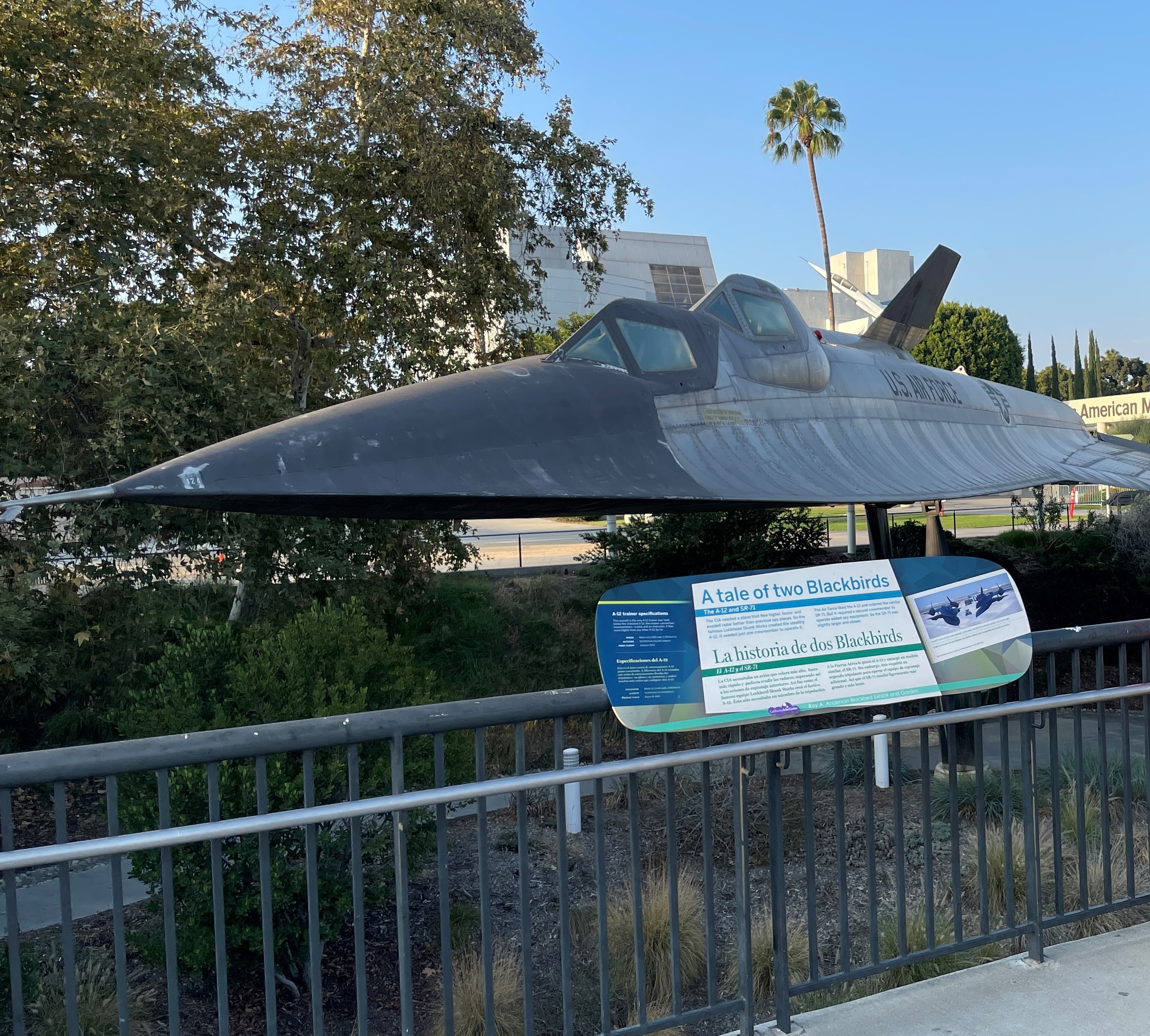
Lockheed A-12 at Exposition Park, 2021

Exposition Park is a 160-acre urban park (65 ha) in the south region of Los Angeles, California, in the Exposition Park neighborhood. Bounded by Exposition Boulevard to the north, South Figueroa Street to the east, Martin Luther King Jr. Boulevard to the south and Vermont Avenue to the west, it is directly south of the main campus of the University of Southern California.

The park was established in 1872 as an agricultural fairground. Exposition Park is now notable for containing several significant museums and sports venues, such as the Los Angeles Memorial Coliseum, BMO Stadium, the California Science Center, the Natural History Museum of Los Angeles County, and the California African American Museum.

The park is a public open space, managed by the Sixth District Agricultural Association. It has served as the Olympic Park on two occasions (1932, 1984) and will again in 2028.

== Features ==
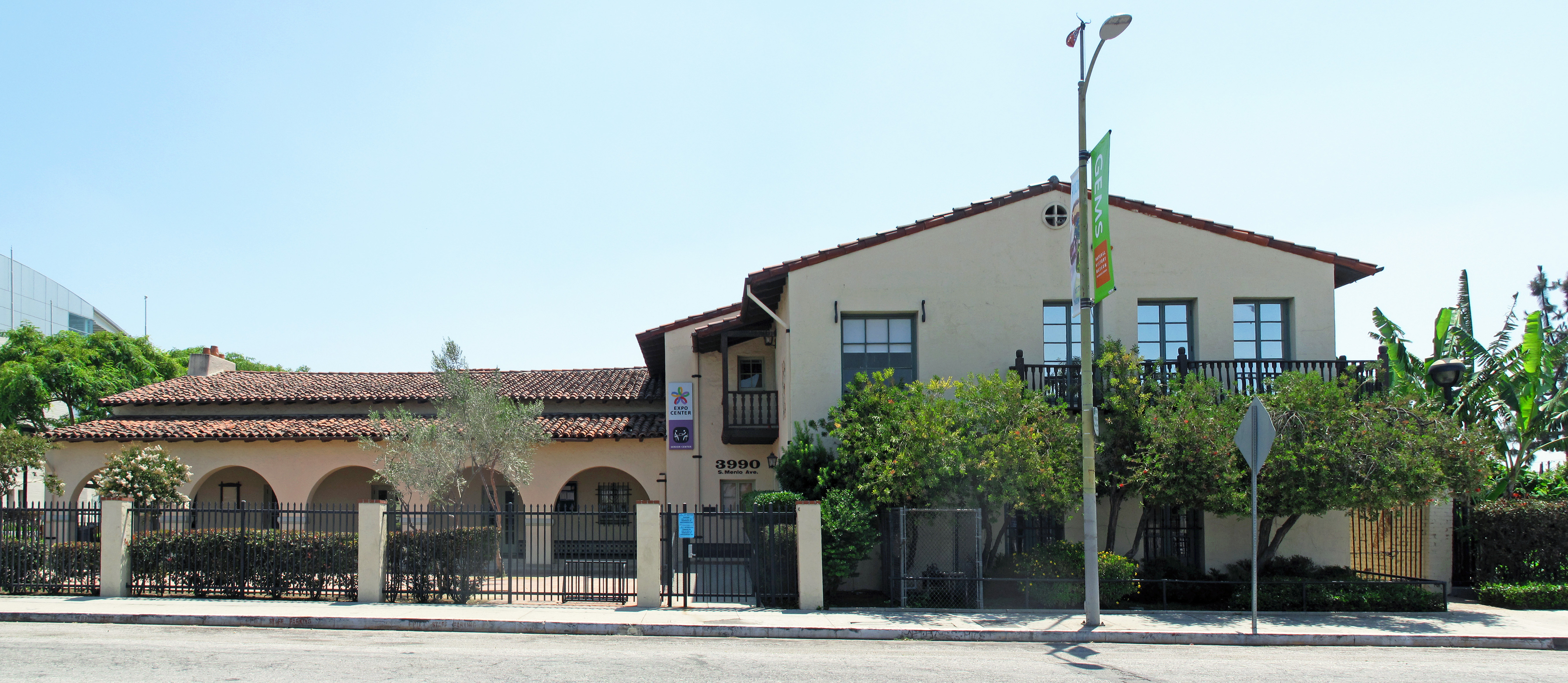
The historic Mission Revival style Exposition Club House, a Los Angeles Historic-Cultural Monument.

Exposition Park houses the following:

- LA84 Foundation/John C. Argue Swim Stadium
- BMO Stadium
  - Home of Los Angeles FC and Angel City FC
- Lucas Museum of Narrative Art
- Los Angeles Memorial Coliseum
  - Home of USC Trojans football
- Natural History Museum of Los Angeles County
- California Science Center
  - IMAX Theater
  - Samuel Oschin Air and Space Center - Home of Space Shuttle Endeavour
- Exposition Park Rose Garden
- California African American Museum
- Wallis Annenberg Building, formerly the Los Angeles Armory
- Concrete hand and footprints signed by Ed Begley Jr. of St. Elsewhere and other actors from medical TV shows such as Ben Casey
- EXPO Center (includes the LA84 Foundation/John C. Argue Swim Stadium) and the Soboroff Sports Field (soccer). Originally managed in 2006 by Bentley Management Group, the Soboroff Sports Field was relocated to the contiguous parcel in 2018 to allow construction of the Lucas Museum of Narrative Art.
- Science Center School and Amgen Center for Science Learning (formerly California National Guard Armory)

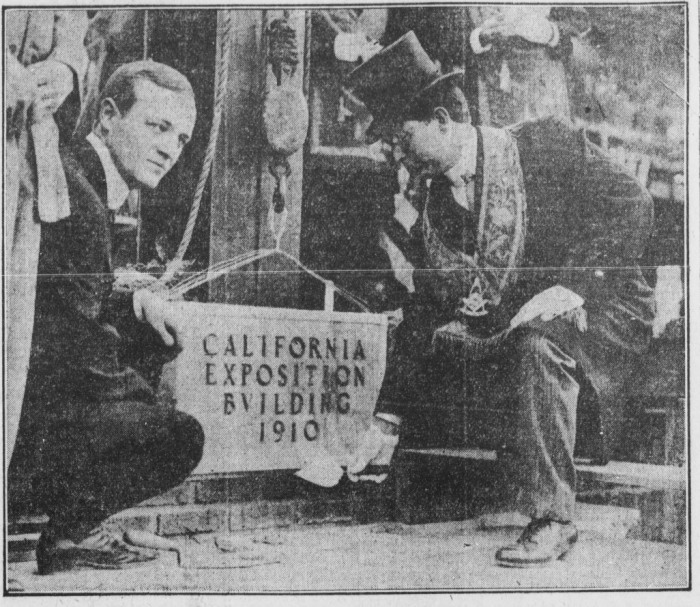
Dana R. Weller and Paul Engstrom laying the cornerstone of the California Exposition Building in 1910 (Los Angeles Herald)

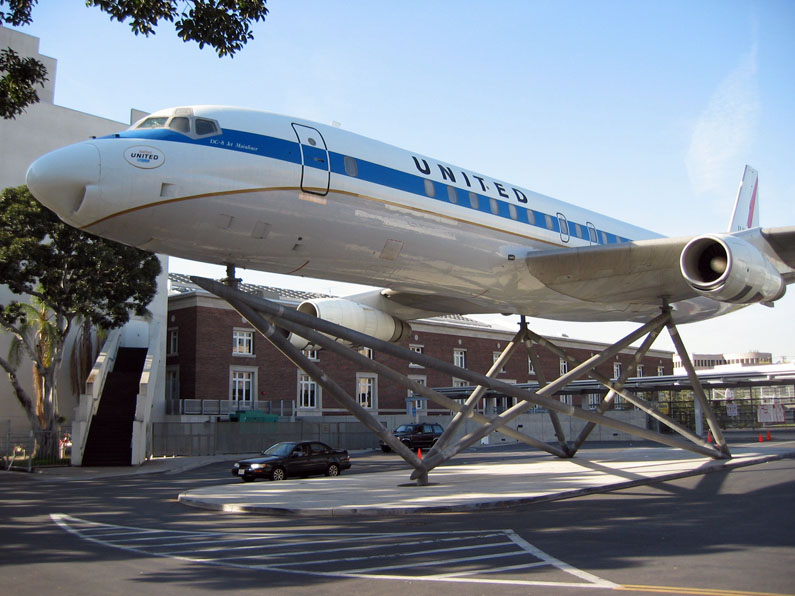
A Douglas DC-8 near the Air and Space Exhibits Gallery

The cultural facilities mentioned above are operated by both the state and Los Angeles County.

=== Former venues ===
- Los Angeles Memorial Sports Arena

== History ==
The 160-acre (0.65 km^{2}) site served as an agricultural fairground from 1872 to 1910 (hence its original name, "Agricultural Park"). In 1880, John Edward, Ozro W. Childs, and former California Governor John G. Downey persuaded the State of California to purchase 160 acres (0.65 km^{2}) in Los Angeles to foster agriculture in the Southland. Farmers sold their harvest and arces on the grounds, while horses, dogs, and even camels competed on a racetrack where a rose garden now sits and blooms. In 1909, a group of civic-minded individuals led by former Pasadena Mayor Horace Dobbins set about reforming the park, removing the racetrack and other activities and replacing them with gardens and museums.

At the 2028 Summer Olympics, the Coliseum will host Athletics as well as the main closing ceremony. BMO Stadium will host flag football and lacrosse.

== Public transportation ==
Along the northern edge of the park, the Metro E Line light rail line serves the park with its Expo Park/USC station. On the northeast, (Flower Street and 37th Street), the Metro J Line bus rapid transit serves Exposition Park & USC at its 37th Street/USC Station on the Harbor Transitway. The J Line station is located on the freeway median level of the 1-110 freeway.

== Department of Public Safety ==
The Exposition Park Department of Public Safety provides law enforcement and security services to the Park. DPS officers are California peace officers sworn under section 830.7 of the California Penal Code and have peace officer powers of arrest while on duty. Since 2014, the DPS has been managed under contract by the California Highway Patrol, who provide management, leadership, training, and policy development for the DPS. The Chief of the Department is CHP Captain Adam Smith.

== See also ==
- California State and Consumer Services Agency
- List of parks in Los Angeles
