= Wallis Annenberg Building =

Museum and armory in Los Angeles, California

Coordinates: 34.015710°N 118.283386°W

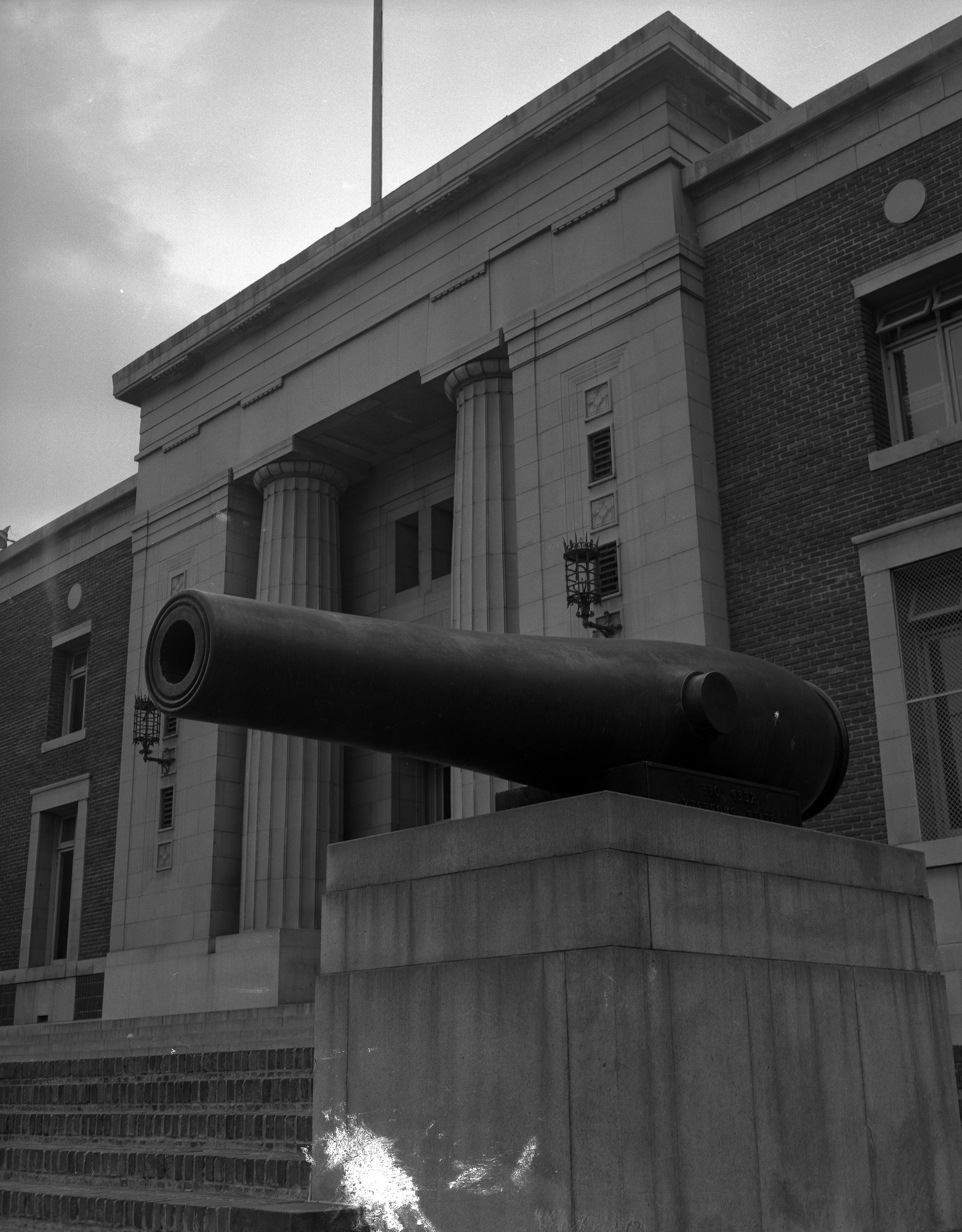
The building in 1956, when it still housed the 160th Infantry Regiment

The Wallis Annenberg Building (originally the 160th Regiment State Armory, and also referred to as the Exposition Park Armory) is a building located in Exposition Park, Los Angeles, California. It was built in 1912 and designed by architect J.W. Wollett. The building served as the armory for the 160th Infantry Regiment between World War I and World War II

The armory hosted the fencing competition at the 1932 Summer Olympics as well as the fencing part of the modern pentathlon. It seated 1,800 for the event. It also served as an exposition hall and ballroom during the early- and mid-20th century. In 1947, the armory was converted into a bowling alley and hosted a tournament of the American Bowling Congress. It later served as a roller derby venue.

The 160th left in 1961, and the building was used as headquarters for the board of trustees of the California State Colleges in the 1960s It then served as exhibit space for the Los Angeles Museum of Science and Industry (now the California Science Center) from the 1960s to the 1980s, before being closed in 1990 due to seismic concerns.

As of 2004, the building is an annex of the California Science Center, serving as the Science Center School and the Amgen Center for Science Learning.

== See also ==
- List of convention centers in the United States
