= Hyde Park Congregational Church (Los Angeles) =

Demolished church in Los Angeles, California, United States

Coordinates: 33.980449°N 118.331220°W

- Location within the Los Angeles metropolitan area
- Location: 6501 Crenshaw Blvd., Hyde Park, Los Angeles, California

Site notes
- Governing body: private

Los Angeles Historic-Cultural Monument
- Designated: May 10, 1963
- Reference no.: 18

Hyde Park Congregational Church was a church in the Hyde Park section of Los Angeles. The original wooden church with two front-corner towers was declared a Los Angeles Historic-Cultural Monument in 1963. Despite the designation, the church was demolished in 1964.

== See also ==
- List of Los Angeles Historic-Cultural Monuments in South Los Angeles
