= John B. Kane Residence =

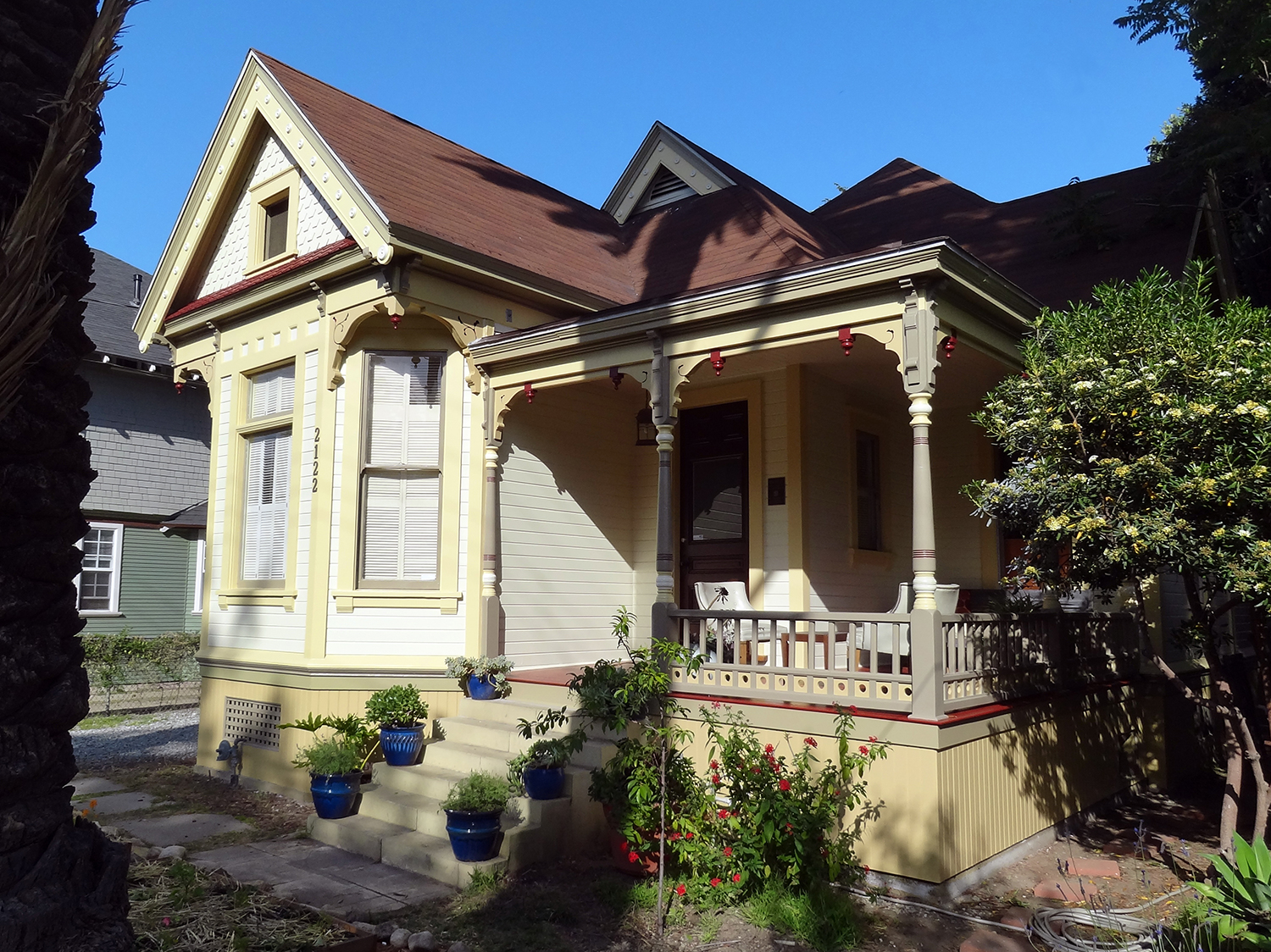
- John B. Kane Residence, May 2012

- Location within the Los Angeles metropolitan area
- 34.03296°N 118.27695°W
- Location: 2122 Bonsallo Avenue, West Adams, Los Angeles, California 90007

History
- Built: 1893

Site notes
- Architect: Fred R. Dorn
- Architectural styles: Queen Anne, Eastlake Victorian
- Governing body: private

Los Angeles Historic-Cultural Monument
- Designated: June 12, 1990
- Reference no.: 500

The John B. Kane Residence is a two-story Queen Anne-Eastlake Victorian house located in West Adams, Los Angeles on Bonsallo Avenue. Built 1892–1893, the house was designated Los Angeles Historic Cultural Monument #500 in June 1990.

== Features ==
The residence was designed by Los Angeles freelance architect Fred R. Dorn. Designer of many houses and buildings throughout Los Angeles and the surrounding areas, including the Balboa Pavilion (1906), Dorn would later go on to work as an associate of Stiles O. Clements of Morgan, Walls & Clements. One of the house's distinguishing features is the three triangle peaks in sequence on the roof, rare in the neighborhood where other Dorn-designed houses typically feature one or two peaks. Behind the house is a two-horse stable that, according to area Sanborn maps, was present when the house was completed.

== West Adams location ==
The residence is located in the Park Villas Tract of what was then known as "Los Angeles City," part of the greater West Adams neighborhood. Located one mile southwest of downtown Los Angeles, the neighborhood was bisected by the Interstate 10 and Interstate 110 freeways built in the 1950s to the northeast that form a hub of the LA freeway system. However, due to the proximity of the freeways there is a noticeable lack of cut-through traffic in the vicinity. Bordering the neighborhood to the West is the Union St-23rd St. business district. Immediately to the South of the residence is Mount St. Mary's College's Doheny campus in University Park, and further South is USC's Annenberg Research Park and the University of Southern California main campus. Bordering to the East is the Figueroa Corridor and the 23rd St Expo Line station.

== See also ==
- Tour University Park in West Adams Area June 9th
- List of Los Angeles Historic-Cultural Monuments in South Los Angeles
