= Margaret Hughes (Los Angeles) =

American politician

Margaret Hughes was the first woman member of the Los Angeles City Board of Education, elected in 1891 but taking her seat in 1892 only after a successful legal battle. She was also active in club and philanthropic work.

== Biography ==
She was born in Baltimore, Maryland, on March 1, 1826, and her family moved thereafter to Philadelphia, Pennsylvania, where she attended school. In 1843 she married Isaac W. Moore, and they had five children. Her husband died in 1856 or 1857, and she then supported herself and her family by tutoring. She married William F. Hughes, president of the Bank of Philadelphia, around 1861. After he died, she moved to Los Angeles in 1874 with a son and purchased property at 14 St. James Place (in what is now called the St. James Park Historic District) in the West Adams district. Her children were Gilbert Stuart Moore, the eldest, of Mount Airy, Philadelphia; Fannie H. (or Mrs. Frances ) Shoemaker, Walter Scott Moore, who became a fire chief of Los Angeles, and Josephine E. Butler, or Mrs. J.W. Landell, of Orange County.

She became active in club and philanthropic work, in 1889 being elected first vice president of the newly formed Friday Morning Club of Los Angeles. In April 1895 she helped organize and was elected president of a woman's society "for the purpose of assisting the doctors in the good work they have undertaken" at the newly formed Polyclinic of Los Angeles.

Mrs. Hughes died in her home on December 27, 1915, after a short illness.

== Board of education ==
On September 7, 1891, the Los Angeles Board of Education met to, among other things, select a new board member to take the place of A.C. Shafer, who had resigned. Seven members of the eight-member board were present, and the first ballot was 3 votes for E.E. Smith, 2 votes for women's activist Caroline Severance and 2 votes for Mrs. Hughes. In a second ballot, Mrs. Hughes received 4 votes and Smith received 3. Nevertheless, Board President Beal ruled that no election had taken place because the board's rules required five affirmative votes for such a decision, and therefore Mrs. Hughes was not seated. The next fortnight Mrs. Hughes stayed home and sent an attorney. After hearing a letter from City Attorney Charles H. McFarland that the Hughes appointment was not valid, the board decided by five votes with three abstentions to appoint William W. Hitchcock to Shafer's seat. In October 1891 Mrs. Hughes received approval of California Attorney-General William H. H. Hart to file a quo warranto suit against Hitchcock, which would have the effect of ousting him if he could not reply satisfactorily.

In his defense, Hitchcock claimed (1) that under a city ordinance all actions by the Board of Education had to receive five votes in favor, no matter how many members were present, and (2) that under another ordinance Mrs. Hughes, because she was not eligible to vote (women not yet having achieved that right in California) could not hold a position on the Board of Education. In June 1892, however, Judge Walter Van Dyke ruled (1) that the city could not overturn the definition of a quorum under common-law parliamentary procedure and (2) that California statutory law allowed women over 21 to serve in educational offices despite their lack of the ability to vote. "Mrs. Hughes, having received four votes of the seven members present and voting, was legally elected and eligible to hold that office, and, having qualified, she is entitled to the same," he wrote. She finally was able to take her seat on the evening of July 5, 1892.

In a June 1893 meeting, Mrs. Hughes protested vigorously against the appointment by the board of a new school superintendent, stating that she had not been consulted in the decision and protesting against the way the board ran its business. She was supported with applause from a number of visitors to the meeting, and she abstained from the vote.
