= James A. Foshay Learning Center =

Location
- 3751 South Harvard Boulevard; Los Angeles, California 90018; 34.01916°N 118.30653°W

Information
- Type: Public
- Established: 1925
- School district: Los Angeles Unified School District
- Principal: Tracy Triplett-Murray
- Grades: K–12
- Enrollment: 1,957 (2015-16)
- Campus: Urban
- Colors: White and Blue
- Mascot: Wolverine
- Website: Official website

James A. Foshay Learning Center (often referred to as Foshay L.C. or Foshay High School or Foshay) is a K-12 Los Angeles Unified School District public school in Los Angeles, California, in the Exposition Park District. It follows a traditional calendar. As part of the Los Angeles Unified School District (LAUSD), it falls into the Local District Central of LAUSD.

== History ==
Established originally as James A. Foshay Junior High School, Foshay L.C. opened in February 1925, named after James A. Foshay, who served as Assistant Superintendent of the Los Angeles public schools in 1893 and later as Superintendent in 1895.

=== Honors ===
- In 2001, it was named a California Distinguished School.
- In 2005, Newsweek ranked it the 413th best high school in America.

== Academics ==
=== Elementary school ===
The elementary school is often referred to as The Village and makes up only a small portion of the student population.

=== Middle school ===
The Middle School (grades 6-8) make up the largest percentage of students at Foshay Learning Center.

=== High school ===
Foshay High School was started in 1994, and the first graduating class was in 1997. To this day Foshay maintains a high school student population of 700-775.

==== Academies ====
Foshay High School created three academies starting in 1995: In 2015, an additional career path was created for Engineering, which merged with the Tech Academy in 2016. They are:

- Academy of Finance (est. 1995 )
- Academy of Technology (est. 1996)
- Academy of Health(est. 1997)
- 9th Grade House (est. 2006)
