= West Adams Terrace, Los Angeles =

West Adams Terrace
- Neighborhood of Los Angeles
- Location within Los Angeles
- Coordinates: 34°01′59″N 118°19′08″W
- Country: United States
- State: California
- County: Los Angeles
- Time zone: Pacific
- Zip Code: 90018
- Area code: 323

West Adams Terrace is a neighborhood in the West Adams area of Los Angeles. Dating back to 1905, it contains seven Los Angeles Historic-Cultural Monuments, one property on the National Register of Historic Places and one Green Book property. In 2003, the neighborhood was designated a Historic Preservation Overlay Zone.

== History ==
In 1905, West Adams Terrace was platted in from what had been called the Bauer tract. The area on the north side of Adams Street (west of Western Avenue) was under the control of the Mesa Land Company, a syndicate headed by William Miles, president, and Charles McKenzie, H.R. Callender, S.J. White and C.G. Andrews. Noted as "the last piece of available elevated land [with] a magnificent view of the valley and surrounding foothills", the land was divided into 235 lots with building restrictions ranging from $2,500 to $5,000. The earliest use of the name "West Adams Terrace" in the Los Angeles Times was on July 16, 1905. The area was then described as a "beautiful residence subdivision" with lots being sold for $40,000.

During the next few years, the Times continued to report sales in the neighborhood. On March 6, 1910, the Times announced that architect A.B. Benton had completed plans for a residence for F.M. Vale on Eleventh Avenue in West Adams Terrace.

In the 1950s, a Green Book property serving African-American tourists was located in the neighborhood. The name West Adams Terrace continued to be used for residential sales in both the Los Angeles Times and the Los Angeles Sentinel.

== Geography ==
In 1905, the Times noted that West Adams Terrace was located between Adams Street on the south and Twenty-third Street on the north and between Eighth Avenue on the east and Twelfth Avenue on the west. In 1906, the Times noted a different boundary - Thirteenth Avenue on the west.

In 2002, the city defined the area as: the north side of West Adams Boulevard on the south, the Santa Monica I-10 Freeway on the north, the rear lot line of the parcels on the west side of Thirteenth Avenue on the west, and the west side of Western Avenue on the east.

== Historic Preservation Overlay Zone ==
On December 2, 2003, the Los Angeles City Council adopted The West Adams Terrace HPOZ (Historic Preservation Overlay Zone). The designation reflected the high concentration of Craftsman and Colonial Revival architectural styles as well as the neighborhood's high level of architectural integrity from the period in which the properties were constructed (1887-1951).

The West Adams Terrace HPOZ is bounded by 13th Avenue to the west, the Santa Monica Freeway to the north, Gramercy Place, 24th Street, and Western Avenue to the east, and West Adams Boulevard to the south (excluding both Joseph Pomeroy Widney High and the 24th Street Elementary School from the HPOZ).

== Historic-Cultural Monuments ==
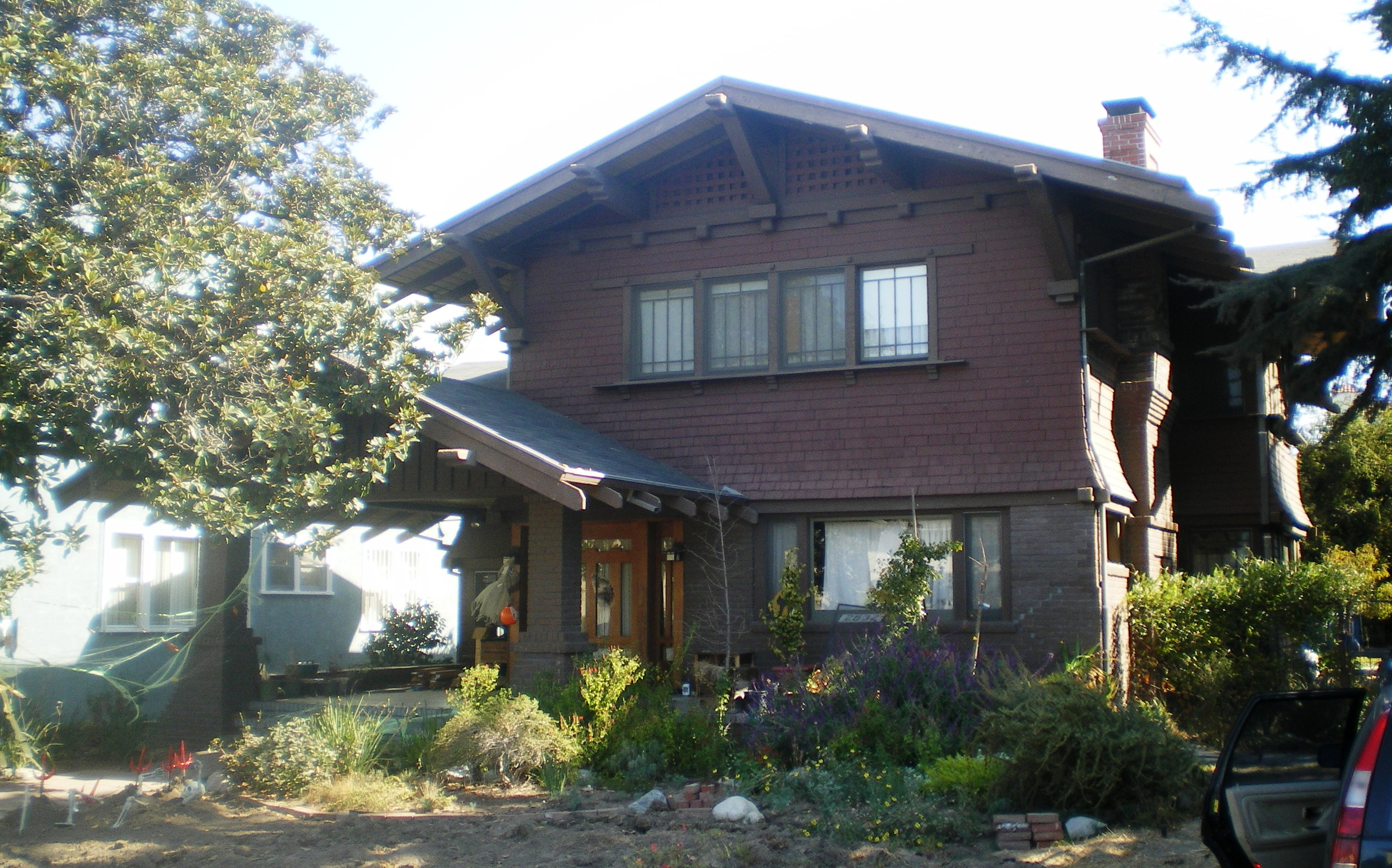
Gordon L. McDonough House, 2008 2532 5th Avenue

(listed in order of HCM number)

- William Andrews Clark Memorial Library - 2520 Cimarron Street.Historic-Cultural Monument #28
- Eugene W. Britt House - 2141 W. Adams Boulevard. Historic-Cultural Monument #197
- Ramsay-Durfee Estate - 2425 S. Western Avenue. - Historic-Cultural Monument #230
- Fitzgerald House - 3125 W. Adams Boulevard. Historic-Cultural Monument #258.
- The Gordon L. McDonough House – 2532 5th Avenue. Designed by Frank M. Tyler. Historic-Cultural Monument #417.
- Auguste R. Marquis Residence - 2501 Arlington Avenue. Fisher & Sons Funeral Home in the HBO show Six Feet Under. Historic-Cultural Monument #602.
- Alice Lynch Residence - 2414 4th Avenue. Designed by Henry Harwood Hewitt and John Byers. Historic-Cultural Monument #621.
- Dryden Residence - 3825 W. Adams Boulevard. Historic-Cultural Monument #705.
- Joseph Dupy Residence-South Seas Edwardian - 2301 W. 24th Street. Historic-Cultural Monument #757.

== Notable properties ==
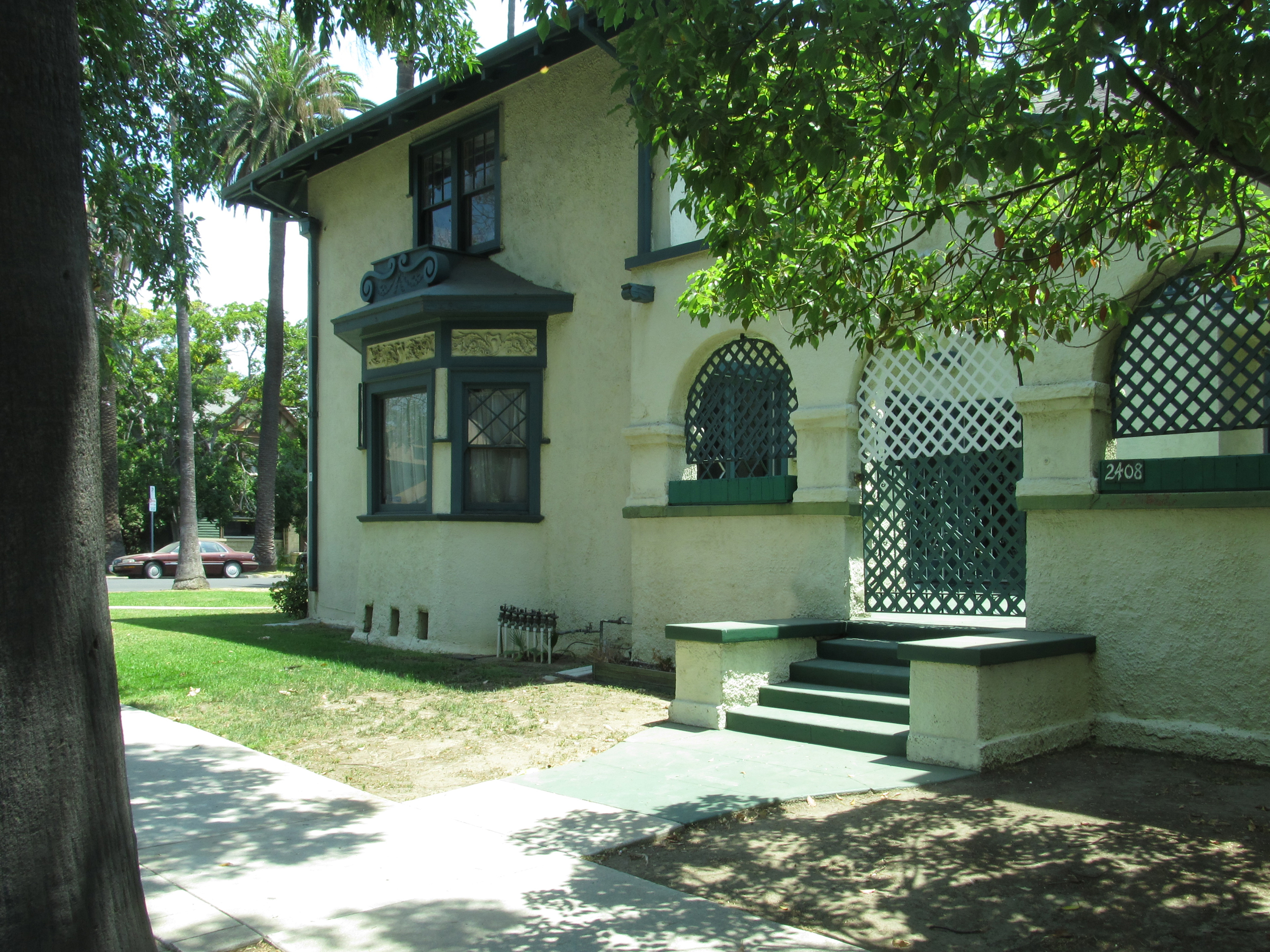
Valle Vista Tourist Home, 2021 2408 Cimarron Street

- The Valle Vista Tourist Home - 2408 Cimarron Street. Serving African-American tourists, the Valle Vista Tourist home was listed in the Green Book from 1951 to 1961.
- McCarty Memorial Christian Church - 4101 West Adams Boulevard. Listed on the National Register of Historic Places.

== Education ==
LAUSD has two schools in West Adams Terrace:

- Joseph Pomeroy Widney High, special education - 2302 South Gramercy Place
- 24th Street Elementary School - 2055 W 24th Street.

In 2013, 24th Street Elementary School became the first campus in Los Angeles to make use of a "parent trigger" law that enabled parents to install a new administration. The school failed to meet the state's educational standards in English and mathematics. The parents voted to take control of the school, and organize it as a hybrid charter school, with the Los Angeles Unified School District operating kindergarten through 5th grade and a private entity, Crown Prep Academy, running grades 5 through 8.

== Parks and recreation ==
- South Seas House - 2301 W. 24th Street. Facility offers after school club, seasonal camps (Spring, Summer, Winter), "Tiny Tot Creative Movement" dance, pre-ballet, computer lab, private & group piano, preschool, guitar and tutoring
