= Machell-Seaman House =

Historic house in California, United States

- U.S. National Register of Historic Places
- Los Angeles Historic-Cultural Monument
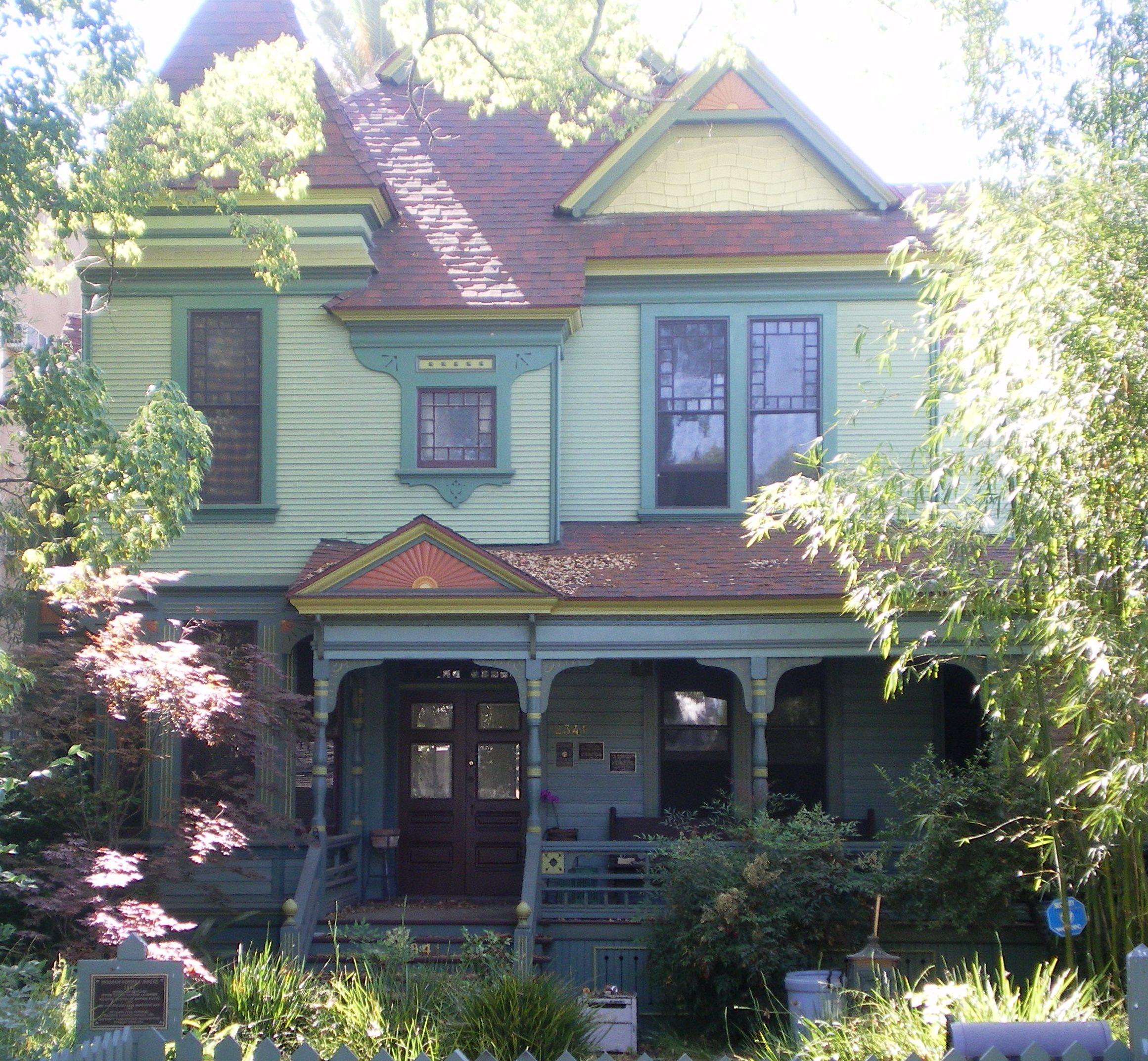
- Machell-Seaman House, May 2008

- Location within the Los Angeles metropolitan area Location within California Location within the United States
- Location: 2341 Scarff Street, West Adams, Los Angeles, 90007
- Coordinates: 34°1′55″N 118°16′46″W
- Built: 1888
- Architect: Joseph Cather Newsom
- Architectural style: Queen Anne-Eastlake Victorian
- NRHP reference No.: 88000922
- LAHCM No.: 408

Significant dates
- Added to NRHP: June 23, 1988
- Designated LAHCM: January 20, 1989

The Machell-Seaman House, also known as the Seaman House and the Seaman-Foshay House, is a Queen Anne-Eastlake style Victorian house in the West Adams section of Los Angeles, California. The house was built in 1888 and designed by architect Joseph Cather Newsom. The house was listed on the National Register of Historic Places in 1988 based on its well-preserved architecture. In 1989, it was declared a Historic-Cultural Monument (No. 408) by the Los Angeles Cultural Heritage Commission.

== See also ==
- List of Registered Historic Places in Los Angeles
- List of Los Angeles Historic-Cultural Monuments in South Los Angeles
- West Adams, Los Angeles
