= Exposition Park Rose Garden =

Coordinates: 34.017°N 118.286°W

- U.S. National Register of Historic Places
- U.S. Historic district
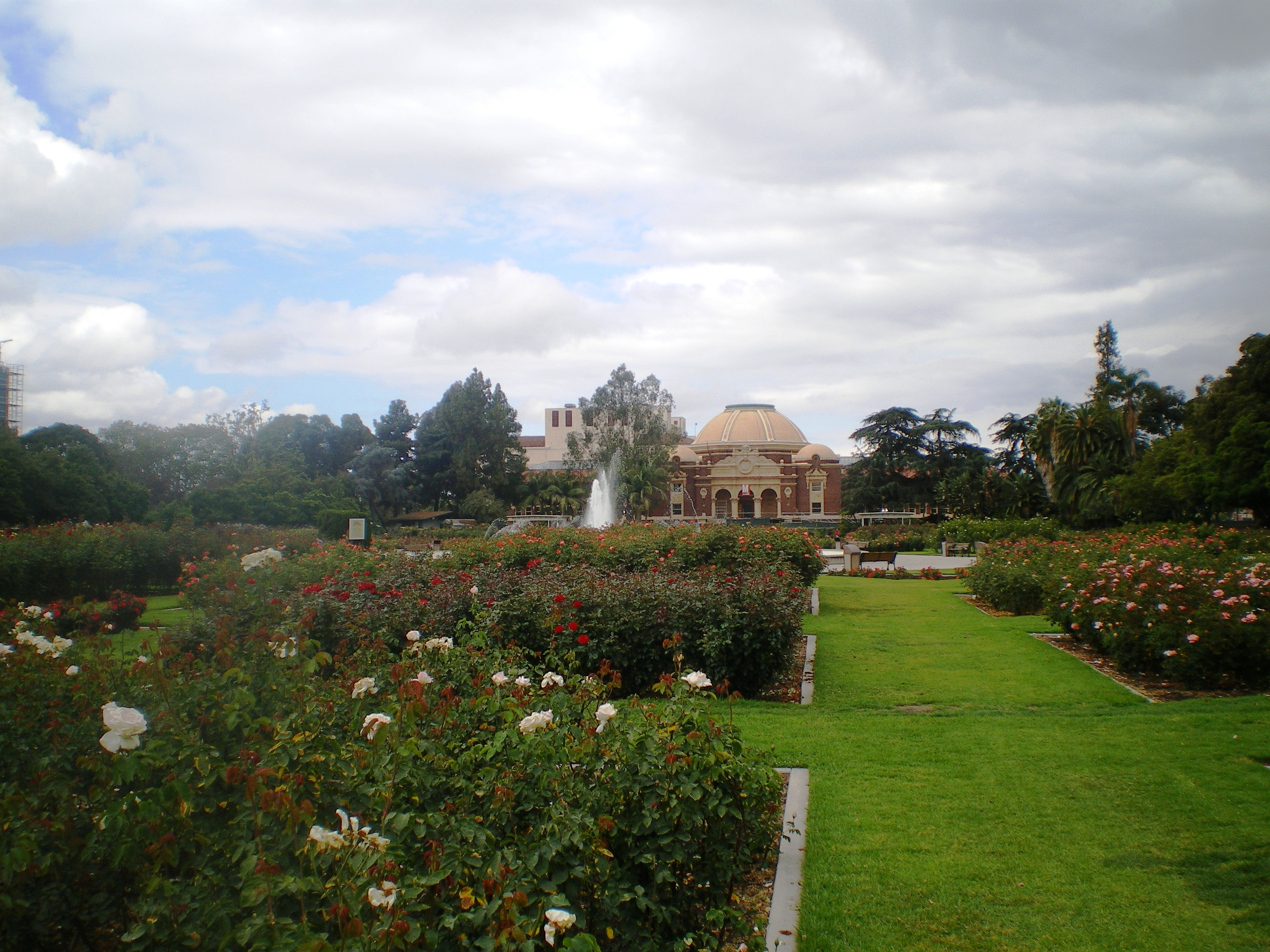
- Exposition Park Rose Garden, 2008

- Location within Los Angeles
- Location: 701 State Dr, Los Angeles, California, United States
- NRHP reference No.: 91000285
- Added to NRHP: March 28, 2019

The Exposition Park Rose Garden is a historic 7-acre (28,000 m^{2}) sunken garden located in Exposition Park in Los Angeles, California. It has been called "one of the city's best-kept secrets". It was added to the National Register of Historic Places in 1991.

== Establishment of the rose garden ==
From 1871 to 1911, the site of the rose garden was part of the city's Agricultural Park. The rose garden area was then used for horse, camel, dog, and later automobile racing; it also reportedly housed the city's longest bar and "one of its most stylish brothels." In 1914, the city announced plans to construct a wildflower garden at the park, but the rose garden was not built until 1927 with the planting of 15,000 bushes of more than 100 varieties. When the garden was announced, the Los Angeles Times applauded the project: "No more fitting tribute could be paid to the spirit of Southern California than to erect in the center of her largest city the greatest rose garden in the world." During the Great Depression, the lack of funding threatened the closure of the rose garden, then [erroneously] described as "the largest rose garden in the world."

== Boldsen statues ==
In 1936, four large marble statues by Danish sculptor Thyra Boldsen were installed on pedestals at the four corners of the garden. The statues were titled "Nymph Finding Pipes of Pan," "The Blessing" (dedicated to the mothers of the world), "The Start" (awarded first prize by the Danish Academy of Fine Arts), and "Terpsichore" (or "Melody of Life"). The sculptor explained her intent with the statues this way: "In conceiving and executing these four figures dedicated to womanhood and motherhood, I have had in mind that men for centuries have erected statues symbolizing bravery—these symbolize love, life and joy."

== Popularity of the Rose Garden ==
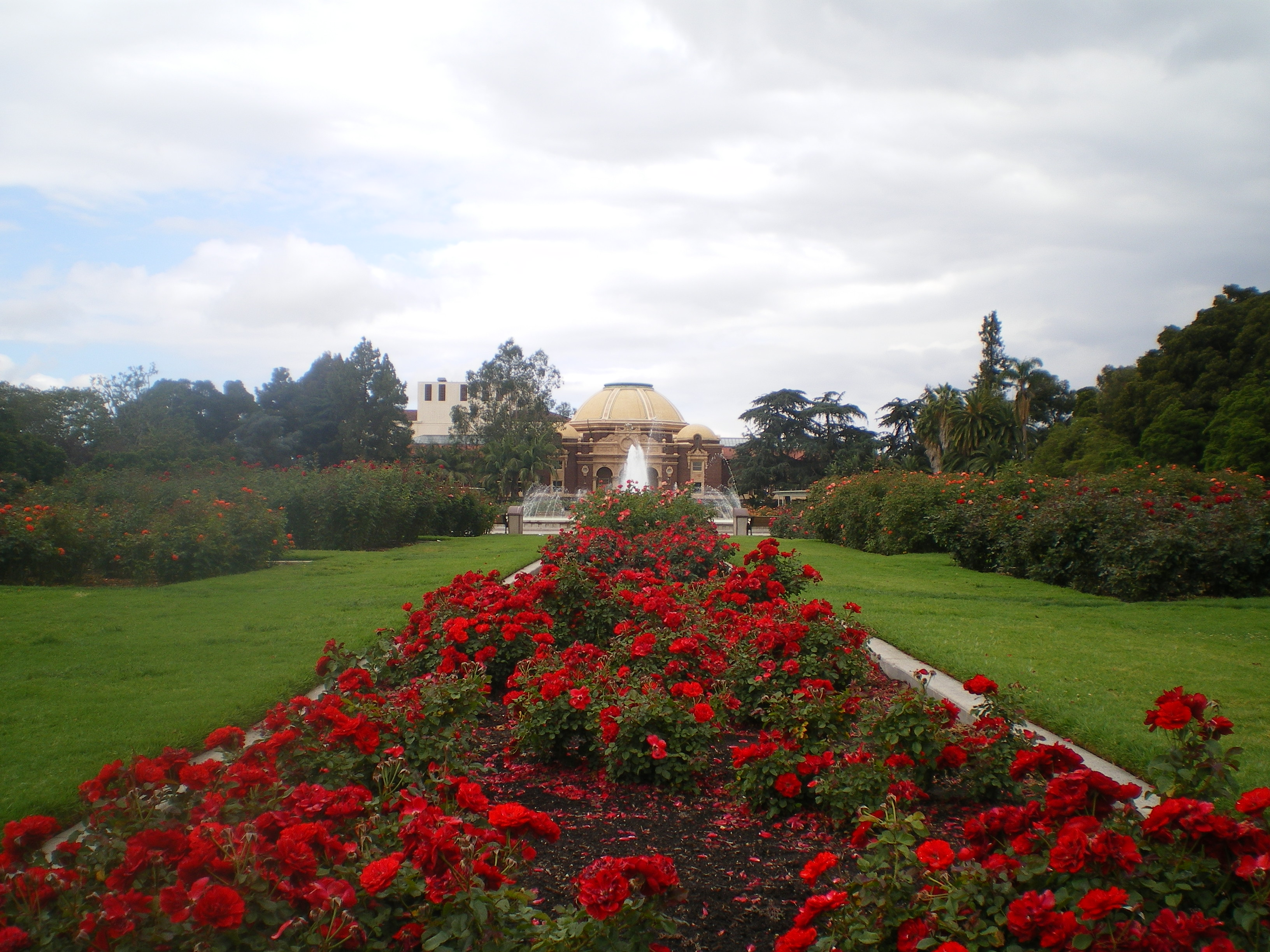
Rose garden in May 2008

In the 1950s, the annual pruning demonstration drew thousands of rose enthusiasts to the park. By the mid-1980s, the garden had more than 20,000 rose bushes and more than 200 varieties of roses. The All-America Rose Selection, a rose growers organization, began donating its Rose of the Year to the garden in 1940. The garden is reportedly visited by more than a million people a year and is a popular location for weddings, reflection, and other events. The garden also has four gazebos, several statues, and a central fountain. The garden is located adjacent to the University of Southern California campus, the Natural History Museum of Los Angeles County, and the California Science Center.

== Threat to the Rose Garden and historic designation ==
In 1986, plans to dig up the garden to build an underground parking garage led to protests in the media. The Los Angeles Times ran an editorial opposing the plan: "There are times when the leaders of Los Angeles seem perversely intent on living up to the image that many outsiders have of them—insensitive and uncouth rabbits who would, say, dig up a garden to put in a parking lot." The garden had also been threatened by an earlier proposal by the Los Angeles Raiders football team to convert the garden into a practice field for the team. In order to protect the garden from such threats, it was added to the National Register of Historic Places in 1991.

== Film and television ==
The exterior of the Old Armory Building, abutting the eastern edge of the Rose Garden, is used in establishing shots of the fictional Jeffersonian Institute, in the TV series Bones.

The gardens were used also for The TV show “Buffy The Vampire Slayer” in the Season two episode “Inca Mummy Girl”.

The garden can also be seen at the end of the Barbra Streisand film On a Clear Day You Can See Forever .

Jane Fonda and Don Johnson characters, in the 2018 film, Book Club frolic in the rose garden fountain during a date scene.

The garden was featured in Visiting... with Huell Howser Episode 908.

== See also ==
- List of Registered Historic Places in Los Angeles
