= Colonel Green =

Colonel Green may refer to:

- Colonel Phillip Green, a fictional villain in the Star Trek universe
- Edward Howland Robinson Green, also called Colonel Green, American heir, stamp and coin collector
- Colonel George Gill Green, an American doctor and Civil War commander
