= Neff Park =

Park in California

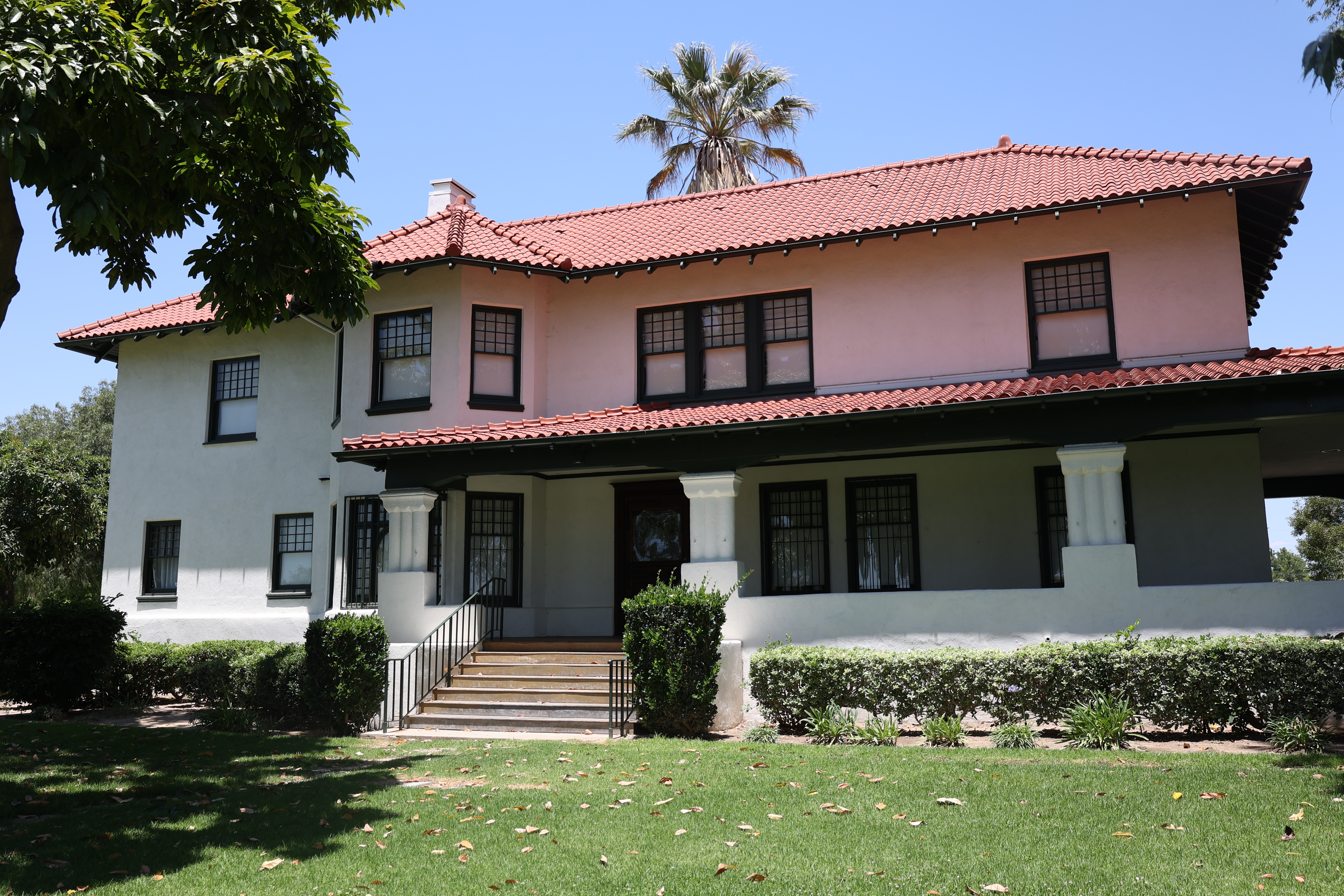
- Neff Home in 2026
- Interactive map of Neff Park
- Location: 14300 San Cristobal Dr, La Mirada, CA 90638
- Area: 10 acres (4.0 ha)
- Created: 1980
- Owner: City of La Mirada
- McNally's Windemere Ranch Headquarters
- U.S. National Register of Historic Places
- Location within the Los Angeles metropolitan area Location within California Location within the United States
- Coordinates: 33.8981°N 118.0253°W
- Area: 3 acres (1.2 ha)
- Built: 1894
- Architect: Frederick Roehrig
- NRHP reference No.: 78000684
- Added to NRHP: July 20, 1978

Neff Park is a 10 acres (4.0 ha) park in La Mirada, California. It contains three historic buildings built in the late-19th century: Neff Home, George House, and Neff Barn; 3 acres (1.2 ha) of the park, including the buildings, were listed on the National Register of Historic Places in 1978.

== History ==
The Neff Home was built in 1894 by Frederick Roehrig as a headquarters for the Edwin Neff family, the founders of La Mirada, in their Windermere Ranch. Andrew McNally's Neff's father-in-law, initially purchased part of the Rancho Los Coyotes in 1888 and commissioned Roehrig in 1892 as a gift for his daughter and son-in-law. McNally lived in the Andrew McNally House in Altadena while Neff ran the ranch. The 10 acres (4.0 ha) of grounds surrounding the buildings was the only land kept by the Neff family after they sold most of their property to Jack Spears of the Pioneer Land and Realty Company of Los Angeles in 1953. Three generations of the Neff family lived in the home, with the last being William and Mina Neff—William was McNally's grandson and the namesake of the park. The grounds were donated to the Southeast Parks and Recreation Commission in 1963.

After the City of La Mirada came into possession of the Neff estate in 1980, officials rejected proposals that would have made the site a major historical attraction, instead choosing a smaller approach. In 1983, the city commissioned former chief restoration architect for the Canadian government Martin Weil to do a study on the buildings. Weil's plan included the conversion of the Neff Barn into a period-themed restaurant and the implementation of tour programs and a visitor reception area. The city council appointed a committee to prepare a scaled-down version of Weil's proposal in 1985; they had previously issued a memorandum in 1984 stating that Neff Park's primary purpose would be recreation. From 1991–92, the Neff Home underwent a nearly-$1 million renovation and restoration. The building then became a target for vandalism and tagging, leading to the city spending $14,000 in security expenditures.

== Description ==
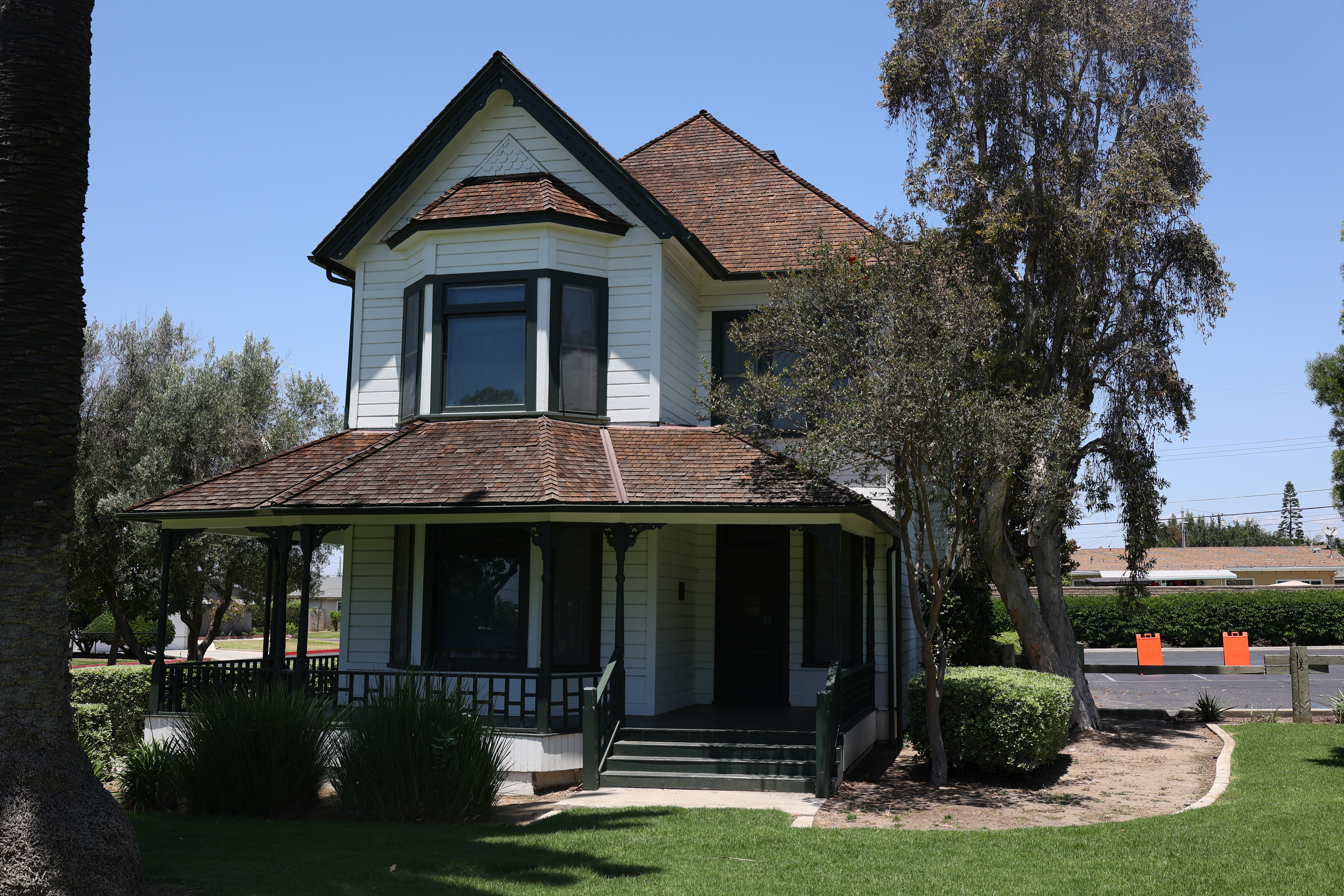
George House in 2026

The Neff Home, a two-story ranch house, contains eleven rooms. Its red-tiled roof uses the Monk and Nun arrangement style, with a wood shingle and stucco exterior. The two-story George House, built in 1888 and the residence of the estate's caretaker, contains a veranda with Eastlake embellishments and a bay window on the second floor.

The Neff Barn contains historic memorabilia and serves as a special events and group center. It is not necessarily in original condition as it received major interior and exterior alterations in 1965 and 1966. The window and door sizes were changed and the roof was reshingled.

Aside from the historic buildings, the park also contains a gazebo, basketball and tennis court, playground, horseshoe pits, and picnic areas. The tennis court was originally located by the Neff Barn, but it was later landscaped over and moved to be adjacent to the park entrance. The gazebo replaced a prior original fountain from the estate. Two bronze sphinx previously marked the entrance of the ranch, but they have since gone missing.
