= Las Vegas station (New Mexico) =

Amtrak train station in Las Vegas, New Mexico

Las Vegas, NM
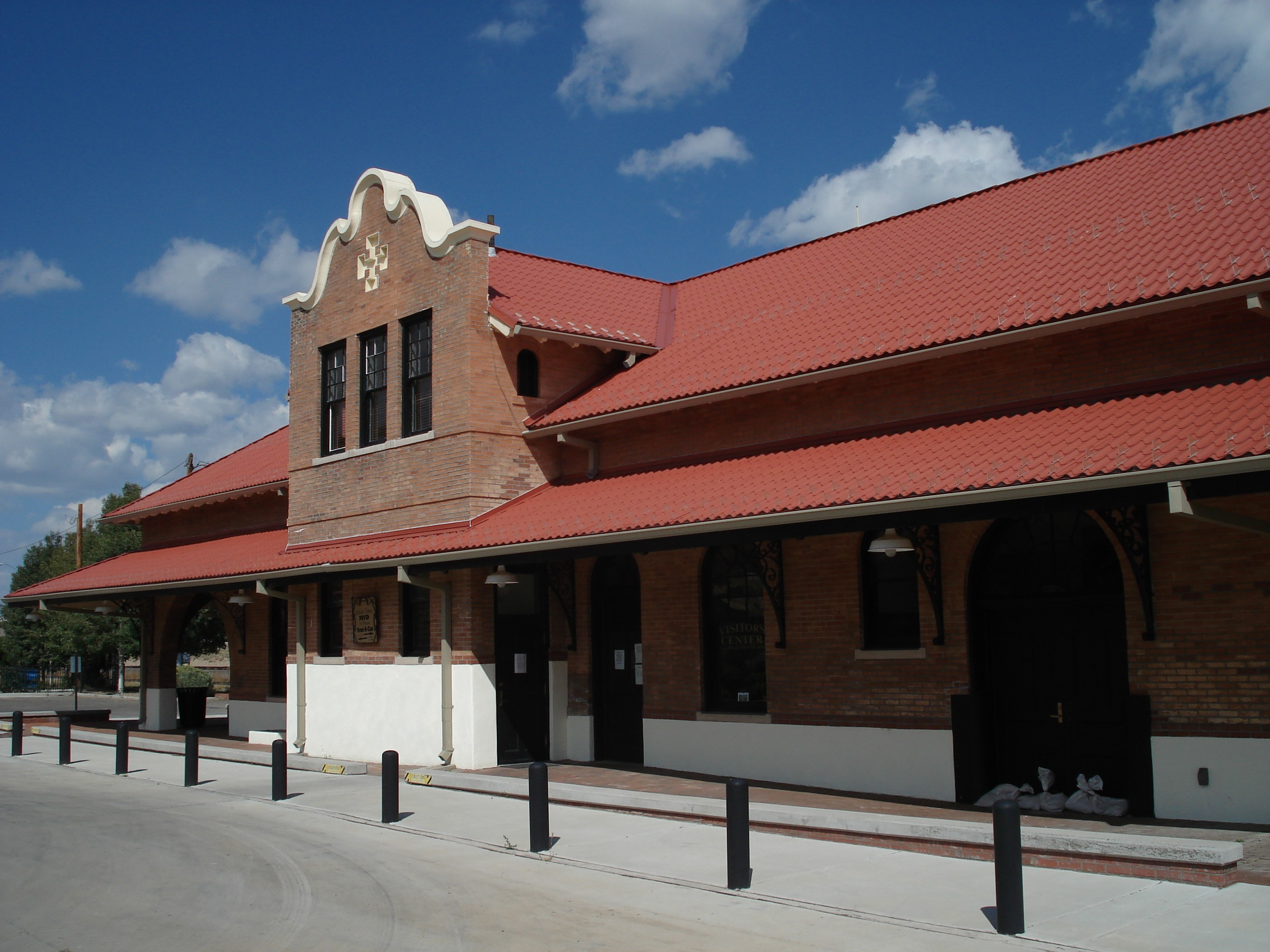
- The Las Vegas Amtrak station in 2007

General information
- Location: Railroad Avenue and Lincoln Street; Las Vegas, New Mexico
- Coordinates: 35.5935°N 105.2126°W
- Line: BNSF Railway Raton / Glorieta Subdivisions
- Platforms: 1 side platform
- Tracks: 2

Other information
- Station code: Amtrak: LSV

History
- Opened: July 4, 1879
- Rebuilt: –January 17, 1899

Passengers
- FY 2025: 4,165 (Amtrak)

Services
Preceding station	Amtrak	Following station
Lamy toward Los Angeles	Southwest Chief	Raton toward Chicago
Former services
Preceding station	Atchison, Topeka and Santa Fe Railway	Following station
Romero toward Los Angeles	Main Line	Watrous toward Chicago
Location

Las Vegas station is an Amtrak train station at Railroad Avenue and Lincoln Street in Las Vegas, New Mexico. Built in 1899, the two-story brick station building was designed in the Spanish Mission style and features a red tile roof, ornate metal brackets and a curving parapet. The station was renovated in 2000, when approximately $1.2 million was secured from federal, state and private sources. It reopened as the Las Vegas Intermodal Facility and now houses a passenger waiting room and the city's Visitor Center.

The station is near the Castañeda Hotel, a former hotel built by Fred Harvey for the Atchison, Topeka and Santa Fe Railway. The hotel's architects were Frederick Roehrig and A. Reinsch. The hotel is the oldest Mission Revival Style building in the state of New Mexico, opening for business on January 17, 1899.

The station and former hotel are contributing properties to the Railroad Avenue Historic District.

== Routes ==
- Southwest Chief

== See also ==
- List of Amtrak stations

== Bibliography ==
- Federal Writers' Project (1940). New Mexico: A Guide to the Colorful State. Coronado Cuarto Centennial Commission. ISBN 9781623760304.
