= Railroad Avenue Historic District (Las Vegas, New Mexico) =

Historic district in New Mexico, United States

- U.S. National Register of Historic Places
- U.S. Historic district
- NM State Register of Cultural Properties
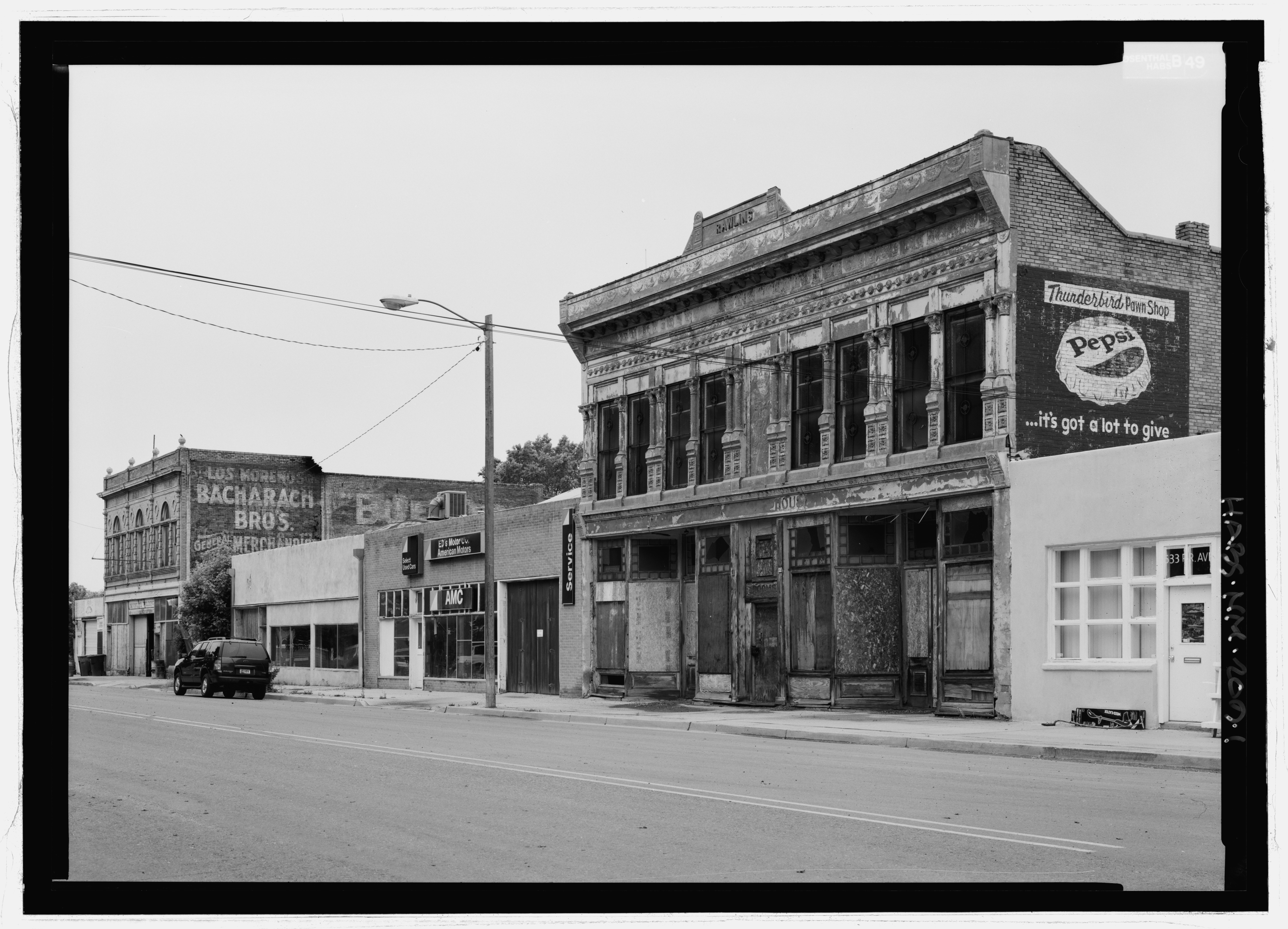
- View south along Railroad Ave. from the Rawlins Building, 2005

- Location within New Mexico Location within the United States
- Location: U.S. Route 85, Las Vegas, New Mexico
- Coordinates: 35°35′38″N 105°12′45″W
- NRHP reference No.: 79001551
- NMSRCP No.: 344

Significant dates
- Added to NRHP: August 6, 1979
- Designated NMSRCP: August 28, 1974

The Railroad Avenue Historic District is a historic district listed on the National Register of Historic Places in Las Vegas, New Mexico. It encompasses three blocks of Railroad Avenue between Jackson Street and University Avenue, as well as the first block of Lincoln Avenue. The buildings in the district were directly related to the presence of the Atchison, Topeka and Santa Fe Railway in Las Vegas and date from between 1879 and 1920.

== Notable buildings ==
Name	Image	Location	Year built	Style	Notes
Castañeda Hotel		541 Railroad Ave.	1899	Mission Revival	Two-story brick hotel with arcade, courtyard, and tower
Santa Fe Depot		Railroad Ave. and Lincoln St.	1899	Mission Revival	Two-story brick railroad station
Gross Kelly Mercantile Building		Railroad Ave. and Lincoln St.	1898	Renaissance Revival	Two-story brick building with attached warehouse
Golden Rule Furnishings		411 Railroad Ave.	1881		Two-story, two bay rubble stone commercial building with brick facing and twisted cast iron columns
Wells Fargo Building		613 Lincoln St.	1908	Neoclassical Revival	Three-story, three bay brick commercial building
Center Block		Lincoln St. and Grand Ave.	1899	Richardsonian Romanesque	Two-story brick corner block with conical tower. Collapsed during a rainstorm in 2006 and was subsequently demolished.
Strousse and Bacharach Building		515 Railroad Ave.	c. 1900		Two-story, three bay brick commercial building
Rawlins Building		529 Railroad Ave.	1899–1902	Neoclassical Revival	Two-story, eight bay brick building with cast iron front. At one time, the building housed a dormitory for Harvey Girls who worked at the Castañeda.
