= Andrew McNally House =

Historic house in California, United States

- U.S. National Register of Historic Places
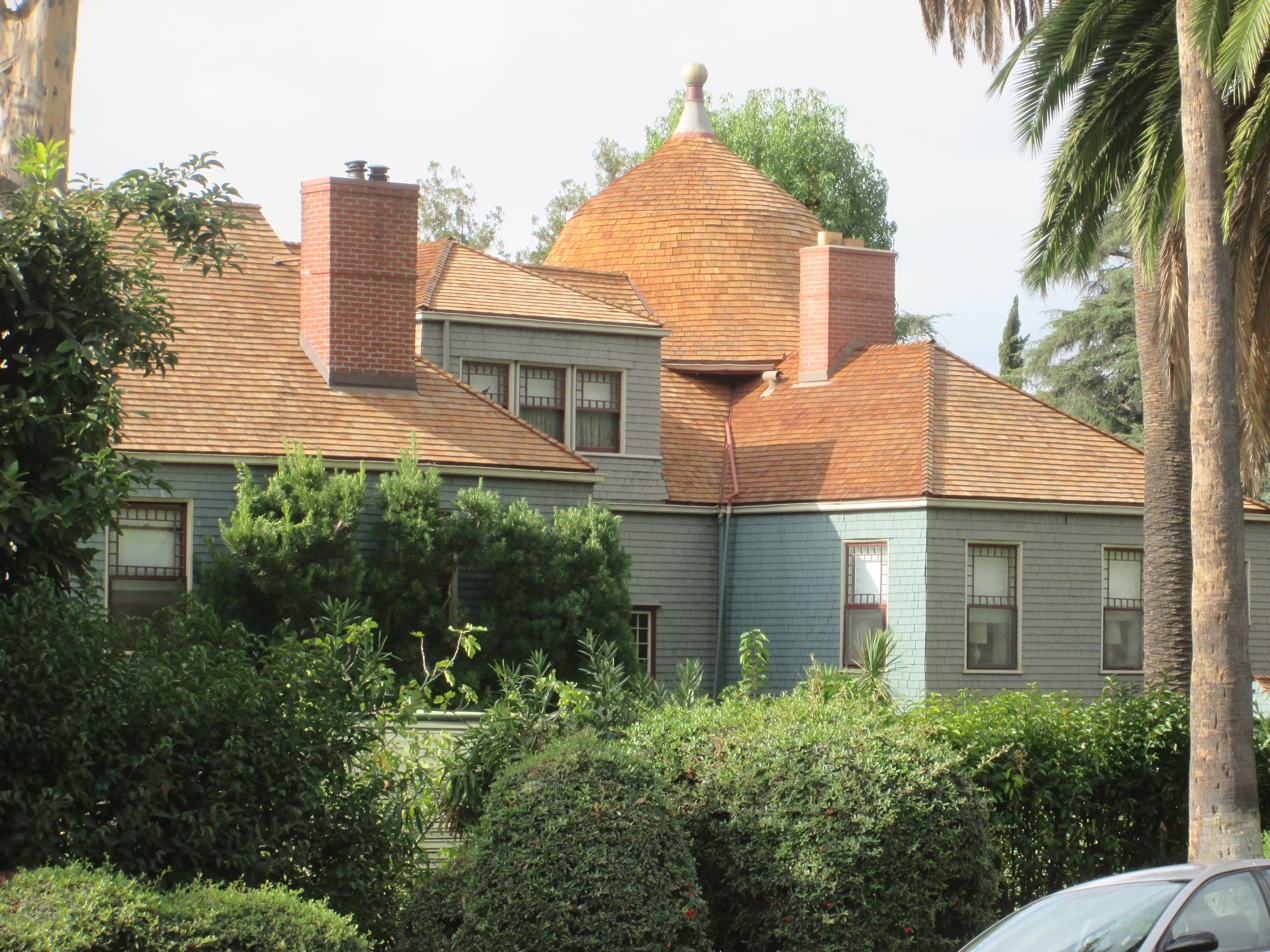
- The house in 2014

- Location within the Los Angeles metropolitan area Location within California Location within the United States
- Location: 654 E. Mariposa St; Altadena, California
- Coordinates: 34°11′20″N 118°08′10″W
- Built: 1887
- Architect: Frederick L. Roehrig
- Architectural style: Queen Anne
- Demolished: 2025 (Eaton Fire)
- NRHP reference No.: 07000245
- Added to NRHP: March 27, 2007

The Andrew McNally House in Altadena, California was the home of Andrew McNally (1838–1904), co-founder and president of the Rand McNally publishing company. The Queen Anne Style house was listed in the National Register of Historic Places. It remained a private house, until it was destroyed by the Eaton Fire on January 8, 2025.

== History ==
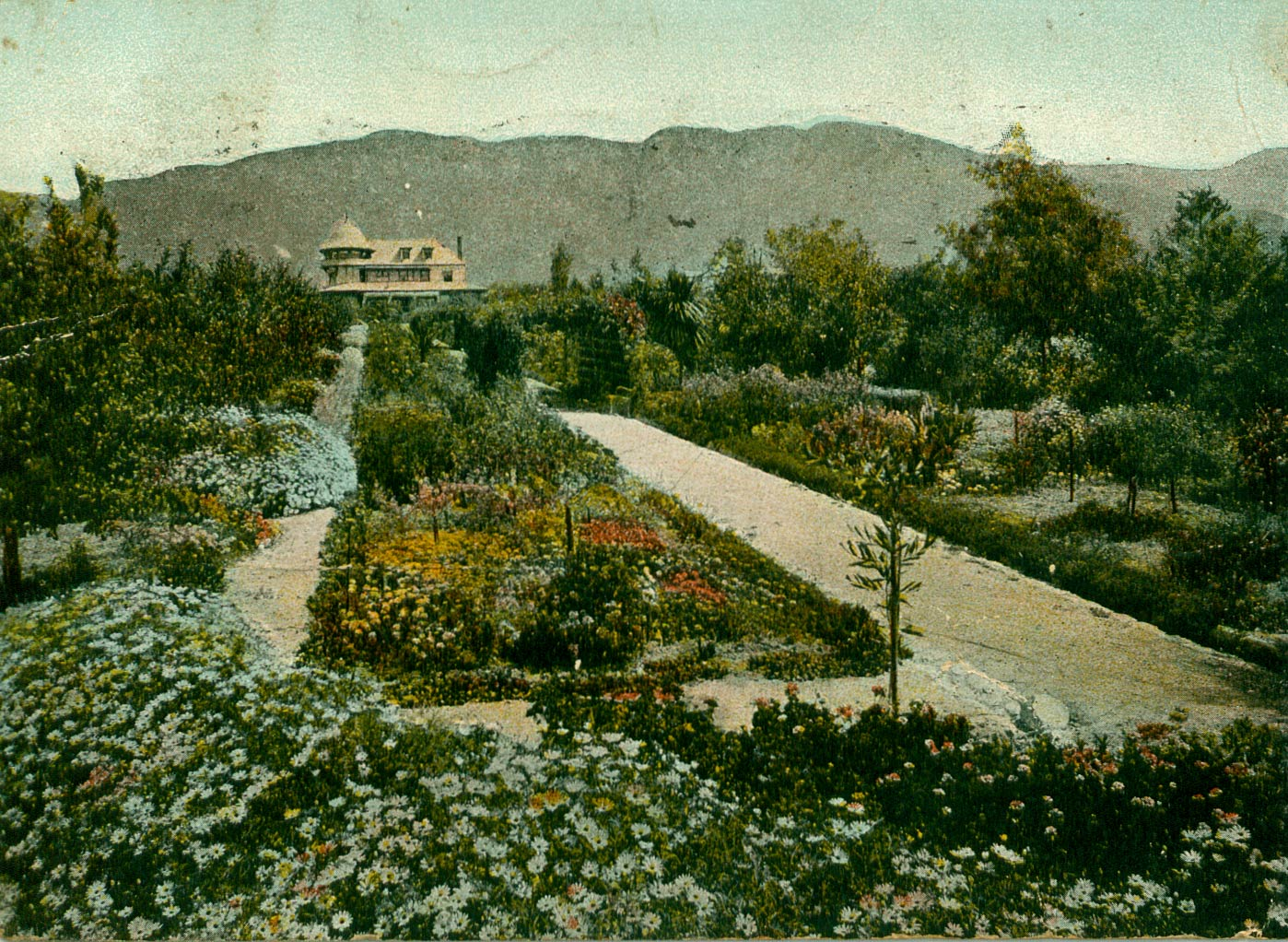
A postcard from around 1900 showing the house and gardens.

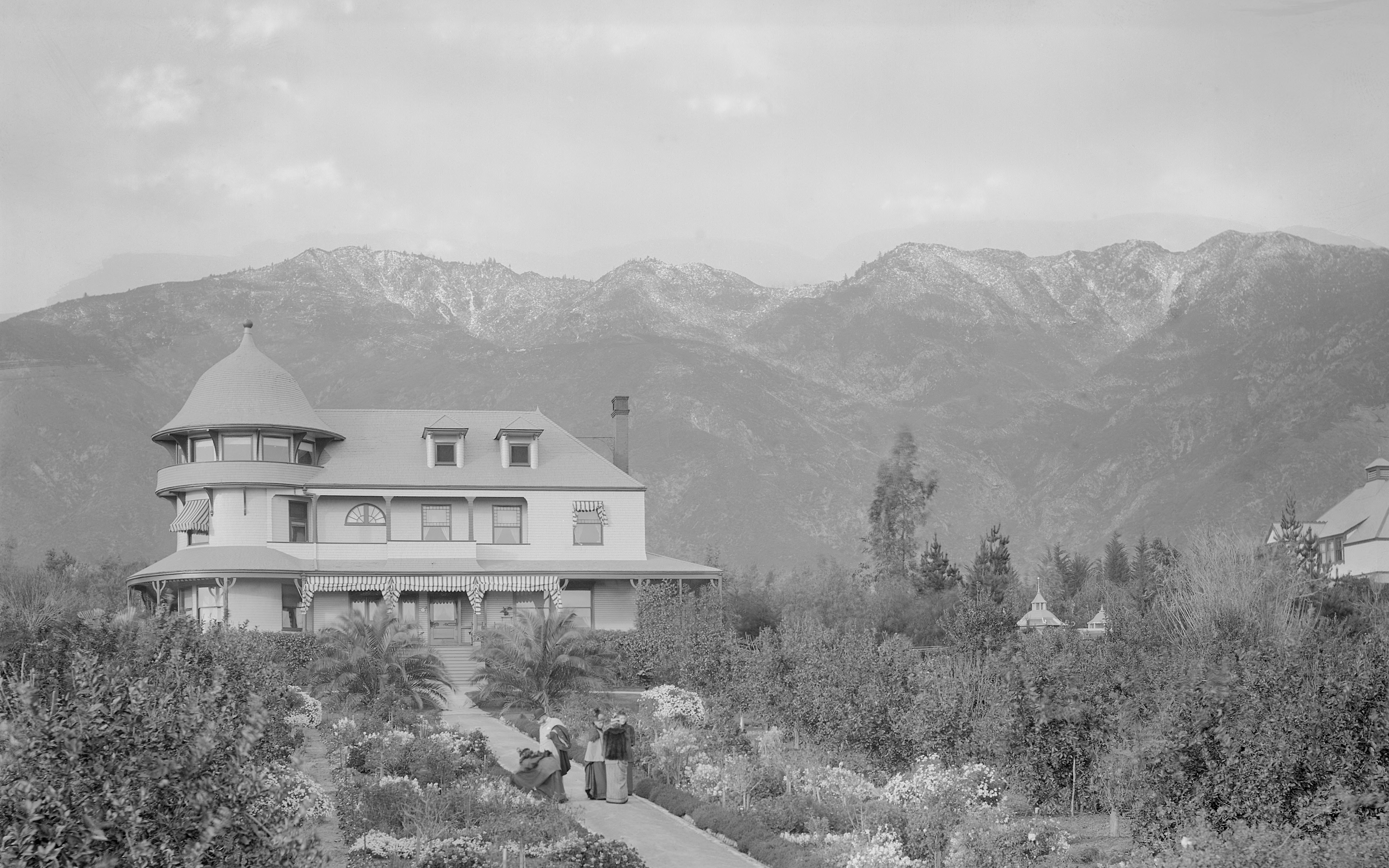
Exterior view of the Andrew McNally residence in Altadena, ca.1900

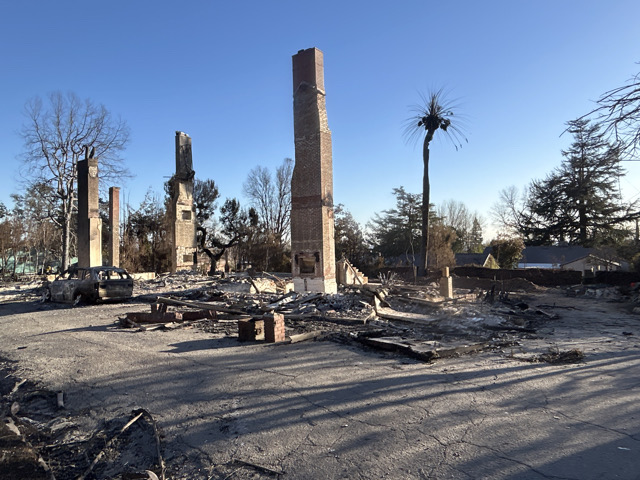
Ruins of the house shortly after the Eaton Fire in 2025

McNally was an Irish immigrant who worked as a printer. When he came to the United States, he first worked for the Chicago Tribune when he met William Rand. Together they formed the company that bears their names. In 1880, McNally took his fortune and family and moved west They lived for a time in Pasadena, California before building a mansion in Altadena in 1887. The mansion was located on East Mariposa Street at Santa Rosa Avenue. McNally was a booster of the life in Altadena, and convinced friends to move to the area. McNally's friends subsequently built mansions along Mariposa, which soon began to be known locally as "Millionaire's Row".

McNally paid Pasadena architect Frederick Roehrig $15,000 to design the Queen Anne Victorian house. The 6,938-square-foot single-family house had a total of 22 rooms and was built in 1890.

Facing south, away from the street, the house offered vistas of the Los Angeles Basin, the Pacific Ocean, and Santa Catalina Island. The house had a three-story rotunda that allowed a view to the San Gabriel Mountains to the north. McNally also built a private rail spur from Altadena Junction to his property to store his private railroad car. The grounds were lavishly landscaped, with an aviary along Mariposa St. His gardener also looked after the deodar cedars that grew along Santa Rosa Avenue. These trees became Christmas Tree Lane, which is also listed in the National Register.

In 1904, McNally caught pneumonia while en route to his Windemere Ranch in La Mirada, California. (The ranch headquarters is also listed in the National Register.) He died shortly afterward. The gardens and aviary were neglected, and some of the birds escaped. The property was then subdivided.

The Sylvestre Dupuy family bought the house in 1955 and restored it. An episode of the television show Restored featured one major phase of the restoration on an episode that aired in early 2021. The Dupuy family sold the house in the autumn of 2021 for $3,000,000.

Starting in 1921, the house was repeatedly used as a filming location for media productions, beginning with Max Linder's Seven Years Bad Luck. Other productions filmed at the home include Ratched, Palm Royale, HBO's Entourage and Hacks.

The Andrew McNally House was destroyed by the Eaton Fire on January 8, 2025.
