= Mission Revival architecture =

Architectural movement and style

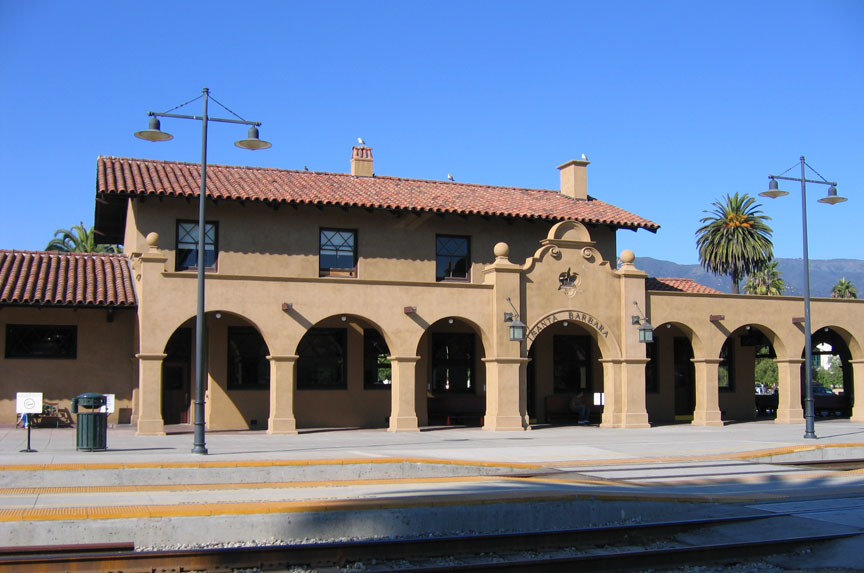
Santa Barbara station, built in 1902 in Santa Barbara, California, an example of a railroad depot in Mission Revival Style

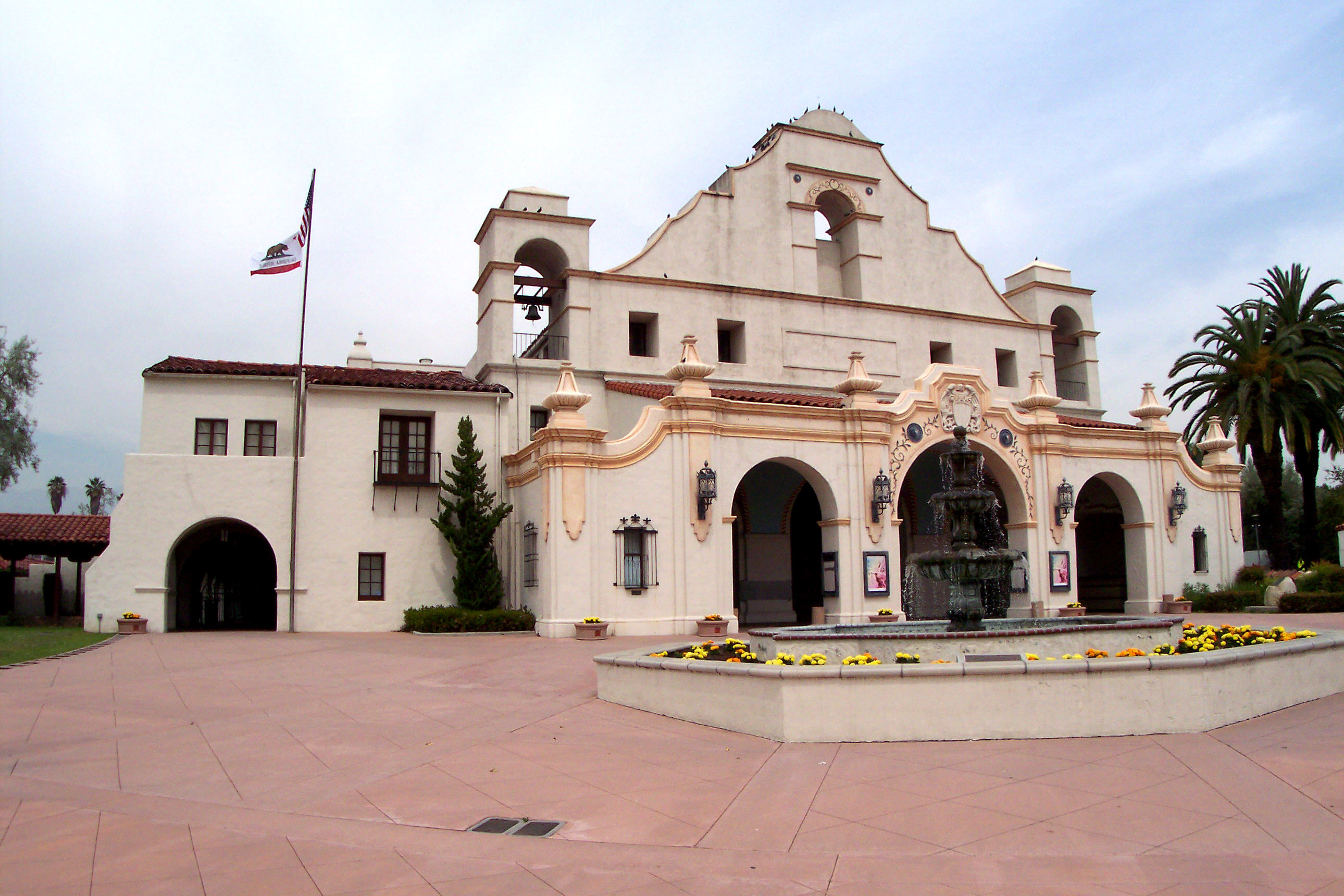
San Gabriel Civic Auditorium (1927), San Gabriel, California

The Mission Revival style was part of an architectural movement, beginning in the late 19th century, for the revival and reinterpretation of American colonial styles. Mission Revival drew inspiration from the late 18th and early 19th century Spanish missions in California. It is sometimes termed California Mission Revival, particularly when used elsewhere, such as in New Mexico and Texas which have their own unique regional architectural styles. In Australia, the style is known as Spanish Mission.

The Mission Revival movement was most popular between 1890 and 1915, in numerous residential, commercial and institutional structures, particularly schools and railroad depots.

== Influences ==
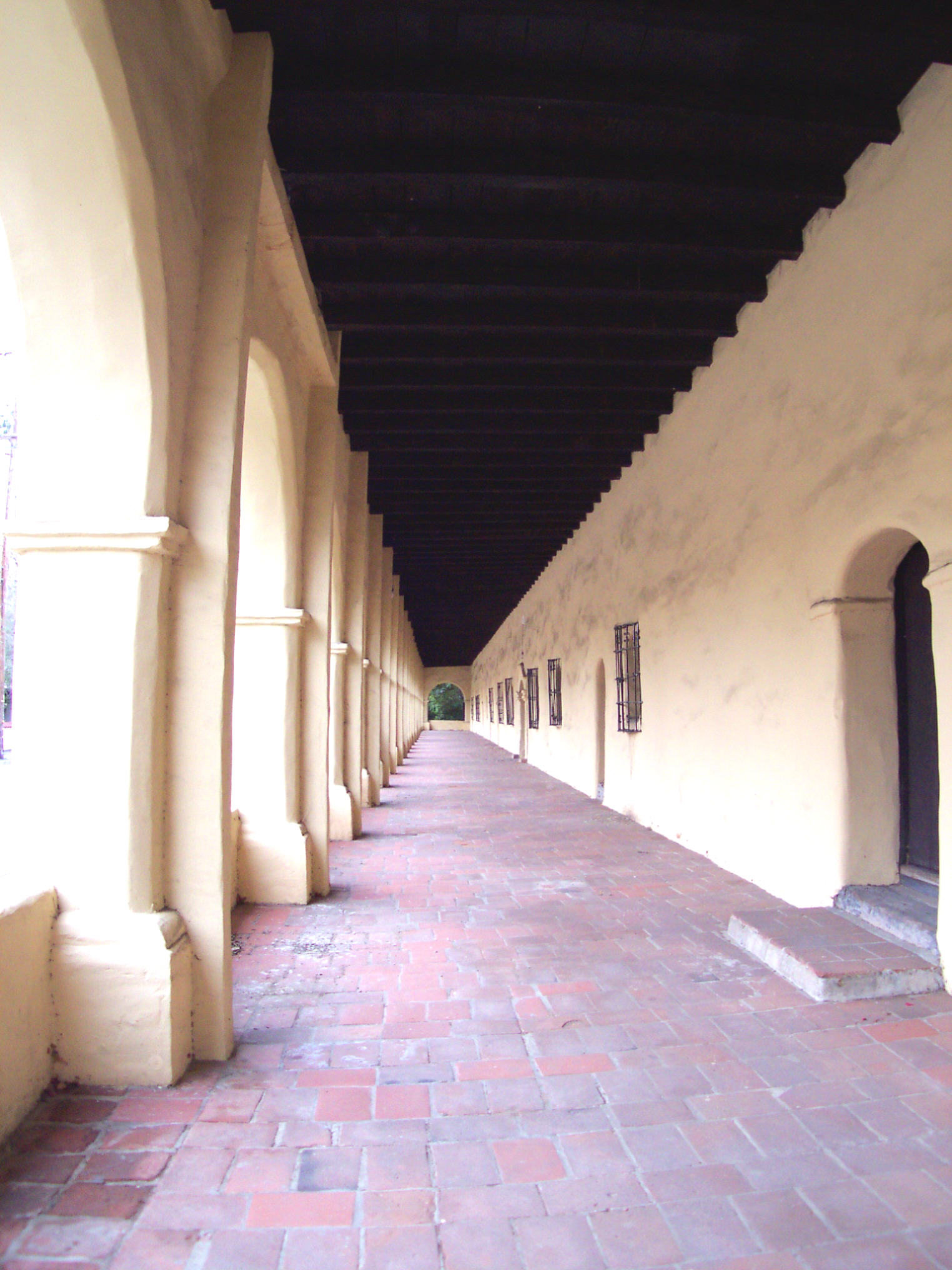
1797 Mission San Fernando Rey de España: View looking down an exterior arcade or corredor, an element frequently used in Mission Revival design.

All of the 21 Franciscan Alta California missions (established 1769–1823), including their chapels and support structures, shared certain design characteristics. These commonalities arose because the Franciscan missionaries all came from the same places of previous service in Spain and colonial Mexico City in New Spain. The New Spain religious buildings, the founding Franciscan saw and emulated were of the Spanish Colonial style, which in turn was derived from Renaissance and Baroque examples in Spain. Also, the limited availability and variety of building materials besides adobe near mission sites or imported to Alta California limited design options. Finally, the missionaries and the indigenous Californians had minimal construction skills and experience with European designs.

== Characteristics ==
=== Originals ===
The missions' style of necessity and security evolved around an enclosed courtyard, using massive adobe walls with broad unadorned plaster surfaces, limited fenestration and door piercing, low-pitched roofs with projecting wide eaves and non-flammable clay roof tiles, and thick arches springing from piers. Exterior walls were coated with white plaster (stucco), which with wide side eaves shielded the adobe brick walls from rain. Other features included long exterior arcades, an enfilade of interior rooms and halls, semi-independent bell-gables, and at more prosperous missions curved 'Baroque' gables on the principal facade with towers.

=== Revival ===
These architectural elements were replicated, in varying degrees, accuracy, and proportions, in the new Mission Revival structures. Simultaneous with the original style's revival was an awareness in California of the actual missions fading into ruins and their restoration campaigns, and nostalgia in the quickly changing state for a 'simpler time' as the novel Ramona popularized at the time. Contemporary construction materials and practices, earthquake codes, and building uses render the structural and religious architectural components primarily aesthetic decoration, while the service elements, such as tile roofing, solar shielding of walls and interiors, and outdoor shade arcades and courtyards, are still functional.

The Mission Revival style of architecture, and subsequent Spanish Colonial Revival style, have historical, narrative—nostalgic, cultural—environmental associations, and climate appropriateness that have made for a predominant historical regional vernacular architecture style in the Southwestern United States, especially in California.

== Examples ==
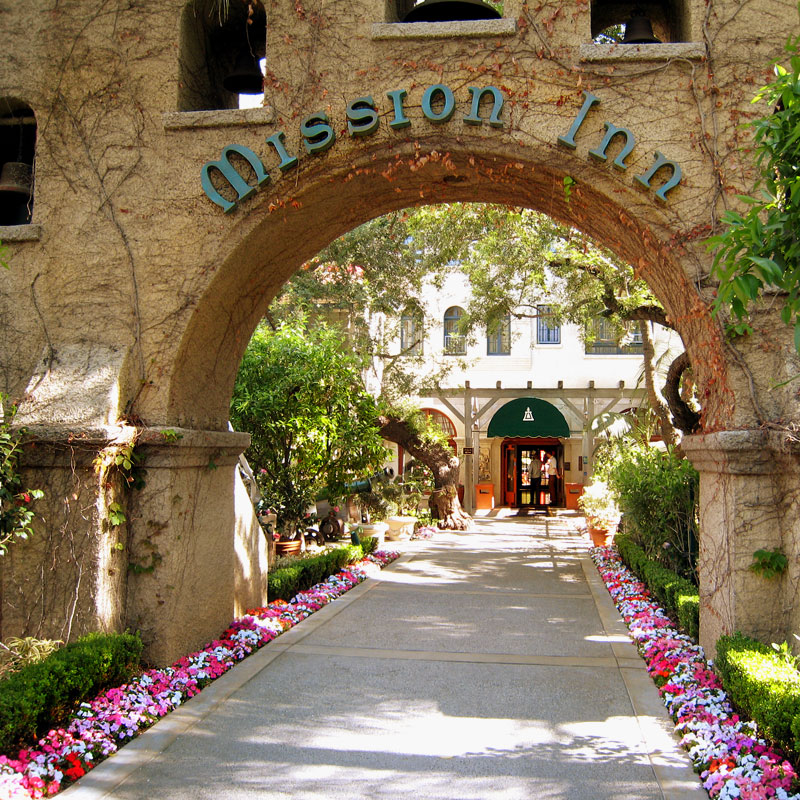
The Mission Inn entry portal, in Riverside, California

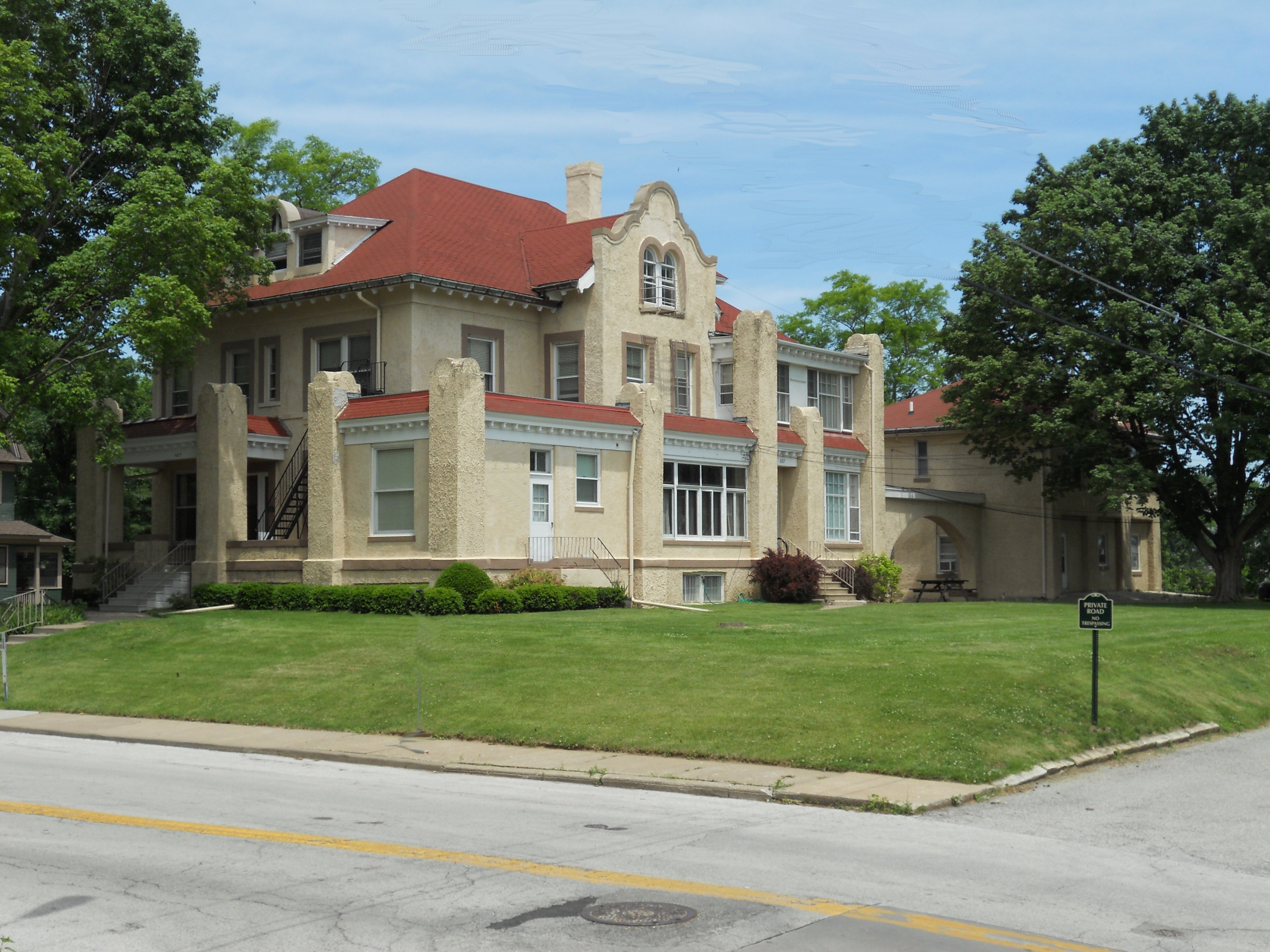
1909 The Louis P. and Clara K. Best Residence and Auto House, Davenport, Iowa

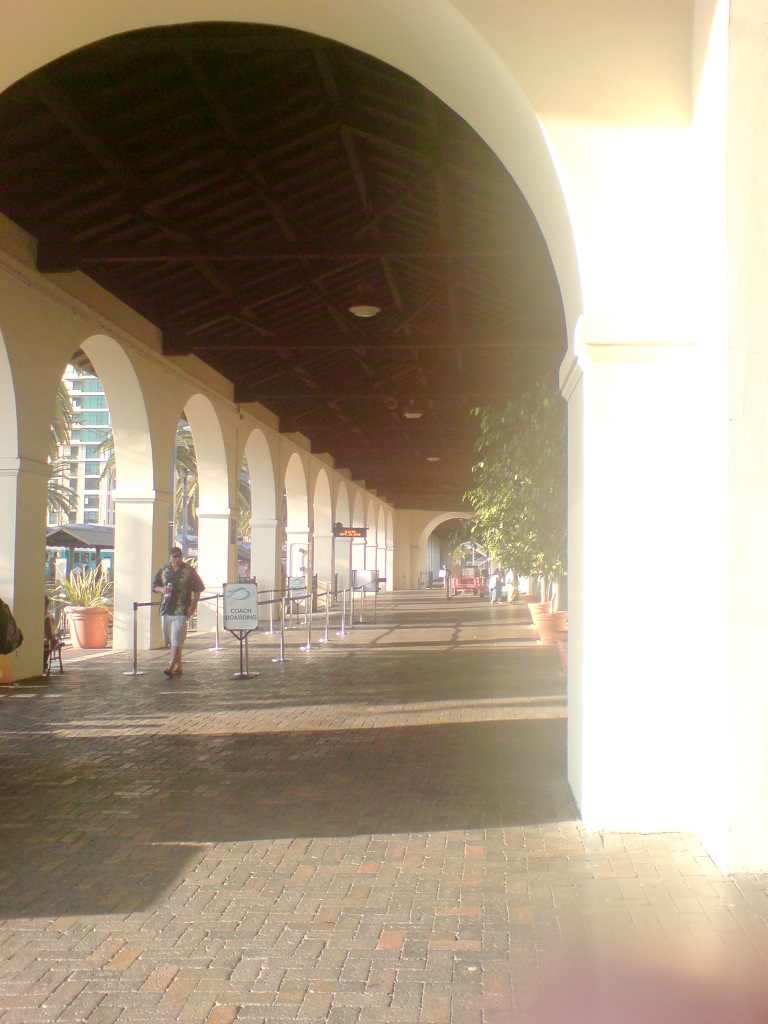
Arcade at Santa Fe Depot, in San Diego, California

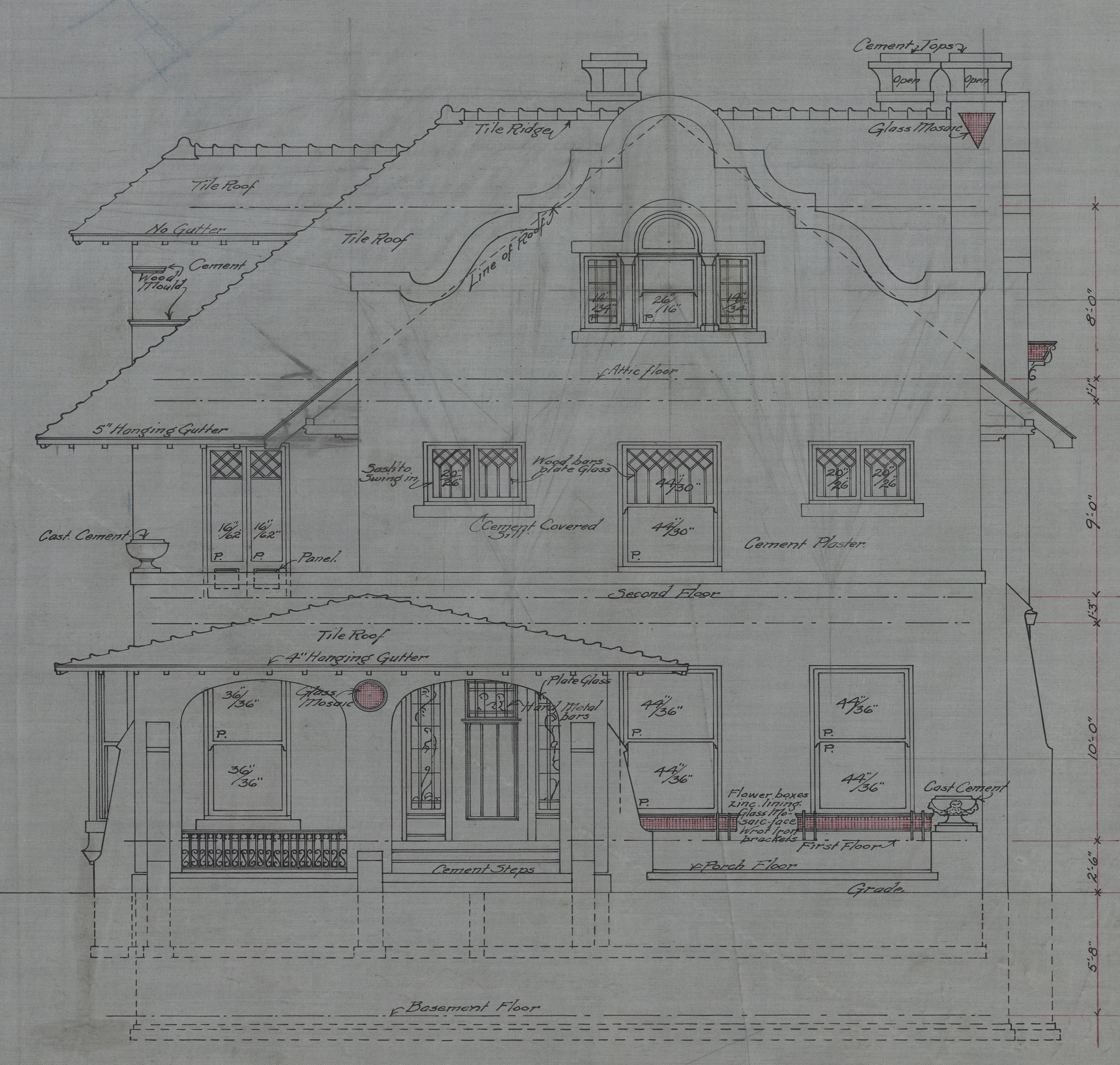
The William Morrison House, in Toledo, Ohio, designed in the Mission Revival style in 1906

The Mission Inn in Southern California is one of the largest extant Mission Revival Style buildings in the United States. Located in Riverside, it has been restored, with tours of the style's expression.

Other structures designed in the Mission Revival Style include:

- Castañeda Hotel, a Harvey House in Las Vegas, New Mexico, opened January 1, 1899. The first Mission Revival style building in New Mexico, architects Frederick Roehrig and A. Reinsch.
- Santa Fe Depot, Las Vegas, New Mexico, completed in 1899.
- Alvarado Hotel and Santa Fe Depot in Albuquerque, New Mexico, completed in 1902; Charles Frederick Whittlesey, architect. The hotel was demolished in 1970 and the depot burned down in 1993. The buildings have since been replaced by the Alvarado Transportation Center, which is also in Mission style.
- Arrowhead Springs Resort & Hotel, in San Bernardino Mountains, Southern California; (1939), (mission moderne), architect Paul Williams, interiors Dorothy Draper.
- Brophy College Preparatory in Phoenix, Arizona
- Ponce De Leon Hotel in St. Petersburg, Florida, completed in 1922
- Caliente Railroad Depot, in Caliente, Nevada, completed in 1923
- The Mary Louis Academy Chapel in Jamaica Estates, New York, completed in 1937
- California Baptist University, in Riverside, California, original school buildings built for Neighbors of Woodcraft, completed in 1921
- Davis Amtrak station, in Davis, California, completed in 1914
- Elizabeth Bard Memorial Hospital, in Downtown Ventura, California, completed in 1902.
- Four Roses Distillery, in Lawrenceburg, Kentucky. built in 1910.
- Francis Lederer estate and residence, in West Hills, Los Angeles, completed 1936
- Iao Theater, in Wailuku, Maui—Hawaii, built in 1928.
- Kelso Depot, in Mojave Desert—Mojave National Preserve, California, completed in 1923 for Union Pacific Railroad.
- Los Angeles Herald-Examiner Building; Julia Morgan, Downtown Los Angeles, 1915
- Los Angeles Union Station, which combines Art Deco, Mission Revival, and Streamline Moderne styles
- Mission Inn, in Riverside, California, completed in 1932
- Santa Fe Railway Depot in San Juan Capistrano, California, completed in 1894
- San Gabriel Mission Playhouse, in San Gabriel, California, completed in 1927
- Southern Pacific Railroad depot in Burlingame, California, completed in 1894
- Santa Clara University, in Santa Clara, California
- Stanford University, main quad, in Stanford, California, Shepley, Rutan and Coolidge; completed in 1891
- Texas A&M University–Kingsville, in Kingsville, Texas, founded in 1925 with new construction reflecting the Mission Revival style.
- Santa Fe Depot, in San Diego, California, completed in 1915.
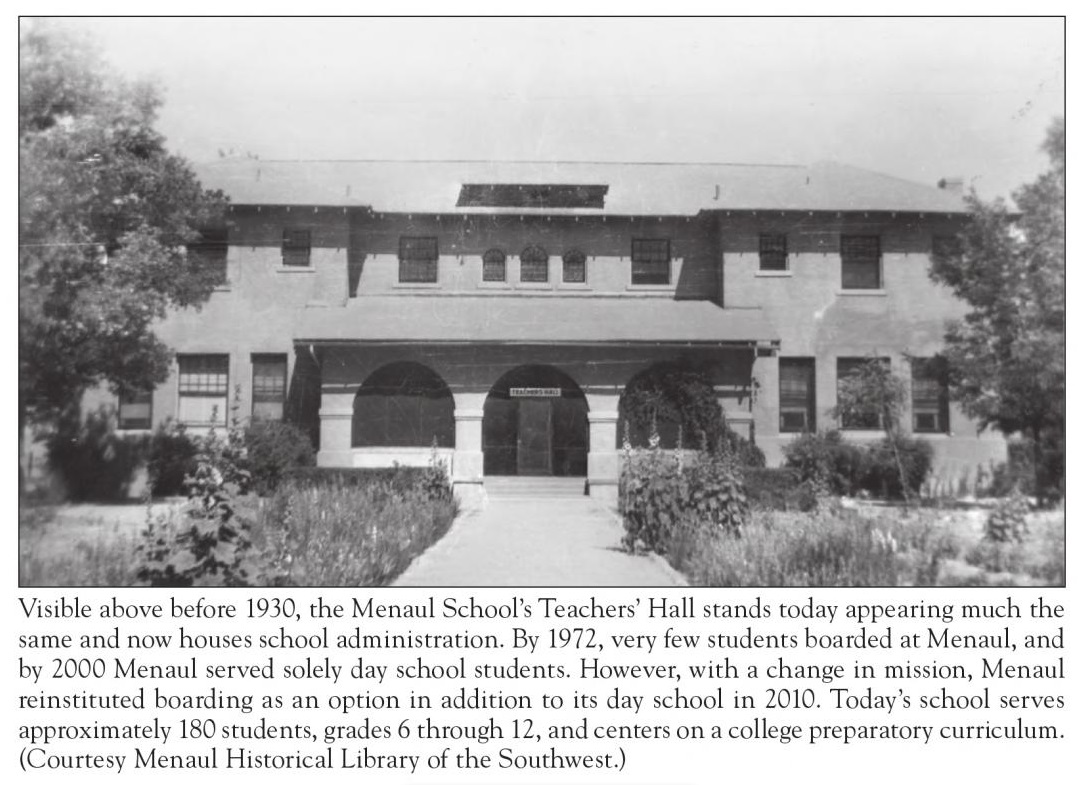
- Teacher's Hall at Menaul School, built in 1921
  Valdosta State University's Main Campus in Valdosta, Georgia
- Villa Rockledge, in Laguna Beach, California, completed in 1935
- Louis P. and Clara K. Best Residence and Auto House, Clausen & Clausen, Davenport, Iowa, constructed 1909–1910.
- Several buildings at Montclair State University in Montclair, New Jersey, the first being College Hall, constructed in 1908.
- Several buildings at Queens College in Queens, New York, including the main administration building, Jefferson Hall, constructed in 1907.
- Several buildings at Menaul School in Albuquerque, New Mexico, including Old Brick, Donaldson Hall, Bennett Hall, and Teacher's Hall, all constructed between 1890 and 1924.
- Eleven railroad stations built from 1926 to 1929 by architect Arthur Gerber in an adoptation referred to as "Insull Spanish" in the Chicago suburbs and two in Northwest Indiana. The Beverly Shores, Indiana station has been restored and is the best example.
- The Main Building at Auckland Grammar School in Auckland, New Zealand, built in 1916, was designed by Auckland architects Arnold and Abbott in the Spanish Mission style, inspired by their travels in California
- St. Mark's Episcopal Church, Berkeley, California, designed by William Curlett, built 1902, among the first buildings built in the Mission Revival style in California.
- Many Catholic churches in the southwestern United States also employ elements of this style.
- St. Charles Borromeo in Visalia, completed in 2023, is built in the Mission Revival style. It is the largest Catholic parish church in North America.
- Home of Addy and Domingo Ghirardelli Jr. at 632 Highland Ave. in Piedmont, CA. Designed by Albert Fahr and built by the Milwain Brothers in 1909.

== See also ==
- Spanish Colonial architecture
- Spanish Colonial Revival architecture
- Mediterranean Revival architecture
- Irving Gill
- Pueblo Revival architecture
- Ranchos of California
- Mar del Plata style – eclectic vernacular architecture from Argentina featuring some Mission Revival characteristics
