= Rollin V. Ankeny =

Rollin Valentine Ankeny (May 22, 1830 – December 24, 1901) was an American soldier from Pennsylvania. Raised in Ohio, Ankeny came to Freeport, Illinois, as an adult to farm. Upon the outbreak of the Civil War, Ankeny raised eight companies of volunteers before fighting with the 46th Illinois Volunteer Infantry Regiment. Twice wounded, Ankeny was lauded by his superiors for his topographical maps of battlegrounds and was brevetted a brigadier general. After the war, Ankeny returned to Freeport before purchasing a large farm north of Des Moines, Iowa.

== Biography ==
Rollin Valentine Ankeny was born in Somerset, Pennsylvania, on May 22, 1830. Shortly after his birth, his parents moved the family to Millersburg, Ohio. Ankeny grew up on the family farm and also worked in his father's store. He attended public schools, then moved to Freeport, Illinois in 1854. When the Civil War broke out in 1861, Ankeny helped to raise Company A of the 11th Illinois Volunteer Infantry Regiment and transferred it to Smith D. Atkins. Ankeny then helped to raise seven companies of troops for the next call for volunteers.

Ankeny was named first lieutenant of Company B, 46th Illinois Volunteer Infantry Regiment. He fought with the regiment, was wounded at the Battle of Fort Donelson and the Battle of Shiloh. He was named captain of Company B in 1863. His superiors utilized his skills in drawing topographical maps of battlegrounds. When the 142nd Illinois Volunteer Infantry Regiment was raised in June 1864, Ankeny was named its colonel. When the war ended, Ankeny was brevetted a brigadier general. After the war, Ankeny returned to Freeport and continued to farm until 1868. He then moved to Des Moines, Iowa, where he purchased a 640-acre (260 ha) plot of land north of the city. He moved to Winterset, Iowa after the Chicago, Rock Island and Pacific Railroad connected to the city and traded in lumber. While there, he was named a deputy United States Marshal. He returned to Des Moines in 1882 but was forced to retire soon after following an injury sustained in a train wreck. After a failed enterprise in the Black Hills of South Dakota, he took a job with the United States Department of the Interior. He retired and returned to Des Moines.

Ankeny married Sarah Irvine on August 9, 1851. They had four children: Irvina, Harriet, Rollin, and Mary. Ankeny was a Mason—a member of the Des Moines Commandery—and attended the Christian Church. He was also a founding member of the first lodge of the Knights of Pythias and post of the Grand Army of the Republic in Des Moines. He died from pneumonia in Des Moines on December 24, 1901, he is interred there in Woodland Cemetery.
