= Hotel Green =

- U.S. National Register of Historic Places
- U.S. Historic district – Contributing property
- City of Pasadena’s list of Historic Places
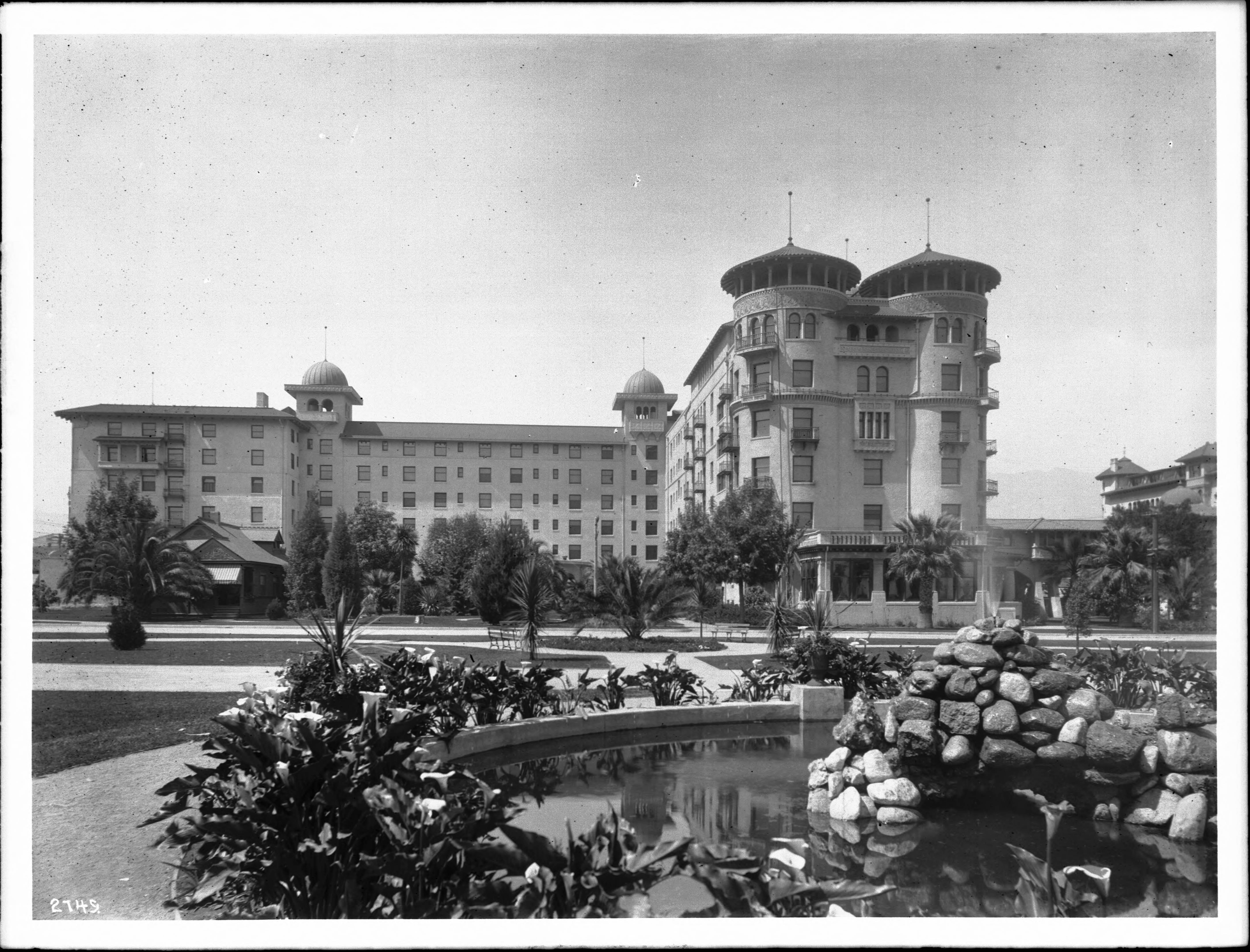
- Hotel Green, circa 1905

- Location within California
- Location: Pasadena, California
- Coordinates: 34°08′38″N 118°08′58″W
- Built: 1893
- Architect: Frederick L. Roehrig
- Architectural style: Mediterranean Revival
- NRHP reference No.: 82002196
- PASHP No.: N1062

Significant dates
- Added to NRHP: March 23, 1982
- Designated CP: September 15, 1983
- Designated PASHP: March 23, 1982

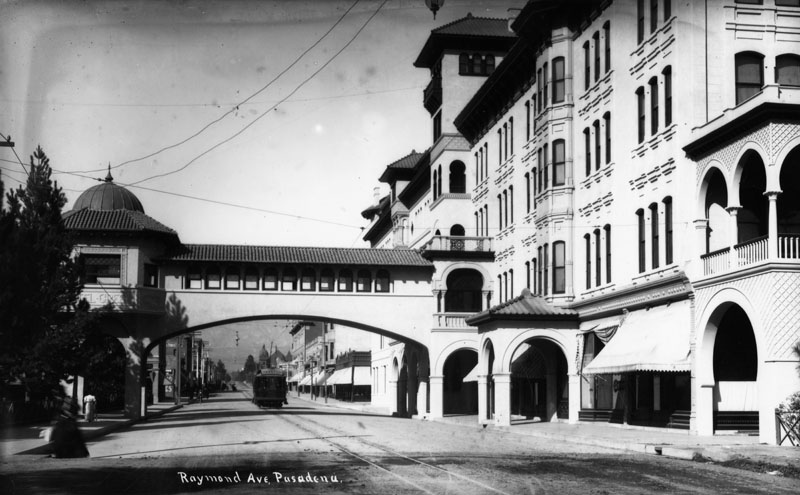
Hotel Green, 1900.

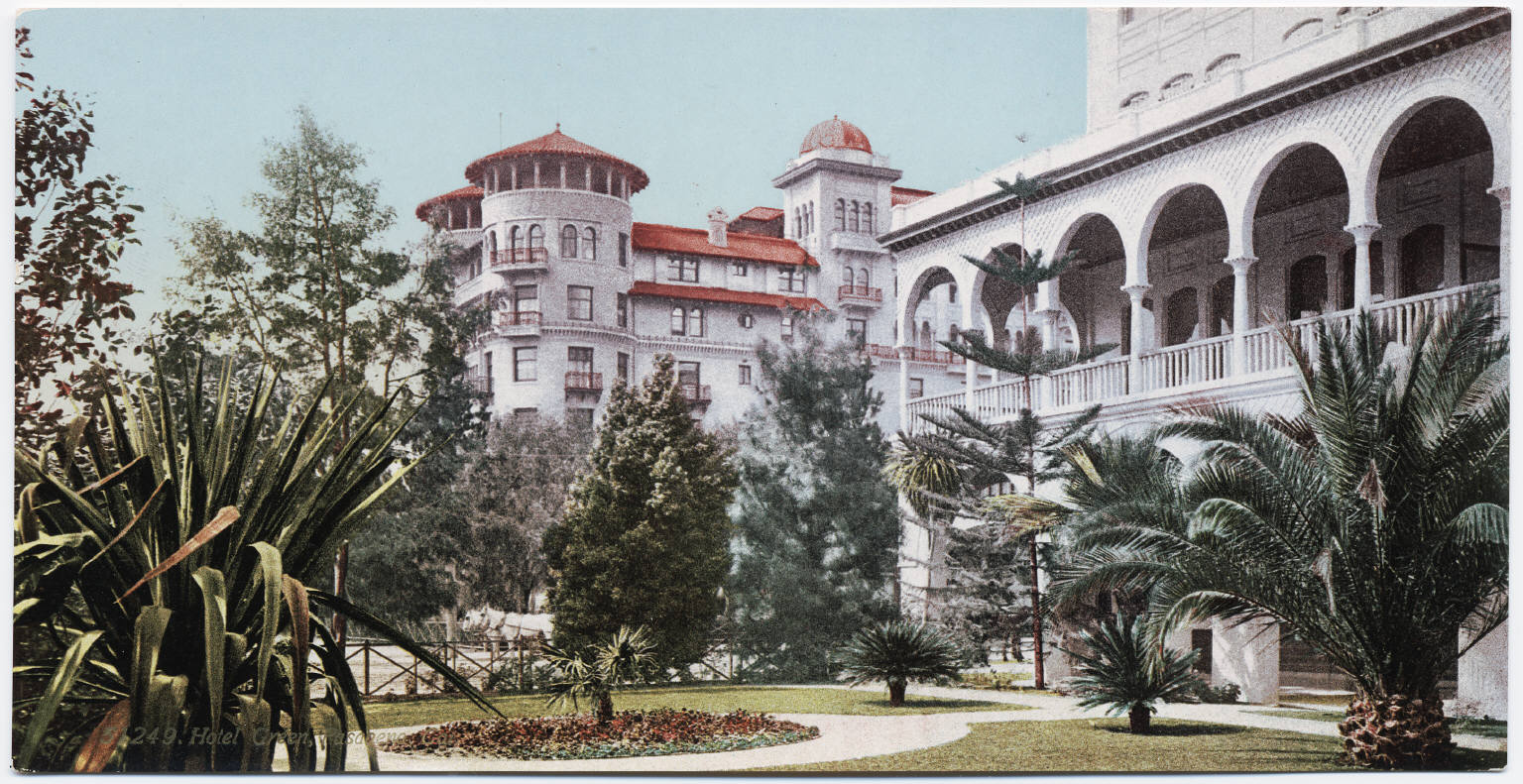

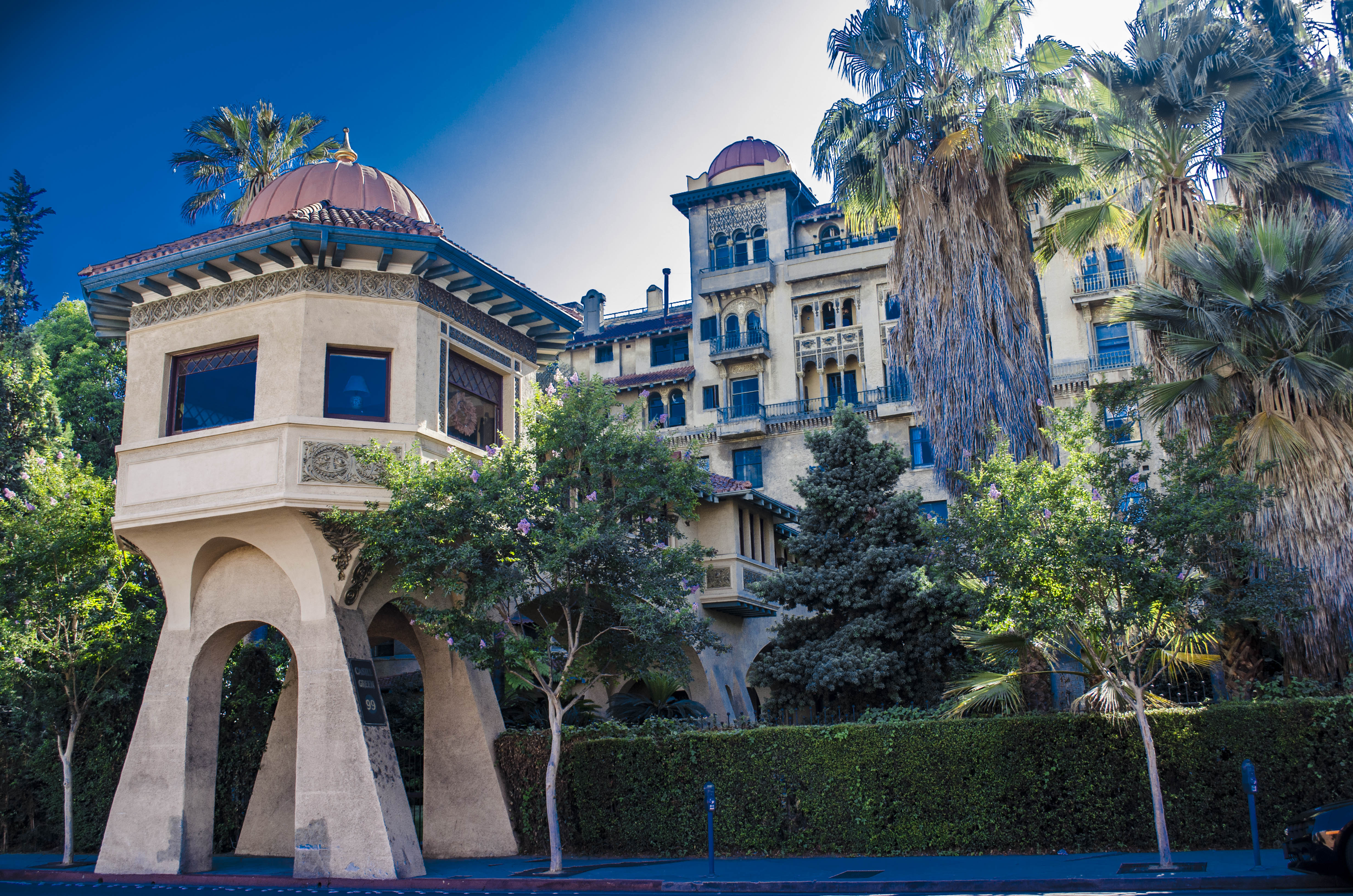
Hotel Green, circa 2022

The Hotel Green, also known as Castle Green, was a hotel in Pasadena, California. It was built in 1893 by George Gill Green, and later expanded by him with two additional buildings in 1898 and 1903, creating a complex of three structures. The Hotel Green was the home of the Valley Hunt Club and the Tournament of Roses association.

Hotel Green, designed by Los Angeles-based architect Frederick Roehrig in 1893, was the first of the three buildings. The second building in the complex was originally known as the "Central Annex" and became known as "Castle Green," while the third building is known as the "North Annex." The entire block of annexes is listed on the National Register of Historic Places and is a Pasadena Historic Monument.

== History ==
Construction on a hotel was initiated in 1887 by developer Edward C. Webster, between Raymond Avenue and the Santa Fe Railroad tracks. Webster's later insolvency led to George Gill Green acquiring the unfinished building. Green doubled the size and completed the hotel in 1893. The newly expanded hotel, named the Hotel Green, opened for business in 1894. During its time, the Hotel Green became a "social and cultural center for Pasadena," where it hosted society events such as receptions for significant visitors, and painting exhibitions. Due to the hotel's success, Green began building an addition in 1897, and the "Central Annex" opened on January 16, 1899, to coincide with Green's birthday, and 1,000 guests came to celebrate the occasion. The new building, to become known as "Castle Green," was on a full city block but was "set back from the streets, which provided ample space for a garden."

The hotel continued to grow in popularity with the new Central Annex. Its pedestrian bridge to the main hotel over Raymond Avenue became a popular viewing site for the Rose Parade, which ran along Raymond at the time. In 1903 Green added a third building. It incorporated an earlier building constructed in 1887, the Wooster Block, which had been part of the original site of the California Institute of Technology.

The original 1893 Hotel Green building was demolished in 1935. Castle Green is currently condominium residences. The North Annex is currently affordable housing for seniors.

== In film ==
- Puppet Master - the Green Hotel was filmed to double as the "Bodega Bay Inn"
- Rumor Has It
- The Little Rascals
- The Sting
