= Ramsay-Durfee Estate =

Historic house in California, United States

- Ramsay--Durfee Estate
- U.S. National Register of Historic Places
- Los Angeles Historic-Cultural Monument
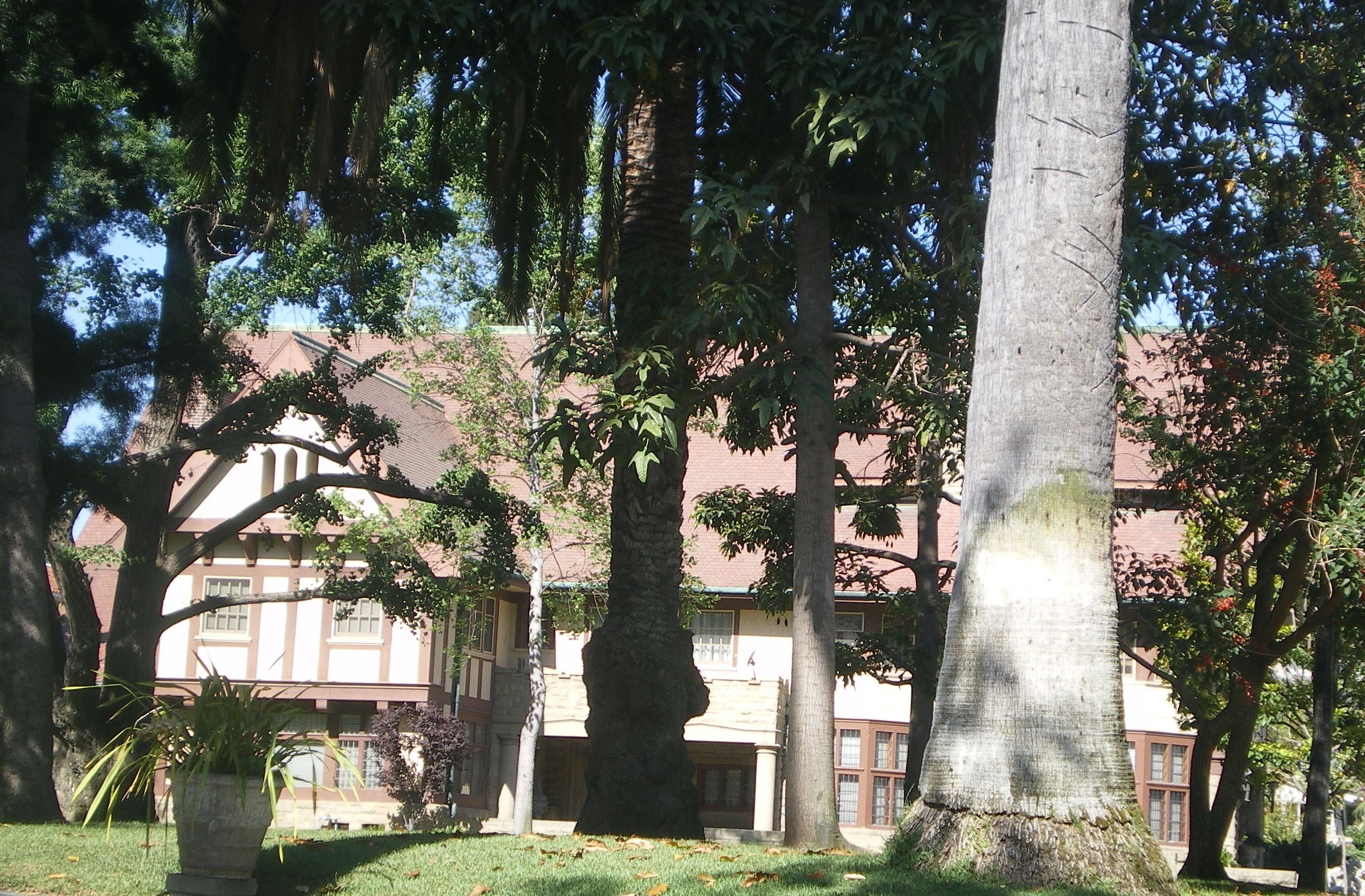
- Ramsay-Durfee Estate, 2008

- Location within the Los Angeles metropolitan area Location within California Location within the United States
- Location: 2425 S. Western Ave., West Adams, Los Angeles
- Coordinates: 34°2′0″N 118°18′34″W
- Built: 1908
- Architect: Frederick Louis Roehrig
- Architectural style: Tudor Revival
- NRHP reference No.: 89000821
- LAHCM No.: 230

Significant dates
- Added to NRHP: July 24, 1989
- Designated LAHCM: June 12, 1980

The Ramsay-Durfee Estate, also known as Durfee Mansion, Durfee House or Villa Maria, is a historic Tudor Revival style mansion in the West Adams Terrace neighborhood of Los Angeles. It has been designated a Los Angeles Historic-Cultural Monument and listed on the National Register of Historic Places.

== Architecture ==
Completed in 1908, the three-story, 42-room mansion was designed by Frederick Louis Roehrig. Roehrig also planned the landscape gardens and layout of the grounds. The mansion is located on a 2.8-acre (1.1 ha) site that also includes a formal garden and carriage house with chauffeur's quarters. When the house was completed, the Los Angeles Times published a full-page article accompanied by numerous photographs. The Times called it "among the finest homes in Los Angeles" and one of architect Roehrig's "best efforts." The Times described the exterior of the mansion as follows:

The house is distinctly of the typical English domestic architecture. The exterior is of stone and half timber and plaster finish, while the roof is of slate. It is probably the finest example of the purely English type of dwelling in this city.

The Times also made note of the grand staircase describing it as "the stair builder's art in mahogany" lit by a large group of art glass windows. The third floor was almost entirely taken up by a 25-foot (7.6 m) by 99-foot (30 m) ballroom with a large brick fireplace and an open truss and exposed beam ceilings.

== History ==
The house was built for a wealthy lumberman, William E. Ramsay, who died in 1909—shortly after the mansion was completed. His widow continued to live in the mansion until her death in 1916. In 1913 the house was featured across six pages in Homes and Gardens of the Pacific Coast Volume II, a picture book of Los Angeles mansions describing it as a "beautiful home of the English style of domestic architecture, designed by Mr. F. L. Roehrig ..."

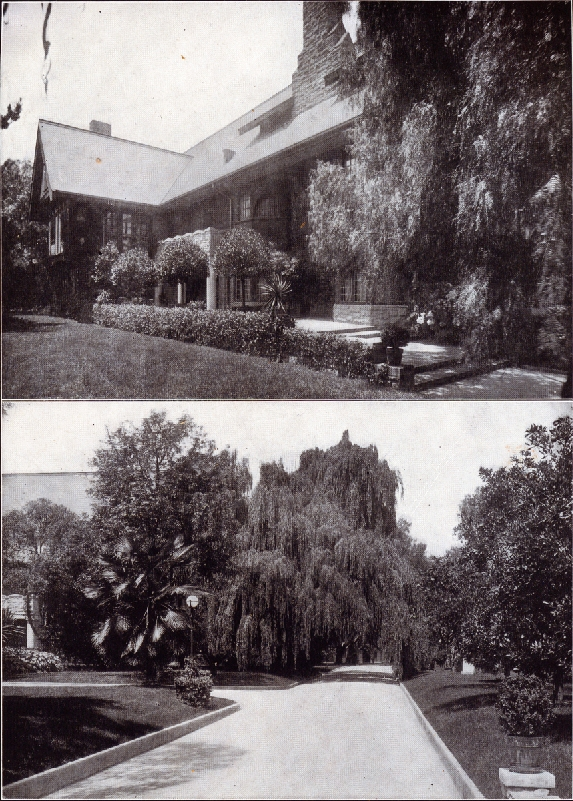
Estate in 1913 showing the house and entry drive

In the early 1920s, the property was purchased for the unheard of price of $105,000 by William G. and Nellie McGaughey Durfee. Mr. Durfee was a horse-racing devotee, and Mrs. Durfee was the sheltered daughter of a Figueroa Street millionaire. Their marriage had been a scandal reported on in the newspapers, as Mr. Durfee had divorced the mother of his two children in 1910 and married Nellie in 1911. During the 1920s, the house was a gathering place for the motion picture business, and its grand staircase and ornately paneled rooms were popular filming locations. Mr. Durfee died in 1927, reportedly from food poisoning while on a fishing trip in the Pacific Northwest. Nellie remained at the house until her death in 1976, reportedly living as a recluse. Columnist Jack Smith toured the Durfee residence in 1976 and found the house virtually unchanged from the time of Mr. Durfee's death 50 years earlier. Though Mr. Durfee had died during Prohibition, the wine cellar remained untouched and full of vintage wines dating to the 1890s and 1900s as well as 183 bottles of vintage whisky. Mr. Durfee's wide-brimmed felt hats and tweed suits were still hanging in his closet. Smith noted that Mrs. Durfee died at age 99, "wasted and blind," in an upstairs bedroom -- "alone with her companion-housekeeper, her cat, her ostrich feathers, her unopened boxes of silk stockings, her sculptures and paintings and Oriental rugs."

In 1978, the Brothers of St. John of God bought the property from the Estate of Nellie Durfee for $470,000. The brothers are a Catholic religious order that operated 260 hospitals, which purchased the property to serve as its western headquarters. In 1982, the house was opened to the public for the first time in its history for a benefit dinner to support KUSC radio.

== Historic designation ==
In 1980 city's Cultural Heritage Commission designated the property, under the name "Villa Maria", as a Los Angeles Historic-Cultural Monument, calling it, "a distinguished example of Tudor Revival architecture of the early 20th Century." It was also listed on the National Register of Historic Places in 1989.

== See also ==
- List of Registered Historic Places in Los Angeles
- List of Los Angeles Historic-Cultural Monuments in South Los Angeles
