= Louis P. and Clara K. Best Residence and Auto House =

Historic house in Iowa, United States

- U.S. National Register of Historic Places
- U.S. Historic district – Contributing property
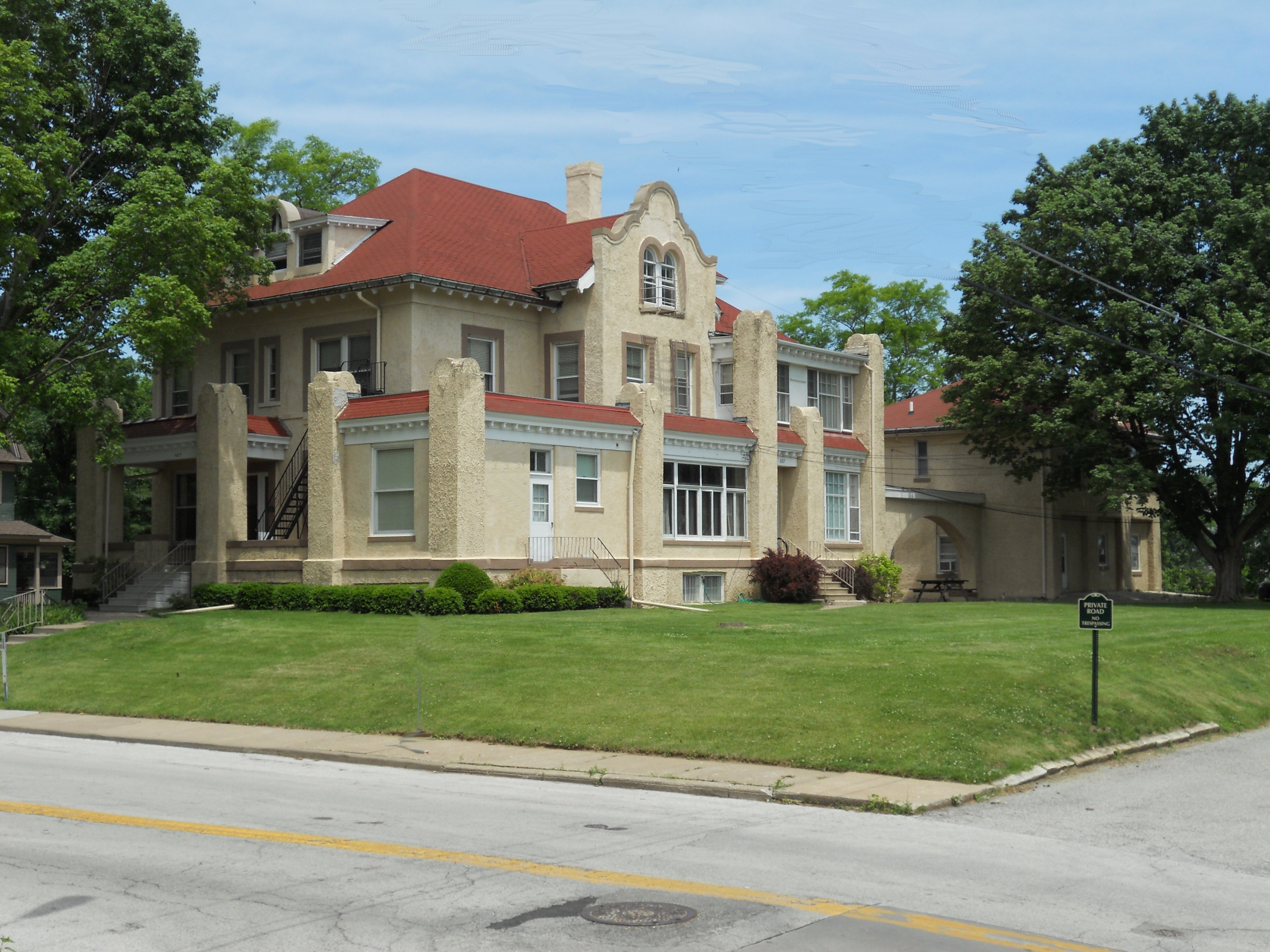
- The Best Residence June 2011

- Location within Iowa Location within the United States
- Location: 627 Ripley St. Davenport, Iowa
- Coordinates: 41°31′34.62″N 90°34′42.38″W
- Area: 1 acre (0.40 ha)
- Built: 1910
- Built by: Concrete Engineering Co.; Jake Sievers
- Architect: Clausen & Clausen
- Architectural style: Mission/Spanish Revival
- Part of: Hamburg Historic District (ID83003656)
- NRHP reference No.: 10000296
- Added to NRHP: May 28, 2010

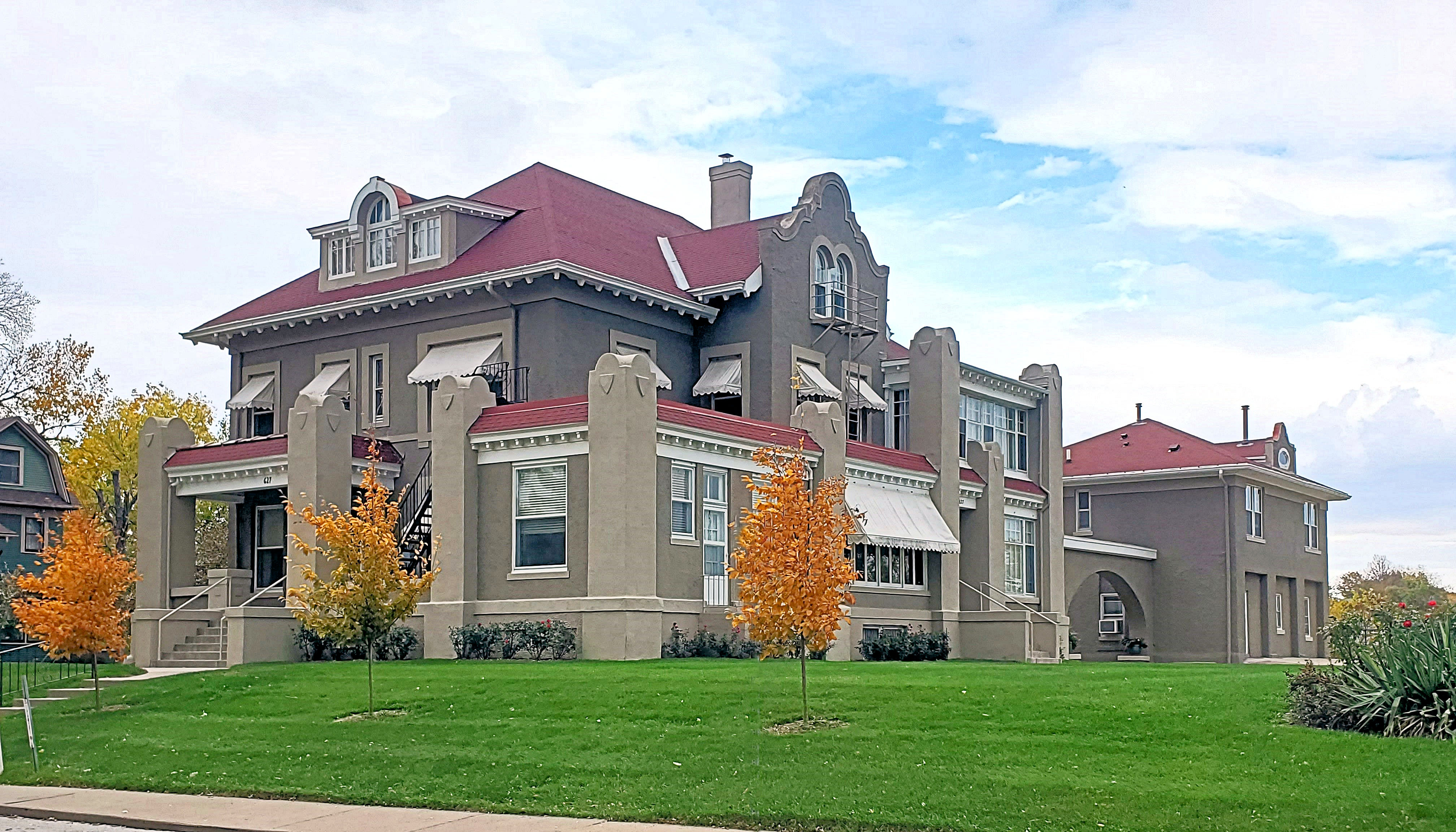
Louis P. & Clara K. Best Residence and Auto House

The Louis P. and Clara K. Best Residence and Auto House, also known as Grandview Apartments and The Alamo, is a historic building located in the central part of Davenport, Iowa, United States. It was included as a contributing property in the Hamburg Historic District in 1983, and it was individually listed on the National Register of Historic Places in 2010.

== Louis P. and Clara K. Best ==
Louis P. Best was born in 1848 in present-day Osthofen, Germany, and was educated in Stuttgart and Berlin. He came to the United States in 1869 and worked as a chemist in New York City. He moved to Davenport in 1874 to work for the Davenport Glucose Manufacturing Company. He eventually bought stock in the company to the point that he became one of their chief stockholders and became involved in the management of the company. He also had other business interests in the city including Davenport Machinery & Foundry Company, of which he was president, the Bettendorf Axle Company, Hawkeye Electric Company, and Citizens National Bank. He later founded a glucose factory in Granite City, Illinois, and in 1908 built the Best Building in Rock Island, Illinois for a department store for which he served as one of the directors. In addition to his business interests, he was a member of the local school board. There is also a local legend that Best invented the process that is used to make Argo cornstarch.

Best was married twice, first to Louise Heck in London in 1871. They had a son named Rudolph. Louise died around 1896. He married Clara Krause in 1899 and they had a son Louis and a daughter Margaret (Gretchen). Clara was a businesswoman in her own right. Her father was a pioneer settler in Davenport and he established a clothing manufacturing company that produced overalls. Clara was involved in the management of the company and served as its treasurer for several years. She died in 1922 and Louis died four years later.

After Louis died, the children had houses of their own in fashionable McClellan Heights and they did not want this house. In 1928 it was sold in a trade of farmland with Thomas Agar. He converted the house into apartments. After several owners, the property was acquired by Donald and Darlene Brus in 1987. They received a preservation award from the Scott County Historical Society for their restoration work.

== Architecture ==
The Best house was built on the former location of the Henry C. Struck, Jr. house, built 1896, which was relocated to the second lot to the north at 703 Ripley St. It is one of the few examples of Mission Revival architecture in Davenport, and it is also one the first "absolutely fireproof" houses built in the Quad Cities. The house is constructed of hollow clay tiles covered with stucco. The flooring decks are composed of steel reinforced concrete joists with intermittent rows of hollow tile. The 2½-story structure features a steep hipped roof typical of an American Foursquare, projecting gabled pavilions with Mission Style curved parapets, a small front porch, and a single-story wing along south elevation. There is also a Palladian window in a Spanish-inspired roof dormer on the west elevation of the house. American Craftsman decorative details are found on the stylized cap detail of the front porch. Prairie School influences are found in the horizontality of the various porches, a projecting one-story window feature, and a two-story sunporch. The roof was originally covered with French-style red roof tiles that have been replaced with red asphalt shingles.

The residence is connected to the two-story "auto house," or garage, by way of a Roman arch that transports the steam heat from the basement of the house to the auto house. It is constructed of the same materials as the house. The main floor had three bays for automobiles, and the second floor had living space for the chauffeur. There is a roof dormer on the south elevation.

Both buildings were designed by the prominent Davenport architectural firm of Clausen & Clausen. It is believed that Rudolph Clausen was the designer of the house as he was the younger of the two architects and more familiar with the newer techniques of the day, including the "fireproof" construction methods and the combination of the Mission and Arts & Crafts styles. Concrete Engineering Company of Davenport did the concrete work, and Jake Sievers was the contractor.
