= Best Building =

- U.S. National Register of Historic Places
- U.S. Historic district – Contributing property
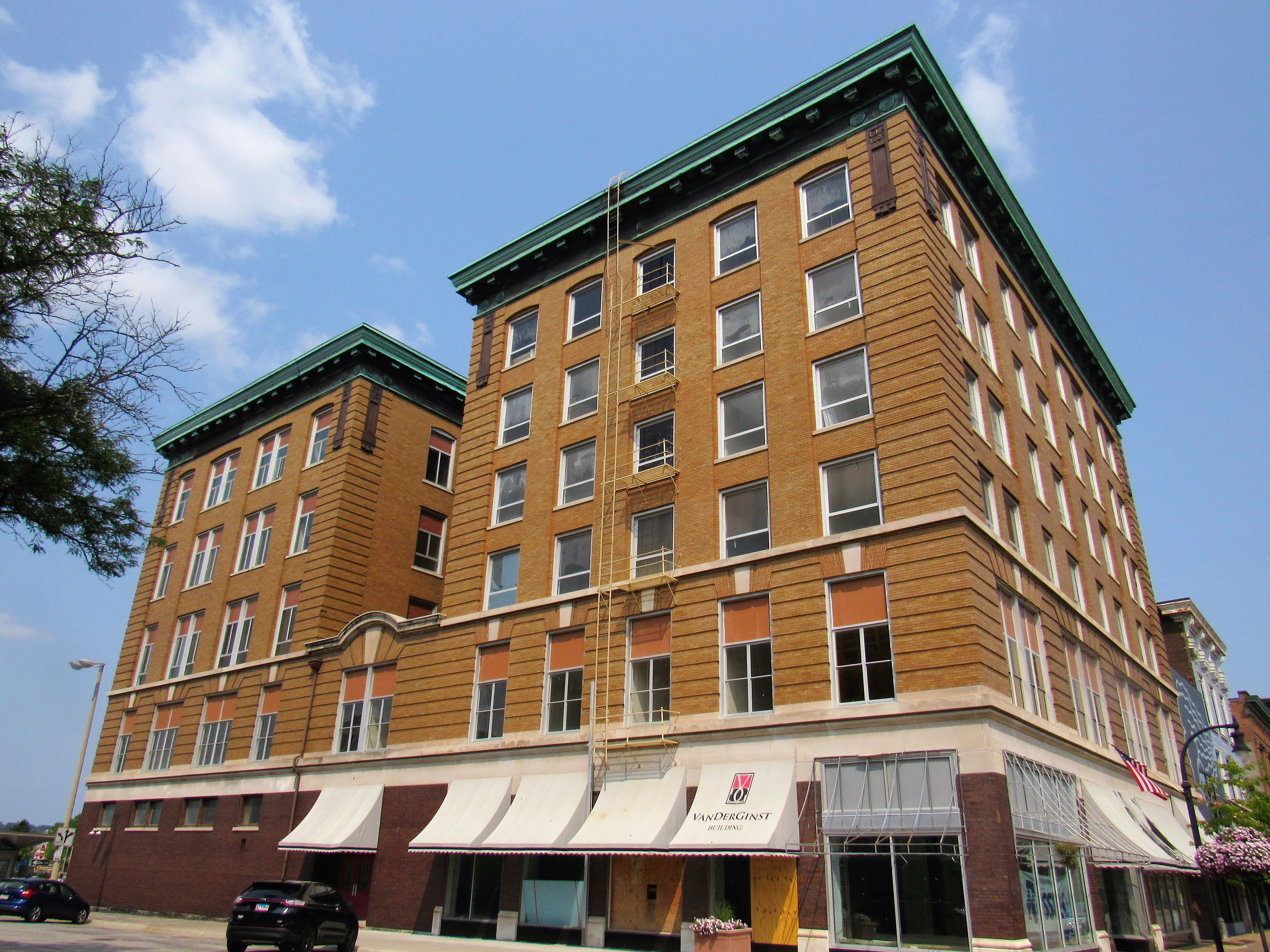
- The building in 2018

- Location within Illinois Location within the United States
- Location: 1701–1703 2nd Ave. Rock Island, Illinois
- Coordinates: 41°30′40″N 90°34′33″W
- Built: 1908
- Architect: Clausen & Clausen
- Architectural style: Renaissance Revival
- Part of: Downtown Rock Island Historic District (ID100004433)
- NRHP reference No.: 100002328
- Added to NRHP: July 17, 2018

The Best Building is a historic building located in downtown Rock Island, Illinois, United States. It was built by Louis Best, an industrialist and real estate magnate from Davenport, Iowa in 1908. It was designed by the prominent Davenport architectural firm of Clausen & Clausen in the Renaissance Revival style. The six-story structure is one of the first buildings in the city to be constructed with reinforced concrete. It also had an early form of air-conditioning that utilized a 10-ton ice machine in the basement. The building initially housed the Young & McCombs Department Store, of which Best served as a financier. It is thought that this was the first store outside of Chicago that had a pneumatic tube system for cash transactions. After Young & McCombs the building housed the Brady-Waxenberg Department Store followed by Montgomery Ward. It has subsequently been used as an office building.

In 1992 New York artist Richard Haas painted the north elevation of the building with a 60-foot (18 m) tall trompe-l'œil memorial sculpture of local Sauk warrior Black Hawk. The building was individually listed on the National Register of Historic Places in 2018. It was included as a contributing property in the Downtown Rock Island Historic District in 2020.

== See also ==
- Louis P. and Clara K. Best Residence and Auto House
