= Castañeda Hotel =

- U.S. Historic district – Contributing property
- NM State Register of Cultural Properties
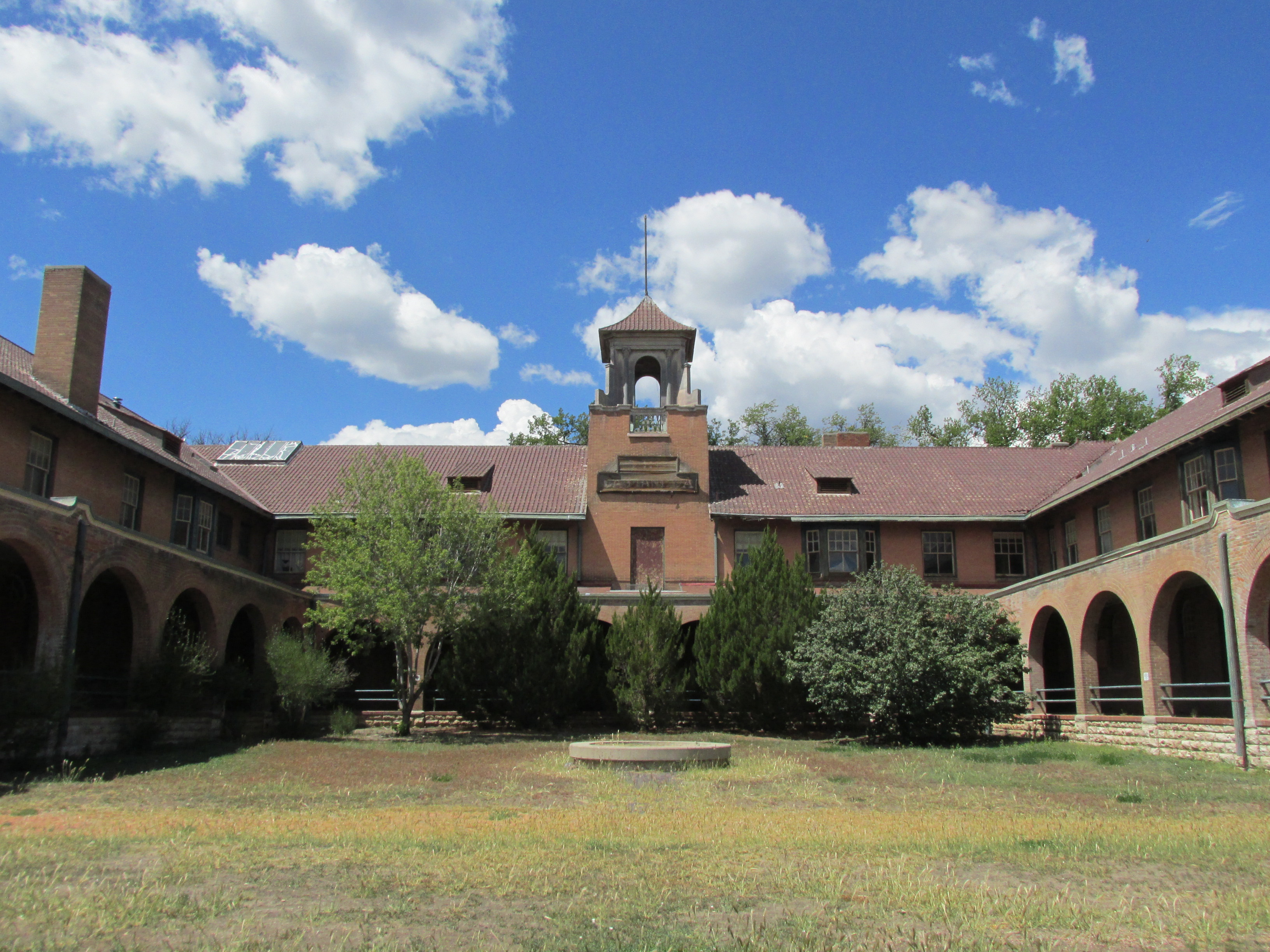
- The hotel in 2013

- Location within New Mexico Location within the United States
- Location: 541 Railroad Ave., Las Vegas, New Mexico
- Coordinates: 35°35′40″N 105°12′46″W
- Built: 1899
- Architect: Frederick Roehrig
- Architectural style: Mission Revival
- Part of: Railroad Avenue Historic District (Las Vegas, New Mexico) (ID79001551)
- NMSRCP No.: 307
- Designated NMSRCP: January 25, 1974

The Castañeda Hotel is a historic railroad hotel located in Las Vegas, New Mexico. It was built in 1898 and 1899 by the Atchison, Topeka and Santa Fe Railway, and was operated by the Fred Harvey Company until 1948. After being mostly vacant for many years, the hotel was restored and reopened in 2019. The Castañeda was listed on the New Mexico State Register of Cultural Properties in 1974 and the National Register of Historic Places in 1979 as a contributing property in the Railroad Avenue Historic District. It is located adjacent to the Las Vegas railroad station.

== History ==
In the 1890s, the Atchison, Topeka and Santa Fe Railway operated a small frame boarding house called the Depot Hotel where passengers could eat during lunch stops in Las Vegas. In 1898 and 1899, the railroad built a new and much larger hotel, the Castañeda, which was operated by the Fred Harvey Company. The Castañeda was the first of what would eventually be dozens of Harvey hotels along the Santa Fe lines, including the Alvarado in Albuquerque, New Mexico, El Tovar at the Grand Canyon, El Garces in Needles, California, and Casa del Desierto in Barstow, California, among others. The hotel was designed by Frederick Roehrig and officially opened on January 1, 1899. It was named after Pedro de Castañeda de Nájera, who chronicled the 1540 expedition of Francisco Vázquez de Coronado into New Mexico. The cost of construction was $110,000, plus another $30,000 for furnishings.

In June, 1899, the hotel hosted then-governor of New York Theodore Roosevelt at the first reunion of the Rough Riders. By the 1940s, apart from a brief boom in train travel during World War II, the hotel was losing money. It was closed by the railroad in June, 1948. The Las Vegas Optic wrote,

The Castaneda has been a center of social activity for the community. Its walls have resounded the oratory of locals and visitors at civic, political and fraternal banquet sessions. Evening-gowned ladies have brushed elbows with smoke-darkened railroaders. Cowboys have perched at the counter alongside eastern dandies. Politicians and salesmen have shared the lobby. Life won't seem the same with the Castaneda closed.

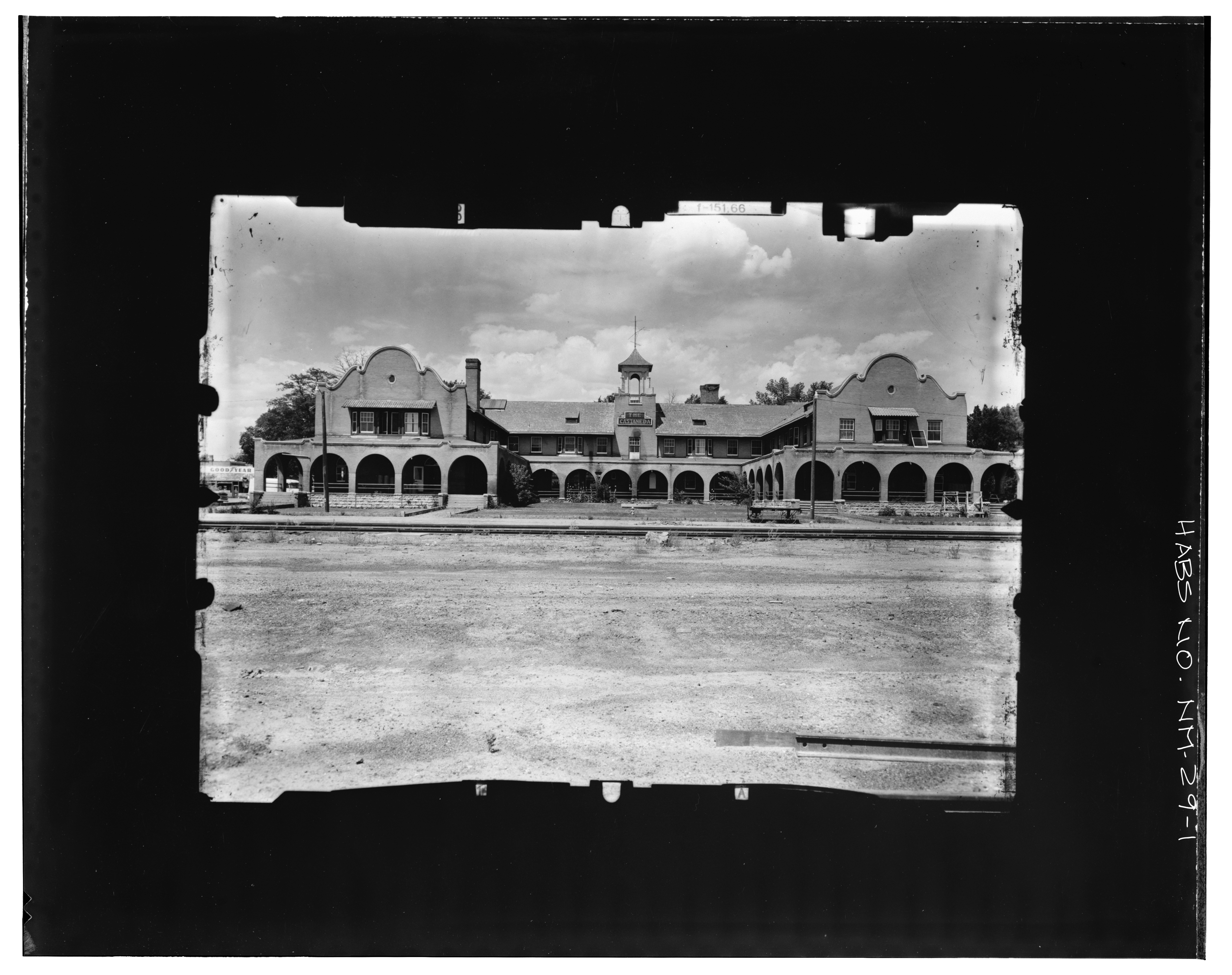
The hotel in 1976

The hotel remained mostly vacant for the next 70 years, but it was saved from demolition by a preservation-minded owner, unlike the Alvarado in Albuquerque. Some of the rooms were sporadically used as apartments, and the hotel bar remained in operation, but most of the building was empty and deteriorating. In 2014, it was purchased by Allan Affeldt, who had previously restored the La Posada Hotel in Winslow, Arizona. Affeldt spent three years and $6 million restoring the Castañeda and the nearby Plaza Hotel. The Castañeda reopened in 2019.

== Architecture ==
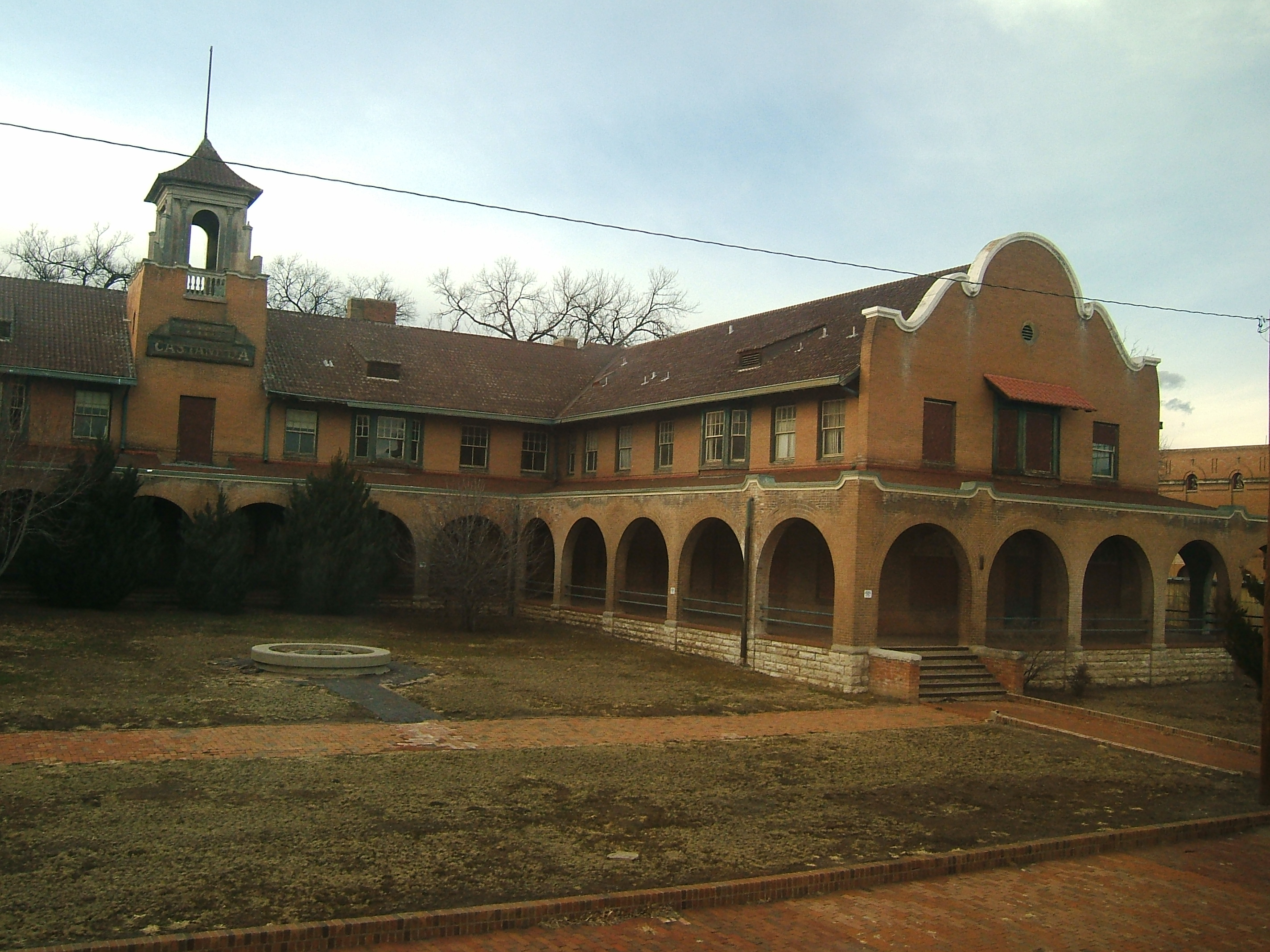
The north wing and courtyard in 2007

The Castañeda was designed by Pasadena architect Frederick Roehrig and was the first example of Mission Revival architecture in New Mexico, as well as the first Mission-style Harvey house. As such, it served as a prototype for later buildings constructed by the Santa Fe Railway, like the Alvarado Hotel. The Castañeda is a two-story, U-shaped brick building surrounding a central courtyard that opens onto the railroad tracks. A 500-foot (150 m) long arcade wraps around the front and sides of the hotel. The two side wings terminate in curved, Mission-style gables, and there is a tall bell tower above the main entrance.

The interior of the hotel contains about 30,000 square feet (2,800 m^{2}) of space plus a large, uninsulated attic space and partial basements under the north and south wings. The south basement contains mechanical equipment, while the north basement was used for storage. In its original configuration, the hotel's ground floor contained a 108-seat dining room, 50-seat lunch counter, and a newsstand. The second floor housed 37 guest rooms.

== In popular culture ==
The Castañeda appeared in the 1984 film Red Dawn, in which Las Vegas stood in for the fictional town of Calumet, Colorado, which is invaded by Soviet troops. The hotel was used as the Soviet army headquarters in the film. It also appeared in the 1994 film Speechless as the location where the main characters, played by Geena Davis and Michael Keaton, first meet. The Castañeda is featured in an episode of "Ghost Adventures" on the Travel Channel, March 23.
