= George Gill Green =

Union surgeon in the American Civil War

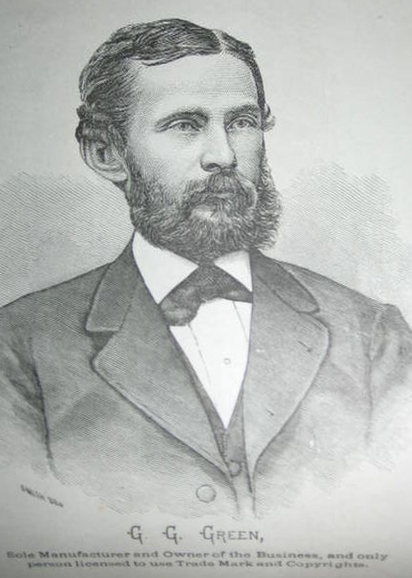
- Green circa 1878
- Born: January 16, 1842; Clarksboro, New Jersey, U.S.
- Died: February 26, 1925 (aged 83); Woodbury, New Jersey, U.S.
- Other name: G.G. Green
- Education: University of Pennsylvania (did not graduate)
- Occupation: Entrepreneur
- Known for: Sale of the elixir called "L.M. Green," a formula bought from his father
- Spouse: Angie Brown
- Parent(s): Mary Ann (1820-1844); Lewis M. Green (1818-1894)
- Military career
- Allegiance: USA
- Branch: United States Army
- Service years: 1864-1865
- Rank: Colonel
- Unit: 142nd Illinois Volunteer Infantry Regiment

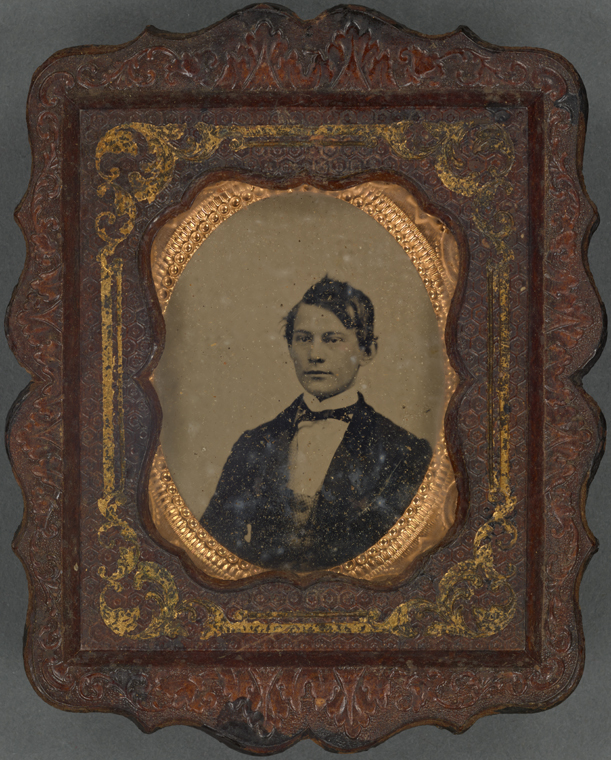
Ambrotype of George G. Green

George Gill Green (January 16, 1842 – February 26, 1925) was a patent medicine entrepreneur, and Union surgeon in the American Civil War.

== Biography ==
George Gill Green was born in Clarksboro, New Jersey, to Mary Ann and Lewis M. Green. Green's mother was from Pennsylvania and his father worked as a butcher.

Green attended the University of Pennsylvania medical school for two years, but left in 1864 before he graduated. He enlisted in the 142nd Illinois Volunteer Infantry Regiment and was active from 1864 to 1865 during the American Civil War. In 1867, he started a wholesale drug business in Baltimore but the factory was destroyed by fire. He moved to Ohio, married Angie Brown, and they had their first child there.

Green bought the rights to Green's August Flower and Dr. Boschee's German Syrup from his father, who sold the elixir under the name L.M. Green. Green created a marketing campaign involving mass mailings of free samples and the distribution of thousands of his almanacs. Both elixirs were mostly laudanum. He became a millionaire and, in 1880. he built Woodbury's Opera House in Woodbury, New Jersey; the family moved to Woodbury on November 23, 1872.

The Greens had a son, George Gill Green II, born January 17, 1883, who died in January 1971. In 1893, Green acquired an uncompleted hotel in Pasadena, California. In 1894, it was completed and opened it as the Hotel Green.

Green completed a summer home, Kil Kare Castle, in 1895 at Lake Hopatcong in New Jersey. In 1898, Green built an annex west of the Hotel Green, the Central Annex building, or Castle Green, on the block across Raymond Avenue. Castle Green is listed on the National Register of Historic Places in Pasadena, the California State Historic Landmark Register, and the City of Pasadena Register of City Treasures.

In 1903, Green added a third annex to the Hotel Green, known as the Wooster Block. His patent medicine business declined after the passage of the Pure Food and Drug Act in 1906, and by 1916 his company's products were discontinued. Green died on February 26, 1925, in Woodbury, New Jersey.

== Publications by Green ==
- G.G. Green's Diary & Almanac — first produced in 1878, printed millions of copies each year, distributed all over the world, and produced until 1916.
- George G. Green; Wit and Wisdom (pub. 1887)
