= 142nd Illinois Infantry Regiment =

142nd Regiment, Illinois Volunteer Infantry
- Illinois state flag
- Active: June 18, 1864 – October 27, 1864
- Country: United States
- Allegiance: Union
- Branch: Infantry

The 142nd Regiment, Illinois Volunteer Infantry was an infantry regiment that served in the Union Army during the American Civil War. It was among the scores of regiments that were raised in the summer of 1864 as Hundred Days Men, part of an effort to augment existing manpower for an all-out push to end the war within 100 days.

== Service ==
The 142nd Illinois organized at Freeport, Illinois, as an eight-company battalion. At Camp Butler, Illinois, two companies were added, and the regiment was mustered into Federal service on June 18, 1864, for a one-hundred-day enlistment. The 142nd Illinois guarded the Memphis and Charleston Railroad in the vicinity of Memphis, Tennessee.

The regiment was mustered out of service on October 27, 1864, at Chicago, Illinois.

== Total strength and casualties ==
The regiment suffered 30 enlisted men who died of disease, for a total of 30 fatalities.

== Commanders ==
- Colonel Rollin V. Ankeny - mustered out with the regiment.

== See also ==
- List of Illinois Civil War Units
- Illinois in the American Civil War
