= Frederick Roehrig =

American architect (1857–1948)

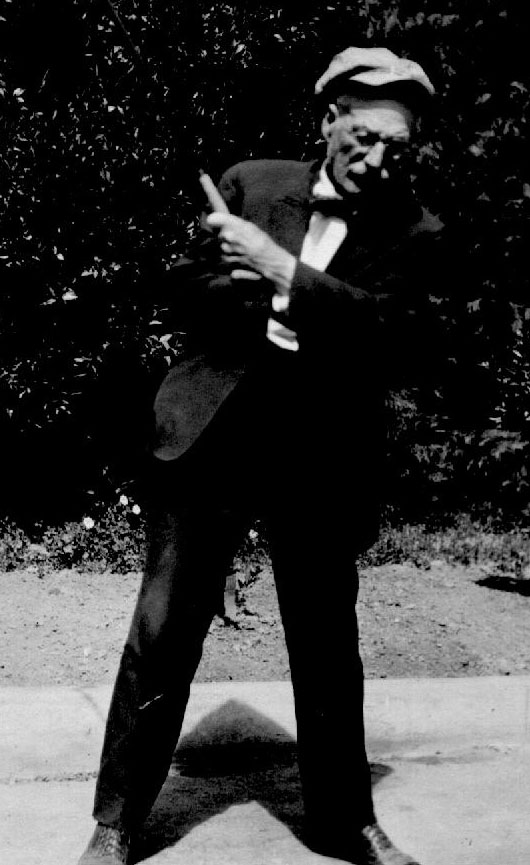
- Born: December 24, 1857; LeRoy, New York, U.S.
- Died: October 7, 1948; Pasadena, California, U.S.
- Occupation: Architect
- Buildings: Hotel Green/Castle Green; Frederick Hastings Rindge House; Ramsay-Durfee Estate; Andrew McNally House

Frederick Louis Roehrig (1857 – 1948) was an early 20th-century American architect. Roehrig was born in LeRoy, New York, the son of the noted "orientalist and philoligist," Frederick L.O. Roehrig. He graduated from Cornell University in 1883 and also studied architecture in England and France. His architectural styles evolved over time, covering the Victorian, American Craftsman, and Neo-Classical styles. Roehrig is particularly known for his many landmark buildings in Pasadena, California, including the Hotel Green, and Pasadena Heritage has occasionally conducted tours of Roehrig's buildings.

== Notable works ==
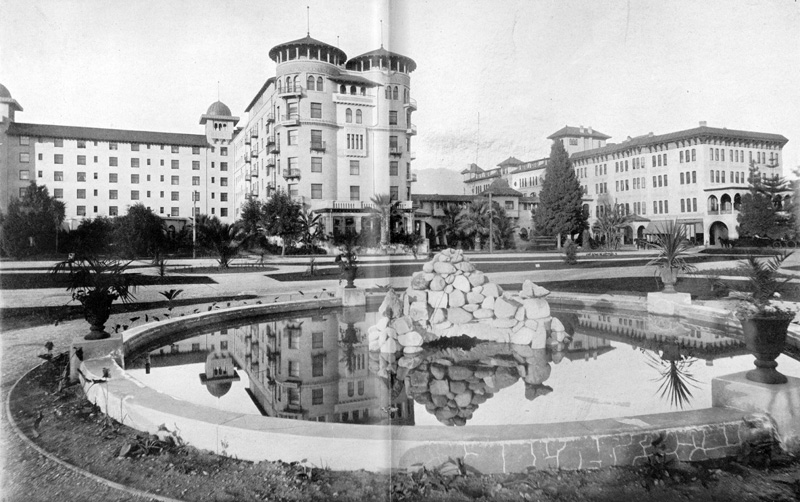
Hotel Green in Pasadena, California

Roehrig's notable works include:

- Hotel Green — The landmark Hotel Green, located at 99 South Raymond Avenue in Pasadena, California, was built in the late 19th century and helped build Roehrig's reputation. The Hotel Green was home to both the Tournament of Roses and the Valley Hunt Club. It was built by George Gill Green and was supplemented by two later buildings, including Castle Green. It was added to the National Register of Historic Places in 1982.
  - Castle Green — Another of Roehrig's landmark structures is Castle Green, built in 1898 as an annex to the Hotel Green. In 2003, the Los Angeles Times described Roehrig's concept for Castle Green as follows: "And there is Castle Green, which is not really a castle either, but a fantastic folly created from the imagination of a Victorian architect with a penchant for Arabesque opulence. ... The imposing Moorish-style structure is redolent with atmosphere, from its cylindrical turrets to its ornate cornices. You have to stop and remind yourself that this is no longer a grand turn-of-the-century hotel, but condominiums."
- Frederick Hastings Rindge House — In 1902, Roehrig designed a 25-room mansion for Frederick H. Rindge (the owner of Malibu, California) in the West Adams district of Los Angeles. Rindge House was added to the National Register of Historic Places in 1986.
- Ramsay-Durfee Estate — The Ramsay-Durfee Estate is a 42-room, 10,000-square-foot (930 m^{2}) Tudor mansion with a Craftsman interior, designed by Roehrig and built in 1908. After being occupied for 50 years by a reclusive widow, Nellie Durfee, the house was purchased by the Brothers of St. John of God in the 1970s. The mansion was added to the National Register of Historic Places in 1989.

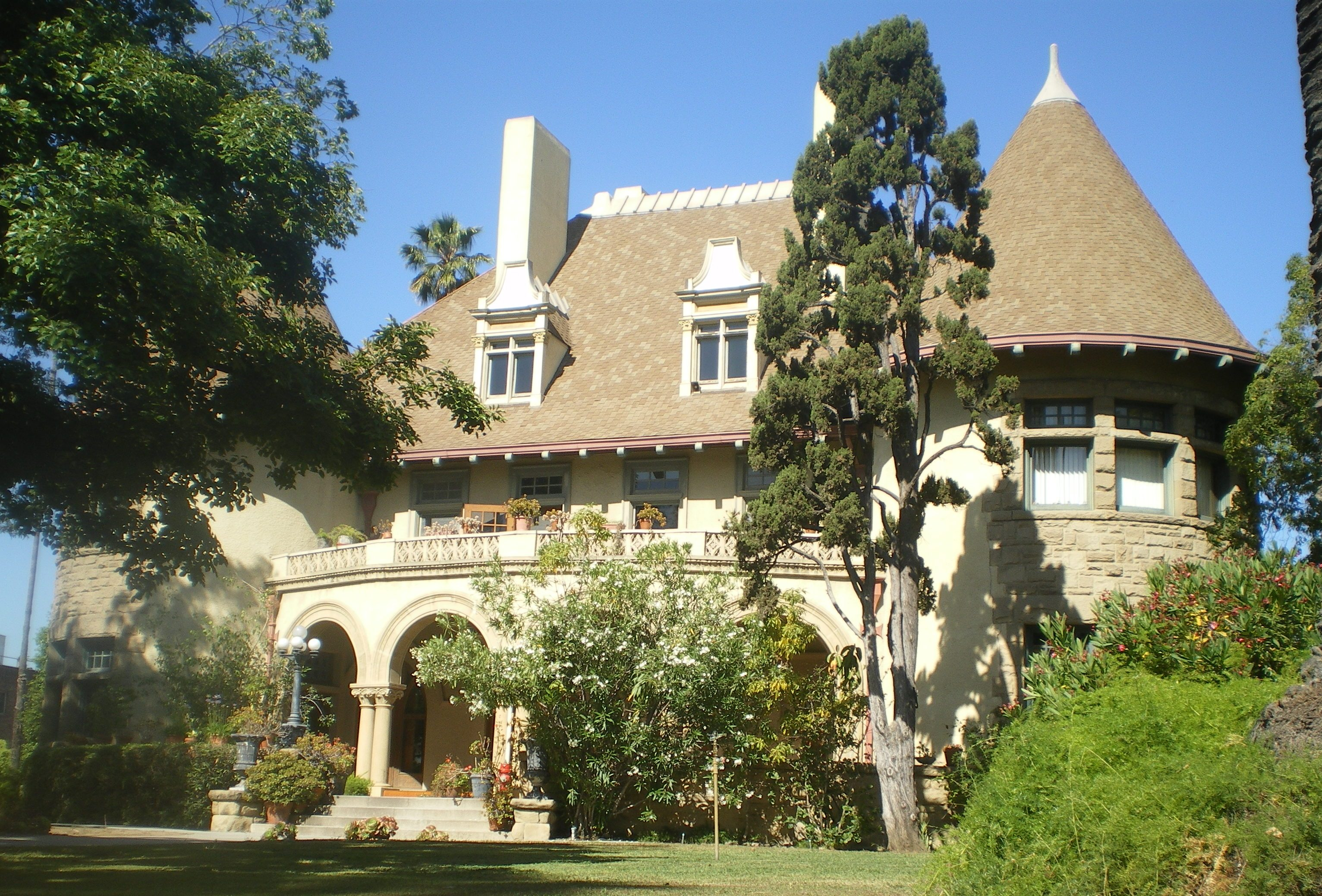
Rindge House

- Castañeda Hotel — Railroad hotel in Las Vegas, New Mexico, built in 1898–99.
- Braun Music Center — The Braun Music Center at Westridge School in Pasadena was designed by Roehrig in 1909 as a private gymnasium and theatre for a family living on Orange Grove Boulevard.
- Andrew McNally House built in 1887 for publishing tycoon Andrew McNally of Rand, McNally maps fame, the magnificent Queen Anne-style Victorian in Altadena tragically burned down during the Eaton Fire in January 2025.
- Neff Mansion — The Neff Mansion, also known as the McNally Mansion, is part of Neff Park in La Mirada, California. Three acres of the site, including the Neff Mansion, were listed on the National Register of Historic Places in 1978. The home was built in 1894 as headquarters for McNally's ranch which was run by McNally's daughter Nannie's husband, Edwin Neff whom she married in 1893. This house is also listed in the National Register of Historic Places. They soon conceived future architect to Pasadena's moneyed elite and Hollywood celebrities, Wallace Neff, who was born in the ranch house in 1895.
- The Lamon V. Harkness winter home at 1201 S. Orange Grove Avenue in Pasadena, California, a historic mansion originally built for W.C. Stuart. Located on Pasadena's famous "Millionaire's Row," the large Mission/Spanish Colonial Revival estate was acquired by Standard Oil capitalist Lamon V. Harkness around 1900. Harkness's daughter Myrtle Harkness Macomber also lived nearby in a Roehrigh home at the Thomas S. Wotkyns Residence (later the A. Kingsley Macomber Residence), built in 1898 at the southwest corner of Orange Grove Avenue and Madeline Drive in Pasadena.
- Eddy House — According to authorities at Occidental College, Eddy House was built in 1905 and designed by Roehrig. Despite efforts to save it, Eddy house was demolished in 1972 to make way for apartments.
- Mansions of "Millionaire's Row" — Roehrig also designed several mansions built between 1892 and 1917 along Pasadena's famous "Millionaire's Row" on South Orange Grove. Though many of the mansions on South Orange Grove were demolished in the 1950s and 1960s, three of Roehrig's mansions were preserved as part of the campus of the Worldwide Church of God's Ambassador College and were listed for sale in 2003., and the Mayfield Senior School located at 500 Bellefontaine St., Pasadena, CA 91105. The Beaux Arts style Italian villa was built in 1917 for the original owner John Eagle, became known as the E.J. Marshall House.
- Grace Mansion and Water Tower — Roehrig also designed a Pasadena home for William Stanton. He designed both Grace Mansion and an adjacent water tower built in 1891 to match the mansion. The tower had a wood-shingle exterior, designed to camouflage the 50,000-gallon steel water tank serving the adjacent mansion and surrounding land. The water tower was later converted into a home.
- Scoville House — Located at 280 South Orange Grove Boulevard in Pasadena, Roehrig was inspired by the Prairie House movement in designing Scoville House. The house was built in 1909.
- Louise Hugus House — Located at 805 S. Madison Avenue in Pasadena, Roehrig designed this Craftsman-style house in 1908.
- Finnish Folk Art Museum — Located at 470 West Walnut Street in Pasadena, the Finnish Folk Art Museum was built in 1911. It was built for the Finnish consul and later turned into the Finnish Folk Art Museum. It is listed on the National Register of Historic Places.
- East Wynyate — South Pasadena's Historical Landmark #43 located at 909 Lyndon Street in South Pasadena was built in 1896.
- Giroux Mansion — Located on Carmen Avenue in Hollywood Hills. It was built for Canadian-born Joseph Louis Giroux (d. 1933), who had made his fortune from mining copper in Nevada. The year following his death, the estate was purchased by nuns of the Dominican Order to establish the Monastery of the Angels. After a new building was constructed more suited to their needs, it was used as a guesthouse, until its deterioration required that it be torn down in the late 1970s.

Other buildings designed by Roehrig include First Presbyterian Church of Pasadena, Pasadena Hospital, Alhambra Library, the power house of the Los Angeles Aqueduct, and the W.H. Bartlett Estate in Montecito,

Roehrig's brother, Dr. G. Edward Roehrig, was organizer and president of the Zoological Society of Los Angeles.

Frederick Roehrig died at age 90 in 1948.
