= June Edmonds =

American painter

- Born: Los Angeles, California, United States
- Education: Tyler School of Art, San Diego State University
- Known for: Painting, public art
- Awards: Guggenheim Fellowship, AWARE Prize, City of Los Angeles (COLA), California Community Foundation
- Website: June Edmonds

June Edmonds, Gee's Jungle, oil on canvas, 40" x 30", 2011.

June Edmonds is an American painter and public artist based in Los Angeles. She is best known for patterned, thickly textured abstract paintings—most notably, her "Energy Wheel Paintings" and "Flag Paintings"—which express the social, psychological and historical complexity of Black experience. These tactile, process-oriented works employ color, shape, repetition and movement to explore themes and historic narratives involving spiritual contemplation and growth, racial and gender identity, nationality and trauma. Reviewers have likened them to sacred forms of art—the dot-paintings of Aboriginal Australians, mandalas and African textiles—as well as to architecture, music and the work of artists Alma Thomas, Joan Mitchell and Alfred Jensen, among others. Curator Jill Moniz describes Edmonds's artistic practice as offering a "language steeped in spiritual resonance, collective consciousness and cultural memory," fusing "painterly knowledge" with personal and social experience.

Edmonds has been awarded a Guggenheim Fellowship, the AWARE Prize, and City of Los Angeles (COLA) and California Community Foundation fellowships. She has completed public artwork commissions for Caltech and the cities of Inglewood, Los Angeles, Long Beach and Pasadena, as well as created a mural with Murals of La Jolla. Her art belongs to the permanent collections of the Crocker Art Museum, California African American Museum, Davis Museum, and Mead Art Museum, among others.

== Early life and career ==
June Edmonds was born in Los Angeles and grew up in the city's Crenshaw district. Her mother, a teacher, enjoyed drawing and took her on formative visits to museum exhibitions; in her late teens she was influenced by the seminal LACMA exhibition, "Two Centuries of Black American Art." Edmonds completed BA and MFA degrees at San Diego State University and Tyler School of Art respectively, and studied at the Skowhegan School of Painting and Sculpture.

Her figurative, mise-en-scène paintings of the 1980s captured young African-American life in casual moments of women playing board games or hanging out in settings filled with lively African textiles, carpets and clothing (e.g., Contrast I, 1990). Painted with a confident embrace of color and texture, the images recalled the expressive figuration of artists such as Varnette Honeywood, Charles W. White, Romare Bearden, Jacob Lawrence, David Hockney and Matisse, whose work also embraced an abstract taste for color and pattern.

June Edmonds, Contrast I, oil on canvas, 1990.

In the 1990s and early 2000s, much of Edmonds's work centered on public art commissions in the Los Angeles area. She was influenced in this direction after learning about and meeting public artists of color such as Willie Middlebrook, Sandra Rowe, Richard Wyatt Jr., John Outterbridge and Elliott Pinkney at an exhibition of work created for the Los Angeles County Metropolitan Transportation Authority (LACMTA).

== Public art projects ==
In 1995, Edmonds created a dozen circular Venetian glass mosaics depicting diverse local residents for a Long Beach metro station, becoming the second Black woman to be awarded an LACMTA commission. She produced several mosaics for recreation and community service centers subsequently, including: Why the Sun and the Moon Live in the Sky (1999), a series inspired by an ancient West African story explaining the presence of cosmological bodies; Inglewood Genesis (2000/2013), a tile mural that local students largely fabricated based their own drawings; and Portrait of Our Community (2005), a 30-foot figurative work at the Los Angeles Child Guidance Center. She also designed two large-scale wrought-iron works of linear, swirling patterns in 2001 and 2003.

Edmonds completed Ebony on Draper and Girard in 2021, a colorful, abstract mural in La Jolla that honored pioneering Black women in the city's development; based on the curved routes of old, area street maps, its undulating lines formed a leaf shape evoking feminine energy and interwoven layers of race, politics and identity. She temporarily returned to figuration in 2024 for a portrait commissioned by Caltech's Venerable House to honor the school's first Black undergraduate, Grant D. Venerable. It features two images of him—as a 1932 graduate and as an elder figure—set against biographical icons from his life she discovered through research.

== Abstract painting, 2007–present ==
Critics note that Edmond's artistic trajectory from representational to abstract imagery runs opposite to that of many other successful contemporary African-America artists. In discussions of her work, Edmonds has highlighted a tension within Black art since the Harlem Renaissance between the need for Black self-representation in a white-dominated society and the freedom to explore other artistic avenues, taken by artists such as Alma Thomas, Beauford Delaney and Norman Lewis. In 2021, critic Lita Barrie observed, "By making figurative paintings in the 1980s when figuration was out of fashion, and pursuing abstraction just when Black figuration is taking the art world by storm, Edmonds continues to defy dominant trends in order to pursue her personal process of discovery based on close observation."

Barrie and others suggest that Edmonds's visual language has developed through personal reflection and careful consideration of social and political life, artistic heritage, and significant, often neglected events and figures in Black history. Her paintings explore themes of presence, growth and resilience on a spiritual and cultural level, weaving and layering associations through formal means, as well as through allusions in their titles. Shana Nys Dambrot describes Edmonds's approach as that of "an abstract painter, a patient and precise wielder of a heavy brush, and a gifted colorist. Her signature style of architecturally placed, thick and juicy applications of pure color is a little like mosaic, a little like textile weave, a little like bird feathers."

=== "Energy Wheel" and related paintings ===
The seeds of Edmonds's mature work began with a series of swirling charcoal works (the "Black Drawings," 1997–98) that pointed her toward a new, abstract visual language. In the 2000s, she introduced color into the work and—influenced by her meditation practice—slowed to a deliberate, repetitive method that yielded her breakthrough "Energy Wheel Paintings." These energetic compositions of concentric, radiating and overlapping circles emerge out of controlled short, thick strokes of dense oil paint whose ridges create light-catching texture and shifting color. In signature paintings like Gee’s Jungle (2011), the ritual repetition of strokes conveys themes of contemplation, keeping time, counting and improvisation; its title references the well-known community of Black quiltmakers in Gee's Bend, Alabama. Critic Genie Davis compared such paintings to "visual bursts of energy, kaleidoscopic, like cosmic flowers. These are circular forms that spin wildly, yet maintain perfect symmetry and control."

As this work evolved, Edmonds extended her historical, visual and color reference points. The large, acrylic-on-unstretched canvas Story of the Ohio: For Margaret (2017) represents the story of Margaret Garner, the enslaved woman who was the inspiration for Toni Morrison's Beloved; A Tisket (2018) was a nod to a famed Ella Fitzgerald recording. In the painting Unina (2017), she explored the vesica piscis—the almond (or leaf and seed) shape formed by intersecting circles, which evokes two energies meeting to create a third. In architecture and religious art (notably, Ghanaian Adinkra symbols), the shape is associated with divine femininity, birth, spiritual crossroads, sexuality and unity. Unina also signaled her expanded use of hues representing African skin tones, a key aspect in her subsequent "Flag Paintings."

June Edmonds, Shadd Cary Flag, acrylic on linen, 74" x 50", 2020.

Edmonds employed the vesica piscis form widely in her exhibitions "Joy of Other Suns" (2021) and "Meditations on African Resilience" (2024). The former show's large paintings paid tribute to the female pioneers and cyclical nature of the Black Migration with vibrant, curvilinear abstractions recalling travel routes and topographical mapping. Christopher Knight wrote that their bold, banded shapes suggest "two-dimensional portals to sweeping, optically deep space beyond the canvas surface … The lozenge, a shape recalling a vulva, adds an element of feminine sexuality to a thrilling sense of transport and emerging spiritual power." In the later show, Edmonds drew upon the wellspring of Black ancestral memory to convey themes of faith, courage, resilience and brilliance across many generations, often employing the river leaf emblem (e.g., Grande Adage, 2024), a sacred quatrefoil that symbolized spirituality, unity and regal power in the pre-colonial Kingdom of Benin (now southern Nigeria).

=== "Flag Paintings" ===
Edmonds's draped and stretched "Flag Paintings" (2018–present) were inspired by encounters with the confederate flag in the South and by U.S. electoral politics. Her re-interpretations employ a palette derived from the spectrum of black and brown skin complexions that she accented with deep purples, greens and blues. They examine the flag as a visual statement and token of national identity relating to oppression, optimism, ownership and transformation for people of color and women. Large, dark and vertically oriented to reference Black bodies, the paintings straddle abstraction and representation, with thick columns of acrylic paint suggesting textiles or strands of genetic code while only subtly revealing themselves as flag forms.

In Edmonds's exhibition "Allegiances and Convictions" (2019), each flag's title directly alluded to a figure or story from African-American history, such as the Fifth of July or civil rights activists Claudette Colvin and Mary Ann Shadd Cary (Shadd Cary Flag, 2020). David Pagel described the show as funereal in tone, "as if the flag is being laid to rest because the ideals it has represented for centuries … no longer have a place in the nation the flag is meant to represent." The three largely black, draped flags comprising Carney and The 54 (A Memorial) (2019) commemorated the decorated Black Union soldier William Harvey Carney; sculptural, shroud-like objects, their drooping, tarnished quality suggest age, mourning and exhaustion from the weight of history.

== Recognition and exhibitions ==
Edmonds has been awarded fellowships by the John Simon Guggenheim Memorial Foundation, California Community Foundation (both 2022) and City of Los Angeles (COLA, 2018). She received grants from the Harpo Foundation, California Arts Council and Center for Cultural Innovation, among others. In 2020, she was the inaugural winner of the Paris-based AWARE Prize at The Armory Show. She has received artist residencies from the Dorland Mountain Arts Colony, Helene Wurlitzer Foundation, MacDowell, A.I.R. Studio Paducah, Ucross Foundation and Vermont Studio Center.

Her exhibition career has included appearances in group shows at the Watts Towers Art Center, California African American Museum, Los Angeles Municipal Art Gallery and Getty Villa, as well as at the Dakar Biennale (2022). She has had solo exhibitions at the Luis De Jesus Los Angeles Gallery (2019–24), Cal Poly State University (2021), and Galerie Lelong, New York, and surveys at Loyola Marymount University in Los Angeles (2021) and the Riverside Art Museum (2022).

Edmonds's work belongs to the public art collections of the California African American Museum, California Institute of Technology (Caltech), Carolyn Campagna Kleefeld Contemporary Art Museum, Columbus Museum of Art (Pizzuti Collection), Crocker Art Museum, David Owsley Museum of Art, Davis Museum, Escalette Collection of Art, Mead Art Museum, Petrucci Family Foundation, and United States Department of State.
