= List of Little Bill episodes =

Episode list for an animated series

Little Bill is an American animated children's television series created by Bill Cosby. It aired on Nickelodeon and Noggin. The main character was inspired by both Cosby's childhood and his late son, Ennis Cosby. Little Bill's catchphrase "Hello, friend!" was originally a greeting that Ennis used. The show ran for two production seasons, each containing 26 episodes (52 episodes in total).

== Series overview ==
Season	Segments	Episodes	Originally released	
Season	Segments	Episodes	First released	Last released
1	51	26	November 28, 1999	March 19, 2002
2	50	26	May 7, 2001	February 6, 2004

== Episodes ==
=== Season 1 (1999–2002) ===
The first season has a total of 26 episodes (51 segments). Most episodes are divided into two stories. The season was first announced in 1997; at first, it was planned to be a series of three specials, before it was expanded into a 26-episode season.

No. overall	No. in season	Title	Written by	Original release date	Prod. code
1	1	"The Treasure Hunt"	Fracaswell Hyman	December 5, 1999 (Nickelodeon) September 17, 2007 (Noggin)	101
1	1	"The Best Way to Play"	Fracaswell Hyman	December 5, 1999 (Nickelodeon) September 17, 2007 (Noggin)	101
"The Treasure Hunt": Little Bill goes on a treasure hunt in order to keep himself occupied on a rainy day. "The Best Way to Play": Little Bill learns that things that you want can sometimes be expensive, such as a video game. Andrew gets a Space Explorers video game, but the gameplay, sounds and designs are more boring than they expected, and they learn that playing Space Explorers outside is better.
2	2	"Monty's Roar"	Fracaswell Hyman	December 12, 1999 (Nickelodeon) September 18, 2007 (Noggin)	102
2	2	"Natural Root Pals"	Fracaswell Hyman	December 12, 1999 (Nickelodeon) September 18, 2007 (Noggin)	102
"Monty's Roar": Little Bill meets Monty, a boy with cerebral palsy who likes dinosaurs. "Natural Root Pals": Little Bill's friend Dorado helps him past the time while their mothers get their hair done at a beauty parlor.
3	3	"Zoopity Zoo"	Robert Scull	September 4, 2000 (Nickelodeon) September 20, 2007 (Noggin)	103
3	3	"The Neighborhood Park"	Robert Scull	September 4, 2000 (Nickelodeon) September 20, 2007 (Noggin)	103
"Zoopity Zoo": Little Bill learns how to make cleaning his room fun, and later they clean Andrew's room as well. "The Neighborhood Park": Little Bill and his friends and family turn a vacant lot into a park.
4	4	"Guppies"	James Still	January 9, 2000 (Nickelodeon) September 21, 2007 (Noggin)	104
4	4	"The Magic Quilt"	James Still	January 9, 2000 (Nickelodeon) September 21, 2007 (Noggin)	104
"Guppies": Little Bill takes swimming lessons with his cousin Fuchsia. He is a bit scared of the big pool at first, but soon gets used to it. "The Magic Quilt": Little Bill is afraid of the dark, but a quilt from Alice the Great helps overcome his fear of it.
5	5	"Just a Baby"	Robert Scull	November 28, 1999 (Nickelodeon) September 24, 2007 (Noggin)	105
5	5	"The Campout"	Robert Scull	November 28, 1999 (Nickelodeon) September 24, 2007 (Noggin)	105
"Just a Baby": Little Bill's baby cousin Jamal visits and Little Bill learns about babies from Brenda, Big Bill, and Bobby. "The Campout": Little Bill and Andrew pretend to play camp out in the backyard with Bobby. "Note": This is the only episode to feature Madeline Kahn. Kahn died five days after she recorded her lines for Mrs. Shapiro. This episode was dedicated to her memory.
6	6	"The Dollar"	Becky Mode	December 19, 1999 (Nickelodeon) September 25, 2007 (Noggin)	106
6	6	"The Choice"	Becky Mode	December 19, 1999 (Nickelodeon) September 25, 2007 (Noggin)	106
"The Dollar": Little Bill finds a dollar bill and contemplates what to spend it on. At Uncle Al's store, he finally decides to buy small egg-toys. "The Choice": Little Bill is upset because he never gets to choose anything at the supermarket until he, April, and Bobby have to pick out a box of cereal and Little Bill chooses the variety pack which has each of the kinds of cereal that the kids all want.
7	7	"Chicken Pox"	Eric Weiner	June 19, 2000 (Nickelodeon) September 26, 2007 (Noggin)	107
7	7	"Shipwreck Saturday"	Eric Weiner	June 19, 2000 (Nickelodeon) September 26, 2007 (Noggin)	107
"Chicken Pox": Little Bill has had the chicken pox for a week, and has to stay home and rest from a blue sox baseball game. While at home, special guests such as Miss Murray and the mailman visit him. "Shipwreck Saturday": Little Bill and his father make a toy sailing ship to sail, but a man in his canoe accidentally hits it.
8	8	"The Promise"	Lisa Jones	September 7, 2000 (Nickelodeon) September 27, 2007 (Noggin)	108
8	8	"The Practice"	Lisa Jones	September 7, 2000 (Nickelodeon) September 27, 2007 (Noggin)	108
"The Promise": Little Bill borrows his sister April's basketball trophy for show and tell, but his friends lose the ball. "The Practice": April takes Little Bill to basketball practice while Alice the Great is at the dentist, much to Little Bill's annoyance.
9	9	"The Meanest Thing to Say"	Fracaswell Hyman	February 6, 2000 (Nickelodeon) September 10, 2007 (Noggin)	109
9	9	"Lavatory Story"	Fracaswell Hyman	February 6, 2000 (Nickelodeon) September 10, 2007 (Noggin)	109
"The Meanest Thing to Say": A new boy at school named Michael bullies Little Bill and his friends by playing the dozens. "Lavatory Story": Little Bill tries to show Michael to the bathroom, or the "lavatory", with many other room visits as well.
10	10	"Big Kid"	James Still	September 6, 2000 (Nickelodeon) September 28, 2007 (Noggin)	110
10	10	"The Bills Go to Work"	James Still	September 6, 2000 (Nickelodeon) September 28, 2007 (Noggin)	110
"Big Kid": Little Bill acts like a big kid after he watches Captain Brainstorm's dog Sparky saving the planet Yubba and being called a big dog. "The Bills Go to Work": Big Bill takes Little Bill to his work for the first time to show him what he does.
11	11	"Are We There Yet?"	Adam Beechen	September 8, 2000 (Nickelodeon) July 27, 2010 (Nick Jr.)	111
11	11	"Super Family Fun Land!"	Adam Beechen	September 8, 2000 (Nickelodeon) July 27, 2010 (Nick Jr.)	111
"Are We There Yet?": Little Bill and his family take a road trip to an amusement park, but it rains along the way as they play games. "Super Family Fun Land!": The family spends time at Super Family Fun Land which has the spider and centipede rides and all the other fun rides.
12	12	"The Zoo"	Lisa Jones	February 20, 2000 (Nickelodeon) July 31, 2010 (Nick Jr.)	112
12	12	"My Pet Elephant"	Lisa Jones	February 20, 2000 (Nickelodeon) July 31, 2010 (Nick Jr.)	112
"The Zoo": Little Bill's class goes on a field trip to the zoo. Little Bill wants to see the elephants, but there are many other animals to see before that. "My Pet Elephant": Following the class's field trip to the zoo, Little Bill gets a new pet hamster and decides to name it "Elephant".
13	13	"Copy Cat"	James Still	December 4, 2000 (Nickelodeon) July 26, 2010 (Nick Jr.)	113
13	13	"Picture Day"	James Still	December 4, 2000 (Nickelodeon) July 26, 2010 (Nick Jr.)	113
"Copy Cat": Little Bill is upset when Andrew calls him a copycat. "Picture Day": Little Bill wants to pick out his own clothes for Picture Day.
14	14	"Elephant on the Loose"	Fracaswell Hyman	September 5, 2000 (Nickelodeon) July 27, 2010 (Nick Jr.)	114
14	14	"If a Bird Rings, Answer It"	Fracaswell Hyman	September 5, 2000 (Nickelodeon) July 27, 2010 (Nick Jr.)	114
"Elephant on the Loose": Elephant gets lost in the house, so the family tries to find him. "If a Bird Rings, Answer It": Little Bill finds a lost parrot with an abnormal talent.
15	15	"The Ring Bear"	Fracaswell Hyman	September 12, 2000 (Nickelodeon) February 14, 2009 (Noggin)	115
15	15	"Miss Murray's Wedding"	Fracaswell Hyman	September 12, 2000 (Nickelodeon) February 14, 2009 (Noggin)	115
"The Ring Bear": Little Bill is going to be a ring bearer and Kiku is going to be a flower girl for Miss Murray's wedding. "Miss Murray's Wedding": Miss Murray marries Dr. Winthrop Clinkscales.
16	16	"Little Bill's Adventure with Captain Brainstorm"	Fracaswell Hyman	June 4, 2000	116
Little Bill gains the confidence to go up to Captain Brainstorm and take a photo with him.
17	17	"The Birthday Present"	Lorraine Gallacher	September 13, 2000 (Nickelodeon) August 4, 2010 (Nick Jr.)	117
17	17	"The Birthday Party"	Lorraine Gallacher	September 13, 2000 (Nickelodeon) August 4, 2010 (Nick Jr.)	117
"The Birthday Present": Little Bill accidentally ruins Fuchsia's birthday present, a Gooey Bot. "The Birthday Party": Little Bill attends Fuchsia's birthday party, but is concerned when Andrew got the same kind of present as he did.
18	18	"Rolling Along"	Lorraine Gallacher	October 9, 2000 September 11, 2007 (Noggin)	118
18	18	"The Stage Trick"	Lorraine Gallacher	October 9, 2000 September 11, 2007 (Noggin)	118
"Rolling Along": Little Bill tries to learn how to roll, which he complains about until April teaches him. "The Stage Trick": Little Bill gets stage fright while practicing for a school play, so Ms. Murray teaches him a calming-down trick.
19	19	"A Trip to the Hospital"	Kim Watson	September 14, 2000 (Nickelodeon) August 9, 2010 (Nick Jr.)	119
19	19	"The Wrong Thing to Do"	Kim Watson	September 14, 2000 (Nickelodeon) August 9, 2010 (Nick Jr.)	119
"A Trip to the Hospital": Little Bill and Fuchsia are playing Wild West until Little Bill falls down, causing him to break his arm. Alice the Great takes him to the hospital and calls his mother to meet them and comfort him. "The Wrong Thing to Do": Little Bill is upset that he has to stay inside due to his broken arm, so he imagines that he is playing basketball, but takes his imagination too far when he draws on April's door and gets a timeout in his room.
20	20	"Making Mother's Day"	Lisa Jones	September 15, 2000 (Nickelodeon) May 11, 2008 (Noggin)	120
20	20	"Picture Perfect"	Lisa Jones	September 15, 2000 (Nickelodeon) May 11, 2008 (Noggin)	120
21	21	"Number One on Honeywood Street"	Fracaswell Hyman	March 19, 2002 (Nickelodeon) August 10, 2008 (Noggin)	121
21	21	"Baseball Glovers"	Fracaswell Hyman	March 19, 2002 (Nickelodeon) August 10, 2008 (Noggin)	121
22	22	"The Violin Lesson"	James Still	May 9, 2001 (Nickelodeon) April 1, 2010 (Nick Jr.)	122
22	22	"Squirmy"	James Still	May 9, 2001 (Nickelodeon) April 1, 2010 (Nick Jr.)	122
"The Violin Lesson": Little Bill unintentionally upsets Bobby when he makes fun of the way Bobby plays the violin. "Squirmy": Little Bill finds an earthworm and wants to keep it as a pet.
23	23	"Michael Sleeps Over"	Lisa Jones	March 6, 2002 (Nickelodeon) December 10, 2007 (Noggin)	123
23	23	"Michael's First Snow"	Lisa Jones	March 6, 2002 (Nickelodeon) December 10, 2007 (Noggin)	123
"Michael Sleeps Over": Michael gets homesick when he sleeps over at Little Bill's house. "Michael's First Snow": Little Bill and Michael explore the snow.
24	24	"Monty Visits"	Fracaswell Hyman	May 10, 2001 (Nickelodeon) May 11, 2008 (Noggin)	124
24	24	"Mom's Trip"	Fracaswell Hyman	May 10, 2001 (Nickelodeon) May 11, 2008 (Noggin)	124
"Monty Visits": Little Bill is jealous of Monty being with Alice the Great. "Mom's Trip": Little Bill misses his mother when she goes on an overnight business trip.
25	25	"The Snack Helper"	Fracaswell Hyman	November 13, 2000 (Nickelodeon) April 13, 2008 (Noggin)	125
25	25	"Buds"	Fracaswell Hyman	November 13, 2000 (Nickelodeon) April 13, 2008 (Noggin)	125
"The Snack Helper": Little Bill faces a tough decision on whom to send to the snack table first as the snack helper. "Buds": Little Bill and Andrew learn about nature.
26	26	"A Day at the Beach"	Kim Watson	February 12, 2002 (Nickelodeon) June 8, 2008 (Noggin)	126
26	26	"The Get Well Song"	Kim Watson	February 12, 2002 (Nickelodeon) June 8, 2008 (Noggin)	126

=== Season 2 (2001–2004) ===
Like the previous season, this season has a total of 26 episodes (50 segments).

No. overall	No. in season	Title	Written by	Prod. code	
27	1	"The Incredible Shrinking Little Bill"	Fracaswell Hyman	September 25, 2003 (Nickelodeon) August 10, 2008 (Noggin)	201
27	1	"The Big Swings"	Fracaswell Hyman	September 25, 2003 (Nickelodeon) August 10, 2008 (Noggin)	201
28	2	"The New Neighbors"	Fracaswell Hyman	September 26, 2003 (Nickelodeon) May 15, 2008 (Noggin)	202
28	2	"Doggie Magic"	Fracaswell Hyman	September 26, 2003 (Nickelodeon) May 15, 2008 (Noggin)	202
29	3	"The Car Keys"	Eric Weil and Kim Watson	February 18, 2003 (Nickelodeon) August 3, 2010 (Nick Jr.)	203
29	3	"Doggie Sitting"	Eric Weil and Kim Watson	February 18, 2003 (Nickelodeon) August 3, 2010 (Nick Jr.)	203
30	4	"Same Moon, Same Sun, Same Star"	Fracaswell Hyman	September 22, 2003 (Nickelodeon) May 11, 2008 (Noggin)	204
30	4	"All Together Now"	Fracaswell Hyman	September 22, 2003 (Nickelodeon) May 11, 2008 (Noggin)	204
31	5	"Wabbit Worries"	Adam Beechen	November 25, 2002 (Nickelodeon) (Note: Both episodes was first released in I Love Animals! VHS on February 5, 2002.) March 23, 2008 (Noggin)	205
31	5	"Wabbit Babies"	Adam Beechen	November 25, 2002 (Nickelodeon) March 23, 2008 (Noggin)	205
32	6	"Ready, Set, Read!"	Tanya Young and Joe Fallon	May 7, 2001 (Nickelodeon) September 12, 2007 (Noggin)	206
32	6	"I Got a Letter"	Tanya Young and Joe Fallon	May 7, 2001 (Nickelodeon) September 12, 2007 (Noggin)	206
"Ready, Set, Read!": Little Bill wants to learn how to read, which he does at school with the help of a word hunt and the Harry the Helpful Horse book. "I Got a Letter": Little Bill learns how to write letters, and wants to get letters of his own.
33	7	"New Foods"	Phaedra Kivu	February 19, 2003 (Nickelodeon) August 17, 2010 (Nick Jr.)	207
33	7	"Elephant Tricks"	Phaedra Kivu	February 19, 2003 (Nickelodeon) August 17, 2010 (Nick Jr.)	207
34	8	"When Friends Get Mad"	Fracaswell Hyman	February 6, 2004 (Nickelodeon) September 14, 2010 (Nick Jr.)	208
34	8	"The Party Box"	Fracaswell Hyman	February 6, 2004 (Nickelodeon) September 14, 2010 (Nick Jr.)	208
"When Friends Get Mad": Little Bill gets mad at Kiku after she accidentally spills water on his picture and refuses to apologize after he crumples up her picture in return. "The Party Box": Little Bill is disappointed when he finds that his parents and Alice the Great are having an adult party and he cannot come.
35	9	"The No-Talking Contest"	Fracaswell Hyman	May 11, 2001 (Nickelodeon) August 26, 2010 (Nick Jr.)	209
35	9	"The Search for the Sock"	Fracaswell Hyman	May 11, 2001 (Nickelodeon) August 26, 2010 (Nick Jr.)	209
"The No-Talking Contest": Little Bill, Bobby, and April have a no-talking contest, which becomes a problem when Bobby's watch is about to get thrown out. "The Search for the Sock": Little Bill loses one of April's lucky socks in her absence.
36	10	"Summertime in the Wintertime"	Adam Beechen	February 2, 2004 (Nickelodeon) (Note: Both episodes was first released in Merry Christmas Little Bill VHS on September 24, 2002.) January 30, 2008 (Noggin)	210
36	10	"Snowracer"	Adam Beechen	February 2, 2004 (Nickelodeon) January 30, 2008 (Noggin)	210
37	11	"What About Me?"	Hopi Noel Morton	February 20, 2003	211
37	11	"Happy Not Birthday to You"	Hopi Noel Morton	February 20, 2003	211
38	12	"Monty Joins the Class"	Fracaswell Hyman	March 13, 2002 (Nickelodeon) September 13, 2007 (Noggin)	212
38	12	"Dad Goes to School"	Fracaswell Hyman	March 13, 2002 (Nickelodeon) September 13, 2007 (Noggin)	212
39	13	"Racing Time"	Fracaswell Hyman	February 21, 2003 (Nickelodeon) September 14, 2007 (Noggin)	213
39	13	"All Tied Up"	Fracaswell Hyman	February 21, 2003 (Nickelodeon) September 14, 2007 (Noggin)	213
40	14	"The Surprise!"	Radha Blank	September 23, 2003	214
40	14	"Good Ol' Lightnin'"	Radha Blank	September 23, 2003	214
"The Surprise!": Little Bill tries to help prepare for Alice the Great's birthday. "Good Ol' Lightnin'": When looking at a photo album, Little Bill discovers Alice the Great's old wagon, Ol' Lightnin'.
41	15	"Get Well, Elephant"	Chris Nee	February 3, 2004	215
41	15	"Elephant's Best Friend"	Chris Nee	February 3, 2004	215
42	16	"The New Babysitter"	Hopi Noel Morton	July 30, 2003	216
42	16	"My Friend Isabel"	Hopi Noel Morton	July 30, 2003	216
"The New Babysitter": Little Bill gets a new babysitter, Isabel, who he takes some time getting used to. "My Friend Isabel": Little Bill is upset at saying goodbye to Isabel.
43	17	"The Halloween Costume"	Chris Nee	October 26, 2001 (Nickelodeon) October 31, 2007 (Noggin)	217
43	17	"The Haunted Halloween Party"	Chris Nee	October 26, 2001 (Nickelodeon) October 31, 2007 (Noggin)	217
"The Halloween Costume": Little Bill is upset that a Captain Brainstorm costume he wanted is sold out, until he makes his own from the stuff in the house. "The Haunted Halloween Party": Little Bill attends a Halloween party.
44	18	"The Best Book Ever!"	Chris Nee	July 29, 2003 (Nickelodeon) September 7, 2008 (Noggin)	218
44	18	"A Ramp for Monty"	Chris Nee	July 29, 2003 (Nickelodeon) September 7, 2008 (Noggin)	218
45	19	"The Skating Lesson"	Nancy Sans	February 4, 2004 (Nickelodeon) August 10, 2008 (Noggin)	219
45	19	"Mr. Moth"	Nancy Sans	February 4, 2004 (Nickelodeon) August 10, 2008 (Noggin)	219
"The Skating Lesson": April teaches Little Bill how to skate. "Mr. Moth": Little Bill waits for his moth to hatch, which is taking a rather long time.
46	20	"Private Time"	Charles Kipps	February 5, 2004 (Nickelodeon) May 11, 2008 (Noggin)	220
46	20	"Never"	Charles Kipps	February 5, 2004 (Nickelodeon) May 11, 2008 (Noggin)	220
47	21	"The Musical Instrument"	Luis Santiero	September 24, 2003 (Nickelodeon) March 15, 2009 (Noggin)	221
47	21	"The Choir"	Luis Santiero	September 24, 2003 (Nickelodeon) March 15, 2009 (Noggin)	221
"The Musical Instrument": Little Bill wants to play an instrument. He and Big Bill go to a music shop, but do not find the right one. Later, Little Bill uses his voice as an instrument. "The Choir": Little Bill does not listen to April's choir instructions.
48	22	"Merry Christmas, Little Bill"	Story by : Josh Selig; Teleplay by : Chris Nee	December 3, 2001 (Nickelodeon) December 21, 2007 (Noggin)	222
49	23	"I Can Sign"	Chris Nee	September 29, 2003	223
49	23	"The Sign for Friend"	Chris Nee	September 29, 2003	223
50	24	"Echo Falls"	Sonia Manzano	July 28, 2003 (Nickelodeon) June 15, 2008 (Noggin)	224
50	24	"Going Fishing"	Sonia Manzano	July 28, 2003 (Nickelodeon) June 15, 2008 (Noggin)	224
51	25	"The Early Bill"	Sonia Manzano	July 31, 2003 (Nickelodeon) July 13, 2008 (Noggin)	225
51	25	"Going Camping"	Sonia Manzano	July 31, 2003 (Nickelodeon) July 13, 2008 (Noggin)	225
52	26	"Little Bill's Giant Space Adventure"	Story by : Josh Selig; Teleplay by : Radha Blank and Robert Scull	July 8, 2002	226
