= Little Bill (book series) =

Series of children books

- Cover for The Day I Was Rich (book #9)
- Author: Bill Cosby
- Illustrator: Varnette P. Honeywood
- Cover artist: Varnette P. Honeywood
- Country: United States
- Language: English
- Publisher: Scholastic Corporation
- Published: 1997–1999
- Media type: Print

Little Bill is an out-of-commerce series of twelve children's books by Bill Cosby and Varnette Honeywood. Cosby wrote the stories, while Honeywood created the characters and made the illustrations in her typical collage style. They were originally aimed at readers aged 7 to 10 and were released from 1997 to 1999. These books were no longer available in school libraries after 2014.

The books follow a young African-American boy named Little Bill. Every story is told in the first person, and the books cover topics like boredom, bullies, honesty, courage, family, and friendship. The characters are rendered in a "bold, blocky" style with bright colors and simplified forms.

All of the books were dedicated to Cosby's late son, Ennis Cosby, and the character of Little Bill was based on him. Little Bill's catchphrase "Hello, friend!" was originally a greeting that Ennis used.

In 1999, the books were adapted into an animated series on Nickelodeon, also called Little Bill. Discussions to adapt the books took place as early as December 1997, when it was reported that Nickelodeon was "planning to produce three Little Bill specials" and that a five-day-a-week series was under discussion.

== Reception ==
The books received positive reviews, with critics praising the realistic stories and dialogue. Karen MacPherson of the Scripps Howard News Service said that "the books' story line and dialog is candid and rings true, while the bold, expressively colored illustrations by Varnette P. Honeywood help keep the reader's interest." The Bulletin of the Center for Children's Books wrote that "there's a vulnerable commonality to Little Bill that many young readers will warm to." Writing for the Orange County Register, Sandra Draper said that both "children and parents can relate to the realistic tone of the stories."

In December 1997, Oprah Winfrey chose three of the Little Bill books as selections for Oprah's Book Club. This marked the first time that children's books were selected.

== Withdrawal ==
In the wake of the sexual assault allegations against Bill Cosby in 2014, the Little Bill books have been targeted for removal from school libraries. Nickelodeon also stopped airing the TV series on its networks in 2014 after the allegations came to light.
