= Crenshaw, Los Angeles =

Crenshaw
- Neighborhood of Los Angeles
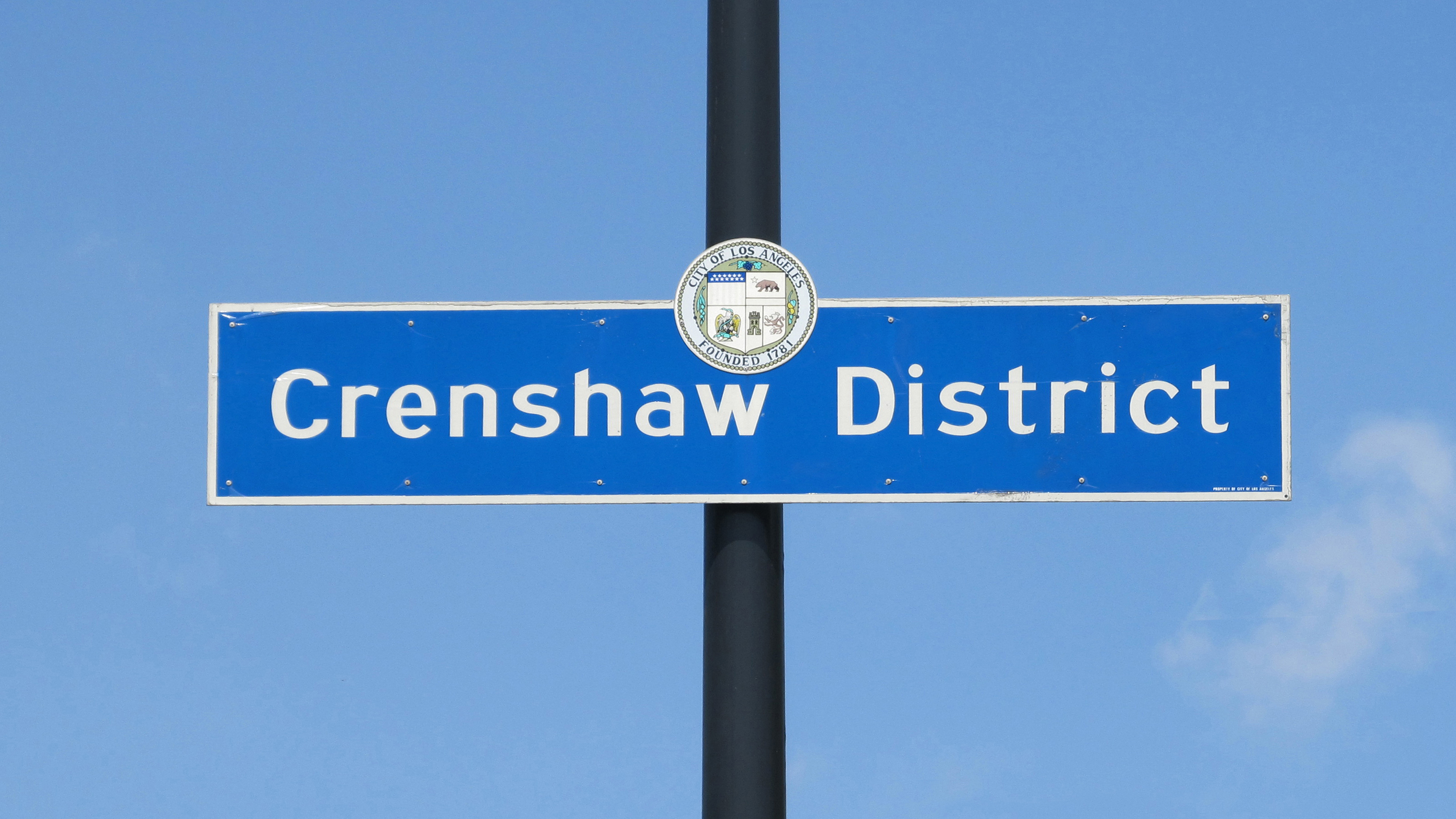
- Crenshaw, neighborhood sign located at the intersection of Crenshaw Boulevard & Slauson Avenue.
- Nickname: The 'Shaw
- Location within Western Los Angeles
- Coordinates: 34°01′05″N 118°20′26″W
- Country: United States
- State: California
- County: Los Angeles
- City: Los Angeles
- Named for: George L. Crenshaw
- Time zone: Pacific
- ZIP Code: 90008
- Area Code: 323

Crenshaw also referred to as the Crenshaw District, is a neighborhood in South Los Angeles, California.

The neighborhood's diverse cultural history is marked by an influx of Japanese Americans after World War II and the subsequent development of a thriving African American community. By the early 1970s, African Americans were Crenshaw's majority demographic group, and the neighborhood came to be known as a hub of Black culture in Los Angeles.

== History ==
Real estate developer George L. Crenshaw named the neighborhood's main commercial thoroughfare, Crenshaw Boulevard, after himself in 1904.

In 1948, the Supreme Court ruled segregated housing covenants to be unconstitutional in Shelley v. Kraemer, allowing people of all races to legally inhabit the once all-white community. Following World War II, a large Japanese American community established itself in the area. At its peak, the Japanese American settlement in Crenshaw was one of the largest in California, with about 8,000 residents.

African Americans began migrating to the district in the mid 1960s and became the majority ethnic group by the early 1970s. Due to a shared sense of discrimination, many Japanese-Americans formed close relationships with the African-American community. In the 1970s, Crenshaw, Leimert Park, and neighboring areas together had formed one of the largest African-American communities in the western United States.

The neighborhood's Japanese population dwindled in the following decades, dropping to 4,000 people in 1980 and 2,500 in 1990. Scott Shibuya Brown stated that "some say" the effect was a "belated response" to the 1965 Watts riots and that "several residents say a wave of anti-Japanese-American sentiment began cropping up in the area, prompting further departures." Eighty-two-year-old Jimmy Jike was quoted in the Los Angeles Times in 1993, stating that it was mainly because the residents' children, after attending universities, moved away. Traces of Japanese influence are still visible in the neighborhood's cuisine and architecture.

Crenshaw suffered significant damage from both the 1992 Los Angeles riots and the 1994 Northridge earthquake but was able to rebound in the late 2000s with the help of redevelopment and gentrification.

In 2018, the Baldwin Hills Crenshaw Plaza shopping mall had been approved for a major renovation plan, that would have included apartments, shops, and more restaurants. The renovation was met with community opposition and did not happen.

== Geography ==
In 1996, the Los Angeles Times defined Crenshaw as "the area bounded by the Santa Monica Freeway on the north, Van Ness Avenue on the east, Slauson Avenue on the south and La Brea Avenue on the west.

In 2012, the Los Angeles Times reiterated that "the Santa Monica Freeway, completed in 1964, created an imposing barrier between the Crenshaw District" and neighborhoods to the north.

The city has also installed a neighborhood sign at the intersection of Crenshaw Boulevard and Slauson Avenue.

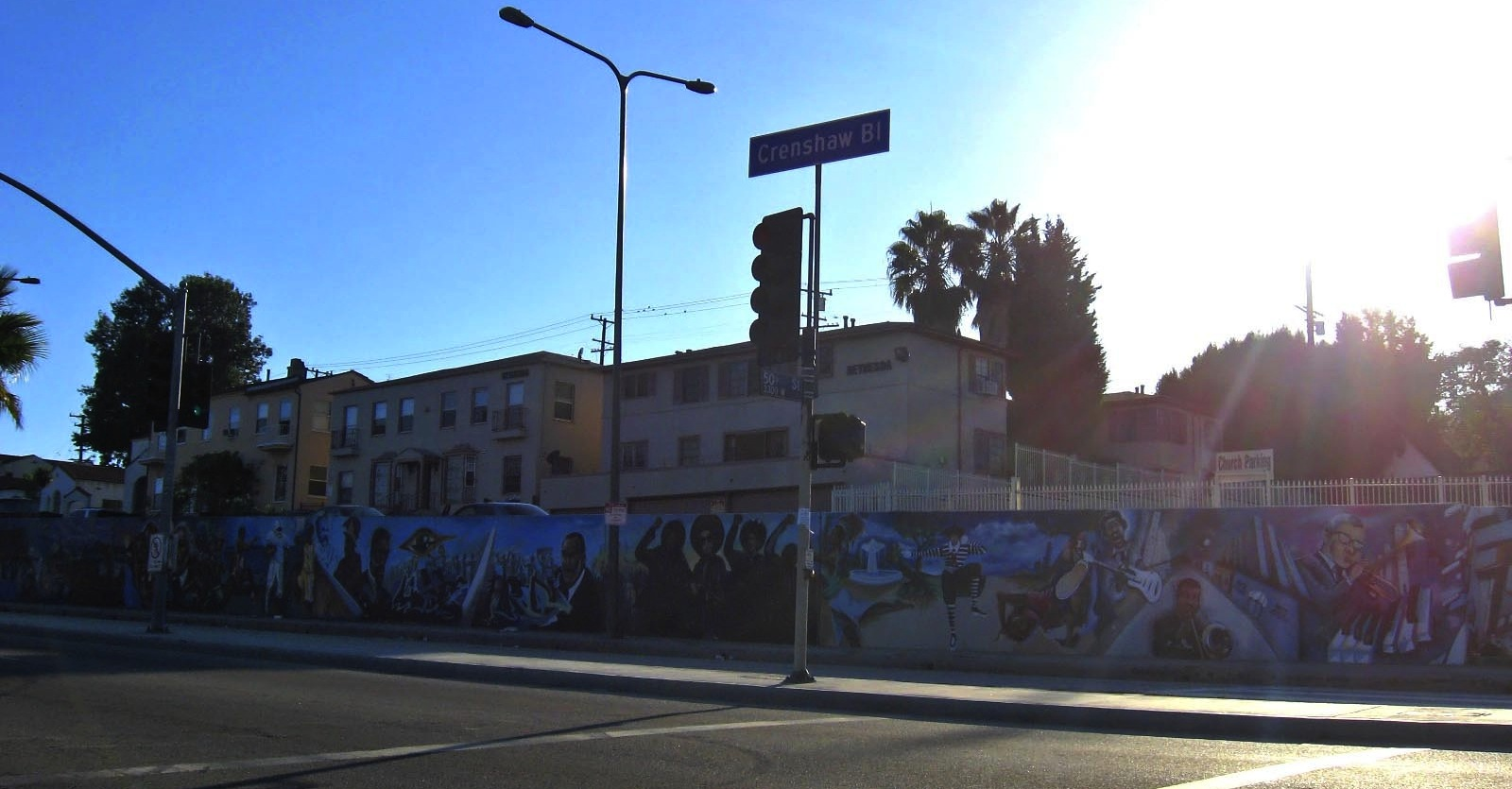
Mural of African-American Progress and apartment complexes, along Crenshaw Boulevard

== Government ==
=== Police department ===
- Police services in Baldwin Hills are provided by the Los Angeles Police Department's Southwest Division. The station is located at 1546 W. Martin Luther King Jr. Boulevard.

=== Post office ===
- Crenshaw Post Office – 3894 Crenshaw Boulevard

== Education ==
Public schools are operated by the Los Angeles Unified School District (LAUSD).

- Susan Miller Dorsey High School – 3537 Farmdale Avenue
- View Park Preparatory High School – 5701 Crenshaw Boulevard
- View Park Preparatory Middle School – 5311 Crenshaw Boulevard
- Isana Nascent Academy (Jefferson Campus) – 3417 W Jefferson Boulevard

== Demographics ==
In 2006, the population of Crenshaw was around 27,600. In 1996, there was a demographic shift increase in which many middle and lower-class blacks and Latinos migrated to cities in the Inland Empire as well as cities in the Antelope Valley sections of Southern California.

== Transportation ==
The K Line runs between Expo/Crenshaw station and Redondo Beach station, running generally north-south along Crenshaw Boulevard.

== Notable places ==
- Baldwin Hills Crenshaw Plaza shopping mall – home to T.J. Maxx.
- Destination Crenshaw
- Marlton Square (formerly known as Santa Barbara Plaza) – Home to a two level Kaiser Permanente medical clinic. The center had aged over the years and was a failed redevelopment project.
- West Angeles Church of God in Christ – 3045 Crenshaw Boulevard

== Los Angeles Historic-Cultural Monuments ==
- The Holiday Bowl was a bowling alley and café known for being a center of ethnic diversity during the 1960s and 1970s. It featured a sushi bar known as the Sakiba Lounge with live musical acts. Its historic Modernist Googie architecture style has been refurbished by the building's new tenants along with a newly outdoor shopping center that opened in early 2006. It is City of Los Angeles Historic Cultural Monument #688.

== Media ==
=== Literature ===
The novel Southland, by Nina Revoyr, is set in the Crenshaw neighborhood.

=== Motion picture ===
Boyz n the Hood – A boy is sent to live with his father in LA's Crenshaw neighborhood.

White Men Can't Jump – One of the main characters, Sidney Deane (Wesley Snipes), lives in Crenshaw.

=== Television ===
All American – The main character, Spencer James, lives in Crenshaw.

== Special events ==
- The annual Kingdom Day Parade: Celebrating Martin Luther King Jr., the Parade held its 35th edition in 2018. It is usually broadcast in the LA area on KABC-TV. The parade goes west on Martin Luther King Jr. Boulevard to Crenshaw Boulevard.
- The Taste of Soul Festival takes place every October (since 2005).

== Notable residents ==
- Tom Bradley, former mayor of Los Angeles
- V. Bozeman, singer and actress
- Darwin Cook, National Basketball Association (NBA) player
- Baron Davis, NBA player
- Eric Davis, Major League Baseball (MLB) player
- June Edmonds, painter and public artist
- Richard Elfman and Danny Elfman, musicians
- Tremaine Fowlkes, NBA player
- David Fulcher, National Football League (NFL) player
- Tiffany Haddish, comedian and actress
- James Hahn, former mayor of Los Angeles
- Kenneth Hahn (1920–1997), Los Angeles County Board of Supervisors member
- Nipsey Hussle (1985–2019), rapper, entrepreneur, community activist
- Ice Cube, rapper
- Ice-T, musician and actor
- DeSean Jackson, NFL player
- Regina King, actress
- Dom Kennedy, rapper
- Kurupt, rapper
- Arthur Lee, singer
- Lords of Lyrics, rap group
- Spencer Paysinger, NFL player
- Peter Ramsey, film director
- Issa Rae, actress
- Skee-Lo, rapper
- Darryl Strawberry, MLB player
- Syd, singer and producer
- De'Anthony Thomas, NFL player
- Pam Ward, novelist

== See also ==
- List of districts and neighborhoods of Los Angeles
- Crenshaw Boulevard
