= Victoria Park, Los Angeles =

Victoria Park
- Neighborhood of Los Angeles
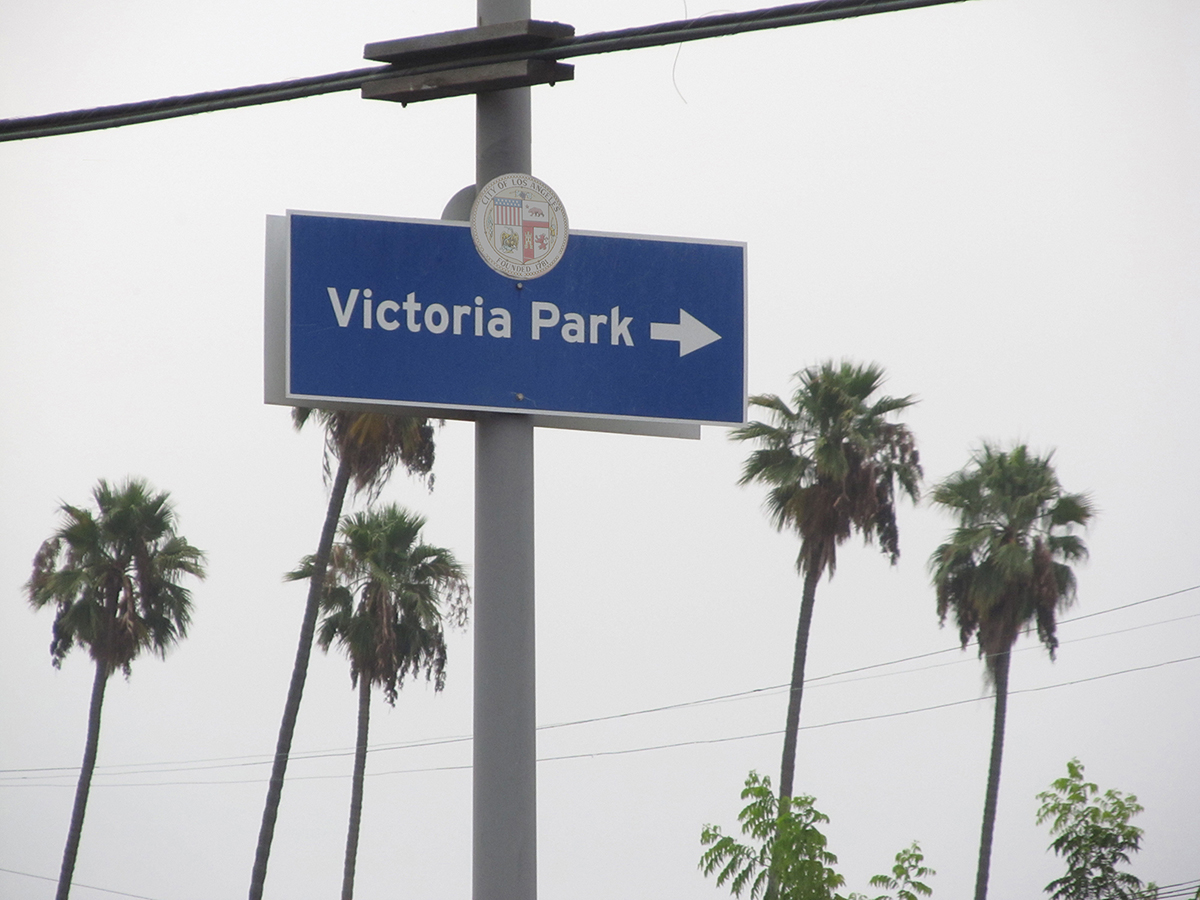
- Victoria Park sign located at the intersection of Pico Boulevard & Windsor Boulevard.

- Location within Los Angeles
- Coordinates: 34°02′48″N 118°19′50″W
- Country: United States of America
- State: California
- County: Los Angeles
- Time zone: Pacific
- Zip Code: 90019
- Area code: 323

Victoria Park is a neighborhood in the central region of Los Angeles, California. There are three Los Angeles Historic-Cultural Monuments located in Victoria Park.

== Geography ==
Located in the West Adams area, Victoria Park is bounded by Pico Boulevard on the north, the rear lot lines of Victoria Avenue on the east, Venice Boulevard on the south and West Boulevard on the west. The homes are arranged on a palm-lined circular street.

The neighborhood is 2.5 miles (4.02 km) south of Hollywood and 3.5 miles (4.83 km) west of downtown Los Angeles. Century City is five miles (8.05 km) to the west along Pico Boulevard.

The neighborhoods of Lafayette Square and Wellington Square are to the south. Windsor Square and Hancock Park are to the north.

== History ==
=== Origin ===
A first mention of Victoria Park was on January 20, 1907, in the Los Angeles Sunday Herald:

A level, elevated block of around 1000x1000 feet, between Pico and Sixteenth streets, on the West Adams Heights hill, has been bought by a syndicate of a dozen prominent business men who will improve the tract as the highest class of residence property obtainable in the city. High class improvements are planned. Surface and subway car lines are close. David Barry & Co., the selling agents, say lots will range from $1720 to $2000 in value, corners higher.

The platted but undeveloped tract was owned and offered for sale by a syndicate composed of Josias J. (Jerry) Andrews, David Barry, S.R. Barry, J.A. Bowden, E.P. Clark, H.P. Hoffman, E.G. Howard, M.P. Gilbert, Isaac Kennedy, Charles Lloyd, E.N. Mathis, J.W. Willcox, M.H. Sherman, M.O. Tremaine, B.S. Tyler, F.M. Tyler and W.E. Tyler.

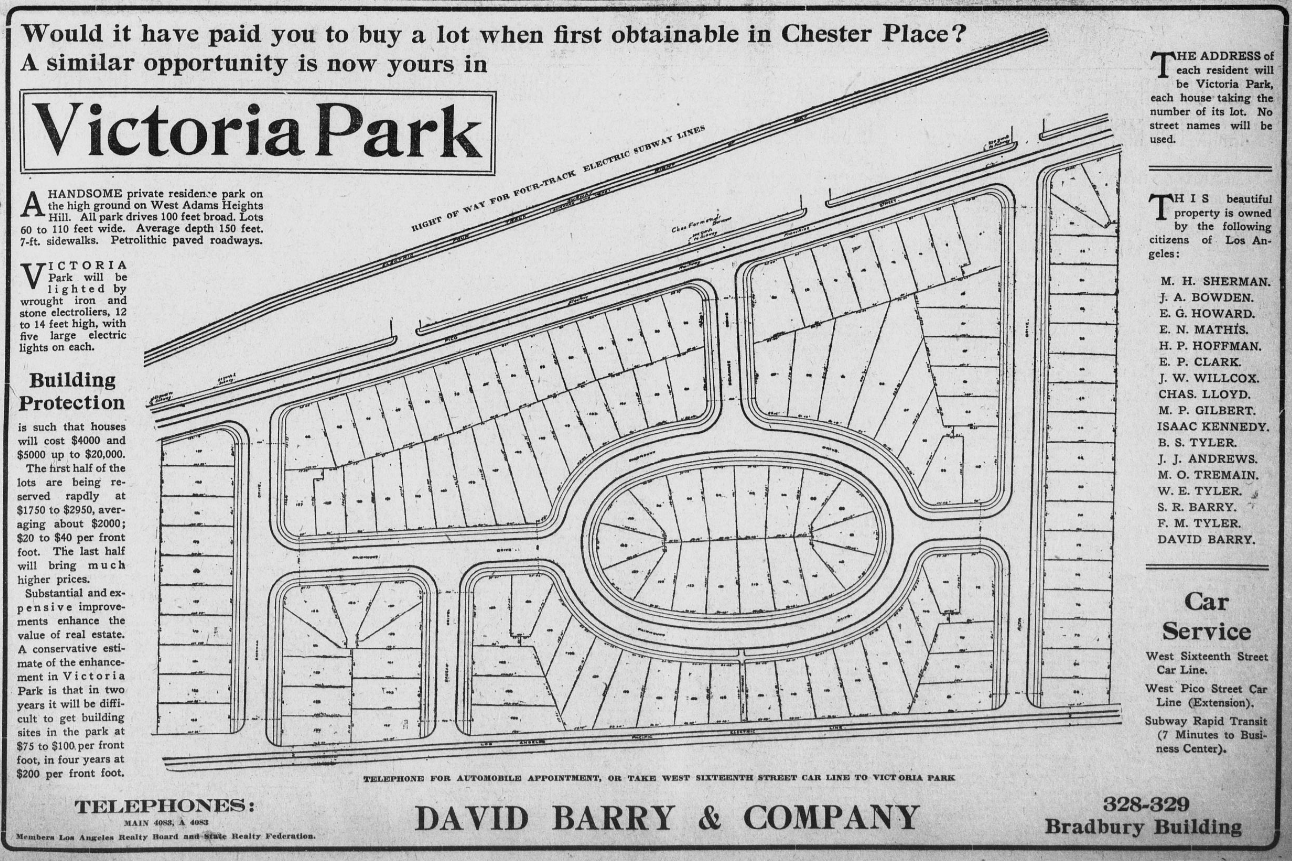
Newspaper advertisement for Victoria Park, 1907

Established "as a "desirable residence tract for desirable people", the subdivision was limited to "high-class homes" that would be built for no less than $4,000. It would be "lighted by handsome stone and wrought-iron electroliers, twelve to fourteen feet high, with five large electric lights on each".

The Victoria Park neighborhood design is based on the ideas of Frederick Law Olmsted, who felt that "circular shapes broke up the linear look of most urban areas". The area was intended to be upscale; for example, the streetlights were custom-designed and registered with the city as the "Victoria Park Fixture". Many of the homes were built between 1910 and 1915 and serve as fine architectural examples of the American Arts and Crafts Movement.

=== Drainage ===
Although the builders had promised in 1907 that Victoria Park, being "on a high hill", had "perfect drainage", property owners found two years later that rainwater was flooding down Pico Boulevard from as far west as Vermont Avenue and turning into Victoria Park "with such volume that the street work has been torn up several times". After a complaint by property owner and police commissioner J.J. Andrews to the Board of Public Works, the city's chief public works inspector said he would look into the matter but he felt not much could be done unless the property owners would pave Pico at their own expense.

=== Transportation ===
Streetcars were promised for both West 16th Street (today's Venice Boulevard) along the south boundary as well as a Pico Boulevard Line to the north. And by 1913, Pacific Electric's 16th Street Line would offer residents a 7-minute ride to downtown Los Angeles. A few years later, in 1920, Los Angeles Railway's "P" Line (Pico Line) would finally reach Victoria Park. There was also a subway line promised to and from downtown.

=== Hadacheck v. Sebastian ===
Victoria Park had a role in a landmark zoning case that reached all the way to the U.S. Supreme Court and was decided in 1915 as Hadacheck v. Sebastian. The court effectively ruled that the U.S. Constitution did not prohibit a local zoning ordinance from putting a commercial enterprise out of business.

=== Historic Signage ===
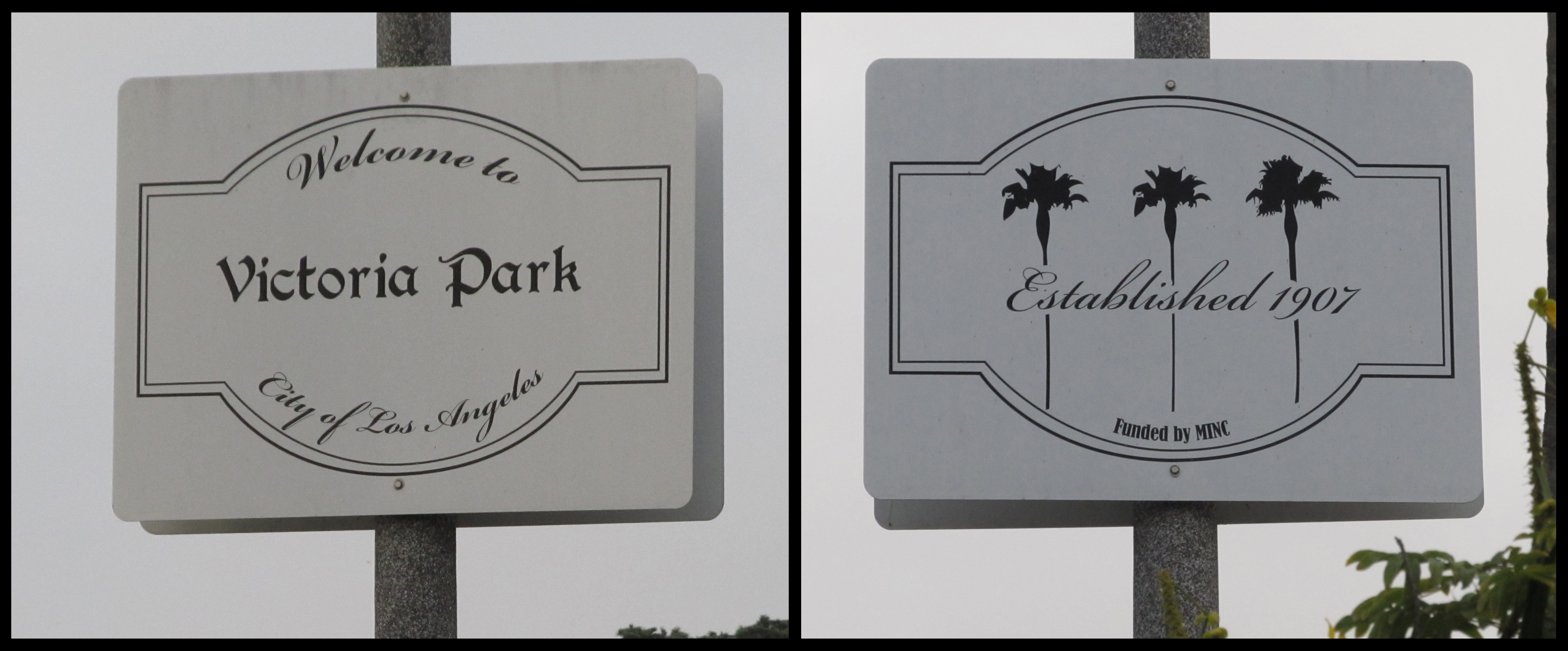
Victoria Park sign (front and back) installed in 1995

in 1995, historian Gregory Fisher met with neighborhood residents to discuss creating "Victoria Park" signage. At a cost of $150, Fischer devised a steel sign printed with a logo taken from original tract advertising to present to the community. The sign read "Welcome to Victoria Park" with the phrase "City of Los Angeles" underneath. The idea of neighborhood-identifying signage was supported by both then councilman Nate Holden and then-mayor Richard Riordan. Signs were installed on both Windsor Avenue and Victoria Avenue. The back of the sign states that they were funded by MINC (Mid-City Neighborhood Council).

=== Security ===
In 1996, a pedestrian walkway between Venice Boulevard and Victoria Park Place was closed for security reasons. The $1,000 cost was borne by Victoria Park residents.

=== Neighborhood Tours ===
On December 2–3, 2006, the West Adams Heritage Association's twentieth annual Holiday Tour, titled "A Holiday to Remember in Victoria Park", took place in the neighborhood.

On June 4, 2016, the West Adams Heritage Association sponsored a tour of 5 homes in Victoria Park. Titled "A Walk in the Park", the ticketed event was open to the public.

=== Mural Dispute ===
In 2007, an unpermitted mural was painted on the side of the "Sugar Shack", an intentional community occupying a two-story, three-bathroom house on Pico Boulevard. Victoria Park neighbors complained to the city. The L.A. Department of Building and Safety said that the mural required a permit because it was so large and abutted a major thoroughfare. After consideration, the city granted a retroactive permit for the mural. The mural has since been removed.

=== Historic Preservation Overlay Zone ===
In 2002, neighbors debated whether or not to establish a Victoria Park HPOZ. Councilman Nate Holden asked the city for funds to study five neighborhoods (including Wellington Square, Country Club Park and Jefferson Park) by October 17, 2002. Because Victoria Park residents never submitted a written application with signatures showing support for establishing an HPOZ, they were informed that their neighborhood would be studied last due to budget constraints.

The city did not produce a report to determine the neighborhood's "resource significance" until 2016. That report concluded that the neighborhood's "periods of significance" were from 1908 to 1930. It further stated that the neighborhood was an "excellent example of an Arts and Crafts neighborhood containing single- and multi-family residences in the Craftsman style. Contributors exhibit the essential character-defining features of their respective styles." It also said that Victoria Park was an "excellent example of streetcar suburbanization in the Mid-City neighborhood of Los Angeles, developed as a result of its proximity to streetcar lines that connected the area to downtown."

== Los Angeles Historic-Cultural Monuments ==
There are three Los Angeles Historic-Cultural Monuments in Victoria Park:

- 4318 Victoria Park Place - On September 18, 1998, the Craftsman home was added to the list of Los Angeles Historic-Cultural Monuments. It was built in 1912 and is Los Angeles Historic-Cultural Monument #654.
- Holmes-Shannon House, 4311 Victoria Park Drive - On August 15, 2007, it was added to both the National Register of Historic Places and the list of Los Angeles Historic-Cultural Monuments. Built in 1911, it is described as "a residential building designed in the Tudor-Craftsman style by a prominent firm and reflective of the development of Victoria Park". It is Los Angeles Historic-Cultural Monument #885.
- The Charles C. Hurd Residence, 4359 Victoria Park Place - On August 12, 2014, it was added to the list of Los Angeles Historic-Cultural Monuments. Built in 1909, the Charles C. Hurd Residence is a single-family home built in the Arts and Crafts Tudor Revival style. It is Los Angeles Historic-Cultural Monument #1073.

== Gallery of notable homes ==
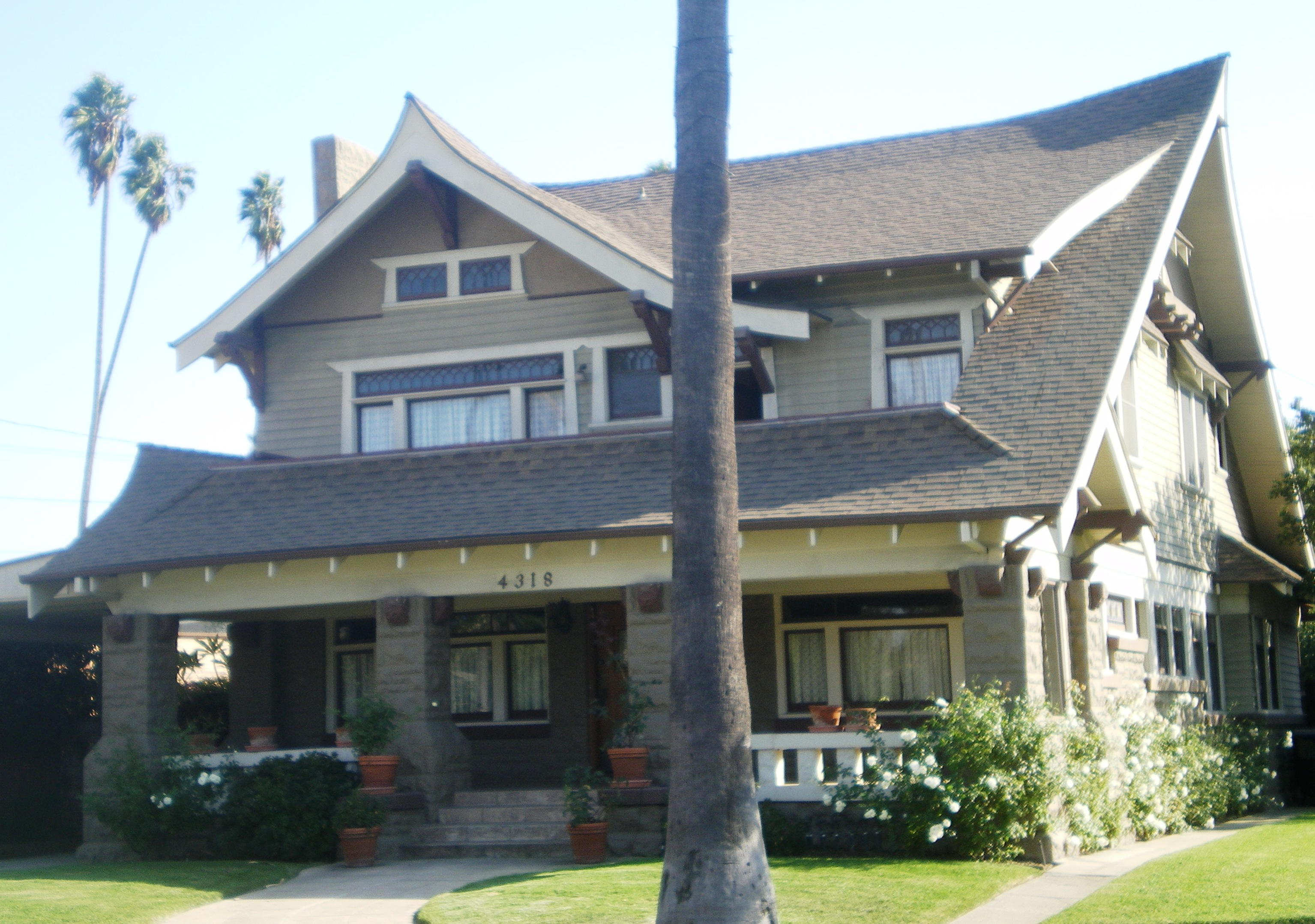
Craftsman Home
4318 Victoria Park Place
Los Angeles Historic-Cultural Monument #654

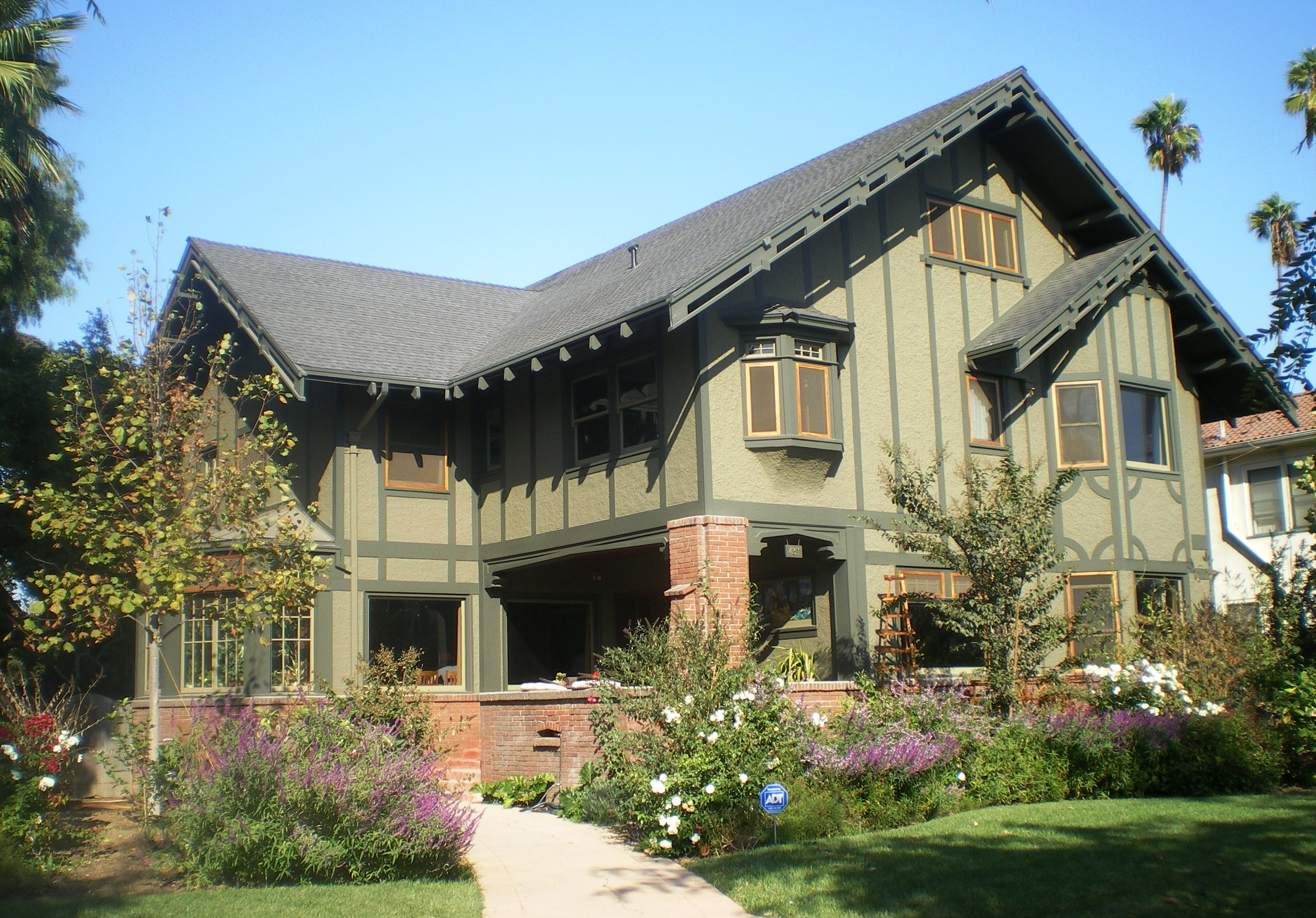
Holmes-Shannon House
4311 Victoria Park Drive
Los Angeles Historic-Cultural Monument #885

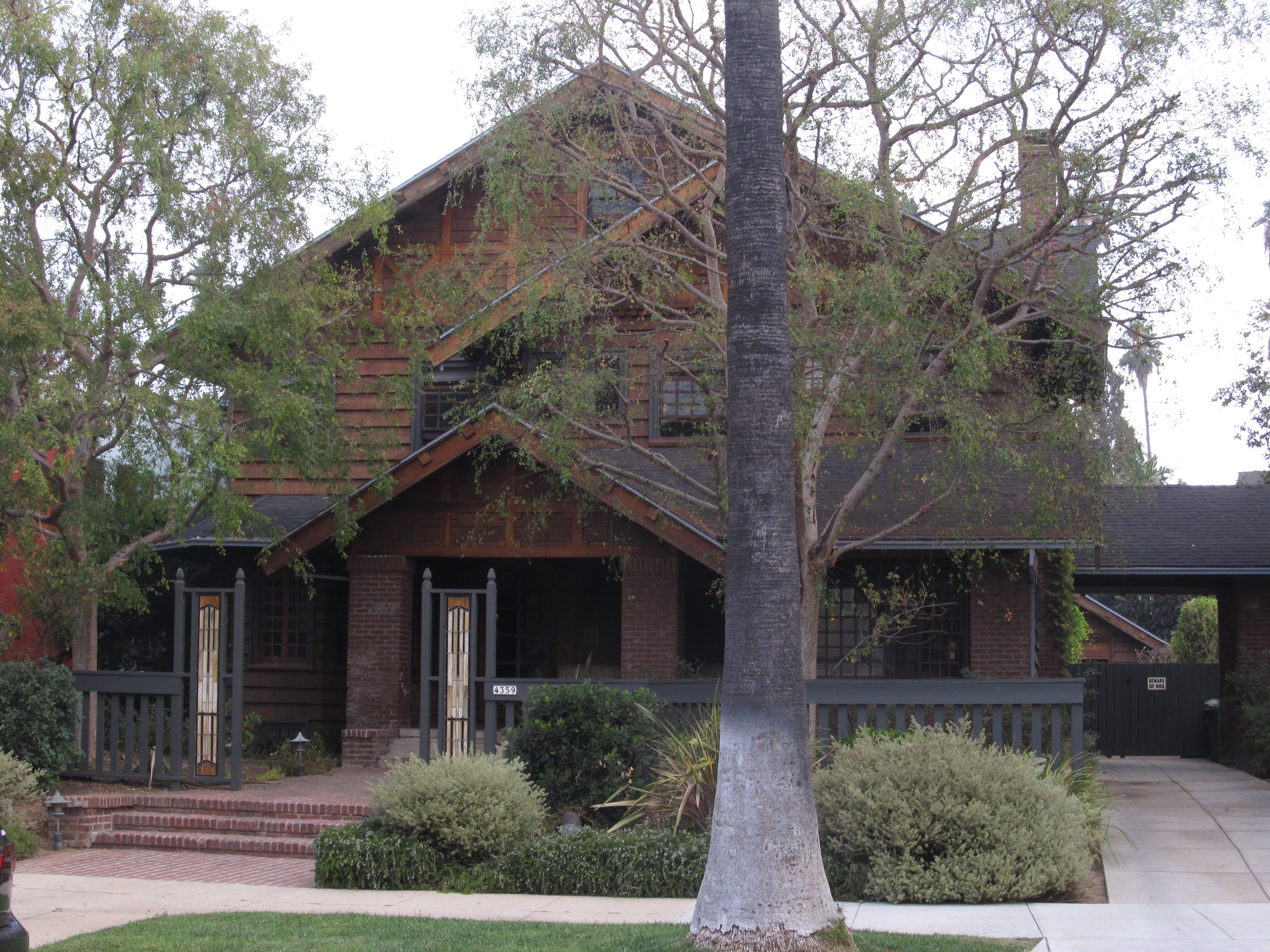
Charles C. Hurd Residence
4359 Victoria Park Place
Los Angeles Historic-Cultural Monument #1073

== Notable residents ==
- Alfred St. John - 4300 Victoria Park Drive

== In Media ==
Homes in Victoria Park have served as locations for the following feature films and TV shows:

- L.A. Confidential (1997) - 4439 Victoria Park Drive
- Insidious (2010) - 4350 Victoria Park Drive was used for the Lambert Home
- This Christmas (2007)
- Teen Wolf (2014 episodes) - 4336 Victoria Park Drive was used as Sean's house
- 9-1-1 (2018 episode) - 2143 S. Victoria Avenue
- Modern Family (2012 episode) - The interior of 4311 Victoria Park Drive was used in the episode "Open House of Horrors". (The exterior was shot at the Miller and Herriott House in North University Park.)
