= George L. Crenshaw =

American real estate developer and banker

George Lafayette Crenshaw
- Born: c. December 1855; Jasper County, Missouri
- Died: August 18, 1937; Los Angeles, California
- Occupations: Real estate developer, Banker
- Spouse: Virginia Fink Crenshaw
- Children: Zulah Clementine Crenshaw Wilson, Charles Robert Lafayette Crenshaw, Loren Oldham Crenshaw, Russell Fink Crenshaw

George Lafayette Crenshaw (c. 1855 – 1937) was an American real estate developer and banker who helped develop several upscale residential developments in mid-city Los Angeles and Southern Los Angeles neighborhoods in the early 1900s including Lafayette Square and Wellington Square. He was the owner of C.H. Brown Banking Company in Missouri and the Crenshaw Security Company in Los Angeles, California. Crenshaw Boulevard, as well as the eponymous Crenshaw neighborhood, are named after him.

== Biography ==
After the First World War, Los Angeles was a town that was looking for an uptick in population. Around the turn of the twentieth century, there was a large oil boom in southern California. Between the extraordinary climate that California had to offer and the rich resources that provided jobs in the oil and agricultural industries, the state experienced great population booms. In Los Angeles, Crenshaw invested in and oversaw ten residential real estate ventures to help satiate the growth; one of the new wealthy neighborhoods would become Wellington Square and Lafayette Square in Los Angeles.

"A man who left an indelible impression upon his adopted city was George L. Crenshaw, the real estate pioneer who died here Wednesday. His name will continue to be known because of the designation of the great boulevard in the West End area. His contributions to the (sic) upbuilding of Los Angeles from the time of his arrival here in 1905 were unceasing. He was one of a dwindling group of early-day real estate leaders whose monuments are the homes of countless thousands. They did much to acquaint the world with the attractions of Southern California. Mr. Crenshaw deserves a place in the front rank of those developers. They formed the bone and sinew of a metropolis."

== Legacy ==
The Crenshaw district of Los Angeles and its principal thoroughfare, Crenshaw Boulevard, Crenshaw High School, Crenshaw Manor and Destination Crenshaw bear his name.
