= Wellington Square, Los Angeles =

Wellington Square
- Neighborhood of Los Angeles
- Location within Los Angeles
- Coordinates: 34°02′17″N 118°20′06″W
- Country: United States of America
- State: California
- County: Los Angeles
- Time zone: Pacific
- Zip Code: 90019
- Area code: 323

Wellington Square is a neighborhood in Mid-City Los Angeles, California at the western edge of the West Adams District.

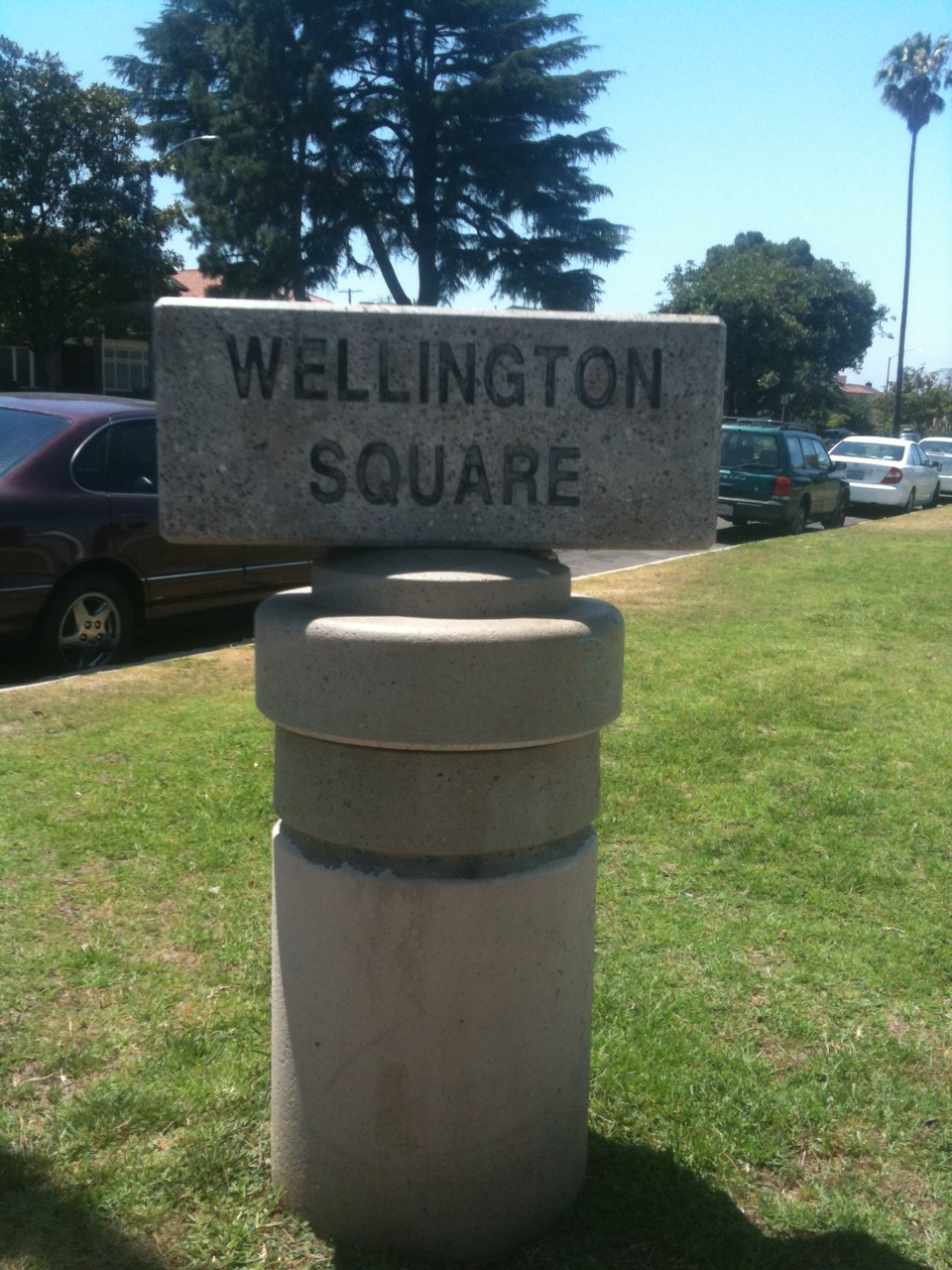
Wellington Square neighborhood sign

== Geography ==
Wellington Square consists of four streets: Victoria Avenue, Wellington Road, Virginia Road, and Buckingham Road. These four streets contain 209 homes of various architectural styles including Spanish Colonial, Tudor, Craftsman and French Norman.

The neighborhood is bordered by Washington Boulevard on the north, Crenshaw Boulevard on the east, the Santa Monica Freeway on the south and West Boulevard on the west. The neighborhood is gated at West Boulevard and 23rd Street.

The neighborhoods of LaFayette Square and Victoria Park are located north of Wellington Square.

== History ==
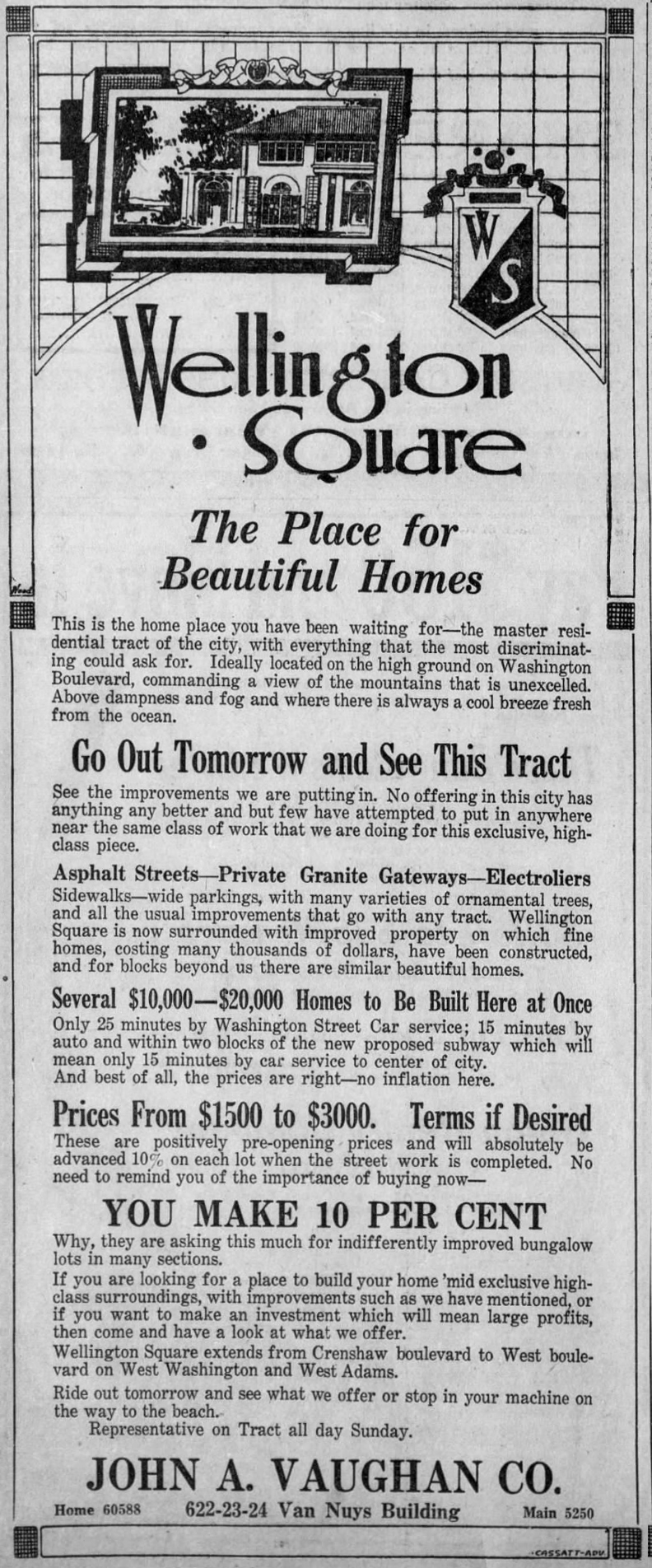
Wellington Square, 1913

Wellington Square was subdivided in 1912 by George L. Crenshaw and was developed by prominent real estate developer M.J. Nolan. In 1913, Nolan started to develop 90 acres of land between Adams Boulevard and the new La Fayette Square neighborhood. The original boundaries of Wellington Square were: Washington Boulevard on the north, Crenshaw Boulevard on the east, Adams Boulevard on the south, and West Boulevard on the west.

The boom years of the 1920s saw the peak of development of the neighborhood. Homes in the neighborhood are an architectural mixture of Craftsman and Revival styles of the 1920s and 1930s.

In 1955, construction of the Santa Monica Freeway began. Homes in the path of the freeway were taken by eminent domain and demolished by Caltrans. The freeway came through the southern portion of Wellington Square, leaving only a few homes south of the freeway. That small area is no longer considered part of the Wellington Square.

== Los Angeles Historic-Cultural Monuments ==
There is one Los Angeles Historic-Cultural Monument in Wellington Square:

- 2012 S. Victoria Avenue - The Haight-Dandridge Residence, located at 2012 S. Victoria Avenue, was added to the list of Los Angeles Historic-Cultural Monuments on October 9, 2013. It is Los Angeles Historic-Cultural Monument #1044.The house was designed and built by businessman George Washington Haight in 1908. The two-story residence exhibits character-defining features of Craftsman Style and Period Revival architecture. In 1951, the family sold the home to actress Ruby Dandridge, mother of actress Dorothy Dandridge.

== Notable people ==
- Lucius Allen
- Dorothy Dandridge
- Juanita Moore
- Dorothy Donegan
- Nick Stewart
- Evelyn Freeman

== See also ==
- West Adams Heritage Organization
