= Little Bill =

American animated children's television series

- Genre: Animated series Children's television series Educational
- Created by: Bill Cosby
- Based on: Little Bill by: Bill Cosby; Varnette P. Honeywood
- Developed by: Fracaswell Hyman
- Directed by: Robert Scull; Jennifer Oxley; Olexa Hewryk; Mark Salisbury; Robert M. Wallace; Dan Kanemoto
- Creative director: Robert Scull
- Voices of: Ruby Dee; Gregory Hines; Phylicia Rashad; Xavier Pritchett
- Theme music composer: Bill Cosby; Don Braden; Jon Faddis
- Composers: Stu Gardner; Art Lisi
- Country of origin: United States
- Original language: English
- No. of seasons: 2
- No. of episodes: 52 (101 segments) (list of episodes)

Production
- Executive producers: Smiley, Inc.: Bill Cosby; David Brokaw; Charles Kipps; Nick Jr.: Brown Johnson; Janice Burgess
- Producers: Robert Scull; Shawn Cuddy; Irene Sherman; Fracaswell Hyman
- Running time: 24 minutes
- Production companies: Smiley, Inc. (uncredited); Nickelodeon Animation Studios; Nick Jr. Productions

Original release
- Network: Nick Jr. (Note: The first 8 episodes aired Sunday nights on Nickelodeon.) (Note: On September 10, 2007, Little Bill was moved to the Noggin channel, which billed it as a "new series" and labeled episodes as "premieres.")
- Release: November 28, 1999 – February 6, 2004

Little Bill is an American animated children's television series created by Bill Cosby for Nickelodeon's Nick Jr. block. It is based on the Little Bill book series, written by Cosby with illustrations by Varnette P. Honeywood. Cosby also composed some of the theme music, appeared in live-action in the show's opening sequence, and voiced the recurring character of Captain Brainstorm. It was Cosby's second animated series, after Fat Albert and the Cosby Kids.

The show's main character, Little Bill, was partially based on Cosby's late son, Ennis Cosby. Little Bill's catchphrase "Hello, friend!" was originally a greeting that Ennis used. Each episode features Little Bill learning a lesson while interacting with his large family and group of friends. The show was developed with a panel of educational consultants.

The series originally aired on Nick Jr. from November 28, 1999 to February 6, 2004. Reruns continued to air until 2014, when the show was pulled from the air due to allegations of sexual assault against Cosby.

== Premise ==
Set in Philadelphia, the show centers on 5-year-old, African-American "Little" Bill Glover as he discovers everyday life through his imagination. Little Bill lives with his parents, his great-grandmother Alice (nicknamed Alice the Great), his older sister April, and brother Bobby. Each episode includes a daydreaming sequence where Little Bill imagines a fantastical scenario. At the end of every episode, he breaks the fourth wall by summarizing his day to the audience by talking to the audience or Elephant, his hamster, before going to bed, and a family member off-screen asks, "Little Bill, who are you talking to?" causing Little Bill to laugh as a signal for "Bye! See you next time.".

== Episodes ==
Season	Segments	Episodes	Originally released	
Season	Segments	Episodes	First released	Last released
1	51	26	November 28, 1999	March 19, 2002
2	50	26	May 7, 2001	February 6, 2004

== Characters ==
The series' main characters. Top row, from left to right: Miss Murray, Brenda, Big Bill, April, and Alice the Great. Bottom row: Fuchsia, Bobby, Little Bill (holding Elephant), Kiku, and Andrew.

=== Glover household ===
- William "Little Bill" Glover Jr. (voiced by Xavier Pritchett) is an inquisitive 5-year-old boy. He has a knack for storytelling and often finds himself daydreaming his own fantasy worlds. Little Bill's personality was inspired by Bill Cosby's late son, Ennis Cosby, and his catchphrase "Hello, friend!" was a greeting that Ennis often used.
- William "Big Bill" Glover Sr. (voiced by Gregory Hines) is the city's building inspector who is Little Bill, Bobby, and April's father, and Brenda's husband. He is nicknamed Big Bill since both he and his son are named Bill. In an interview, Bill Cosby said, "I am Big Bill."
- Brenda Glover (née Kendall; voiced by Phylicia Rashad) is Little Bill, Bobby, and April's mother, and Big Bill's wife. Brenda's voice actress, Phylicia Rashad, had previously played Clair Huxtable (wife to Cosby's character, Cliff Huxtable) on the 1980s sitcom The Cosby Show and Ruth Lucas (wife to Cosby's other character, Hilton Lucas) on Cosby.
- April Glover (voiced by Monique Beasley) is the 10-year-old oldest child and only daughter of Brenda and Big Bill. She tends to be competitive and plays basketball.
- Robert "Bobby" Glover (voiced by Devon Malik Beckford in Season 1 and Tyler James Williams in Season 2) is the middle child and the oldest son of the Glover children. He is an 8-year-old Boy Scout and plays the violin.
- Alice "Alice the Great" Kendall (voiced by Ruby Dee and Anika Walker in a flashback in "Good Ol' Lightning") is the maternal great-grandmother of Little Bill, Bobby, April, and Jamal. Alice is also Brenda and Deborah's grandmother. She is in her seventies and lives with the family.
- Elephant is the family's pet, a small, light golden hamster who lives in Little Bill's bedroom. He often rolls all over the house in a plastic hamster ball. He was named after Little Bill's favorite animal.

=== Family members, friends and neighbors ===
- Captain Brainstorm (voiced by Bill Cosby) is Little Bill's favorite superhero. He is an astronaut with his own TV show, Space Explorers. He rides an orange rocket and wears an orange spacesuit.
- Miss Aisha Murray (voiced by Ayo Haynes in Season 1 and Melanie Nicholls-King in Season 2) is Little Bill's brightest kindergarten teacher. She has brown dreads and wears purple glasses. She marries Dr. Winthorp Clinkscales in "Miss Murray's Wedding".
- Fuchsia Glover (voiced by Nakia Williams in the first episode and Kianna Underwood for the rest) is the paternal cousin of Little Bill, Bobby, and April. Her mother is named Vanessa and her father is named Al. She is known for always speaking her mind.
- Andrew Mulligan (voiced by Zach Tyler Eisen) is an Irish-American boy who is Little Bill's best friend. He lives two houses away from Little Bill. He has an active imagination like Little Bill, and they often join each other in fantasy sequences. He has a pet dog named Farfy.
- Kiku Natsuko (voiced by Eunice Cho) is an Asian-American friend of Little Bill's. She likes to be creative, putting on puppet shows, and making artwork. She is very ambitious and wants to be president when she grows up.
- Uncle Alan "Al" Glover (voiced by Michael Green) is Big Bill's brother, Brenda's brother in-law, Fuchsia's father, Vanessa's husband, and Little Bill, Bobby, and April's paternal uncle. He works at the convenience store while living in a town.
- Monty (voiced by Cole Hawkins) is the disabled grandson of Alice the Great's friend Emmaline. He uses a wheelchair to get around, because of being born with cerebral palsy. Later in the series, he joins Little Bill's class.
- Dorado (voiced by Vincent Canales) is Little Bill's friend who is of Puerto Rican ancestry.
- Valencia (voiced by Rosie Perez in Season 1, and Mary Birdsong in Season 4) is Dorado's single mother who is also of Puerto Rican ancestry. She speaks English and Spanish with a Puerto Rican accent.
- Michael Riley (voiced by Muhammad Cunningham) is a classmate of Little Bill's who moves to the neighborhood from the Southern city of Miami. At first, he is somewhat of a bully by playing ranking with Little Bill, but he reforms and befriends him in the end.
- Mrs. Shapiro (voiced by Madeline Kahn in her first appearance, and later by Kathy Najimy after Kahn's death) is Little Bill's 50-year-old red haired neighbor who wears glasses. In "Same Moon, Same Sun, Same Star", Mrs. Shapiro and her brunette sister, Mimi, grew up in Hawaii. In the same episode, Mrs. Shapiro moves back to Hawaii to live with Mimi because she misses her.
- Dr. Winthrop Clinkscales (voiced by Christopher Grossett) is Mrs. Murray's husband, whom she married in "Miss Murray's Wedding".
- Mr. Miguel Rojas (voiced by Victor Argo) is an elderly Mexican-American man who speaks two languages: English and Spanish with a Mexican accent. In "The New Neighbors", he and his dog, Miguelito "Lito", move into Mrs. Shapiro's old house after Mrs. Shapiro moved away.
- Mr. Clark Terry (voiced by Clark Terry) is Alice the Great and Little Bill's new friend.
- Baby Jamal Welsh is Little Bill, Bobby and April's maternal baby cousin (on his mother's side), son of Aunt Deborah (Brenda's sister) and Uncle Gary.
- Percy Mulch (voiced by Doug E. Doug) is the African-Caribbean owner of a pet shop.
- Mr. Williams (voiced by Mike Mearian) is a music store owner.
- Aunt Deborah Kendall (voiced by Grace Garland) is Brenda's younger sister, Big Bill's sister in-law, Little Bill, Bobby and April's maternal aunt, Uncle Gary's wife (voiced by Weston Clark) and Baby Jamal's mother.

== Merchandising ==
A PC video game, Little Bill Thinks Big, was released on September 29, 2003, for Windows XP and Macintosh, by Scholastic. In 2017, the American Library Association reported that the Little Bill series of books was most often targeted for removal in school libraries due to the sexual assault allegations against Bill Cosby.

== Production, broadcast, and home media ==
Little Bill was first announced in 1997. It aired on Nickelodeon from November 28, 1999, to February 6, 2004. The first eight episodes premiered on Sunday nights before airing on its preschool-aimed morning block Nick Jr. at a later date. The series confirmed a regular weekday timeslot on Nick Jr. starting on September 4, 2000. Nick Jr. aired reruns until December 22, 2006. The series also aired on CBS during the Nick on CBS block from September 16, 2000 until September 9, 2006. In September 2007, Little Bill was moved to the Noggin channel, which advertised it as a "new series". Noggin aired five "premiere episodes" from September 10 to September 15, 2007.

Reruns of Little Bill were shown on Nick Jr. from September 28, 2009, until February 21, 2014, when Nickelodeon removed the series from its services Commenting on the show's removal from television, Distractify wrote: "Perhaps Little Bill should be left in the past."

In December 2014, TV Guide noted that Little Bill episodes had become difficult to find after the allegations, since the show no longer aired on television.

During the 2000s, several episodes were released on VHS and DVD by Paramount Home Entertainment. Though the show has never been added to Paramount+ amidst the allegations, certain episodes remain available for purchase through the video stores of Amazon, Apple and Fandango at Home.

=== Main home video releases ===
Name	Release date	Number of episodes	Episode titles
Me and My Family	June 5, 2001	4	"Are We There Yet?"/"Super Family Fun Land!"; "The Neighborhood Park"/"The Magic Quilt"
Big Little Bill	June 5, 2001	4	"Big Kid"/"Just a Baby"; "The Bills Go to Work"/"Miss Murray's Wedding"
What I Did at School	August 21, 2001	4	"Picture Day"/"Copy Cat"; "The Snack Helper"/"The Stage Trick"
I Love Animals!	February 5, 2002	4	"The Zoo"/"My Pet Elephant"; "Wabbit Worries"/"Wabbit Babies"
Merry Christmas, Little Bill!	September 24, 2002	3	"Merry Christmas, Little Bill!"; "Summertime in the Wintertime"/"Snowracer"

=== Episodes on Nick Jr. compilation DVDs ===
Name	Release date	Number of episodes	Episode titles
Nick Jr. Holiday	September 24, 2002	1	"Merry Christmas, Little Bill!"
Nick Jr. Celebrates Spring!	March 2, 2004	2	"The Skating Lesson"/"Mr. Moth"
Nick Jr. Favorites Vol. 1	May 24, 2005	1	"Little Bill's Adventure with Captain Brainstorm"
Nick Jr. Favorites Vol. 2	October 18, 2005	1	"Little Bill's Giant Space Adventure"
Nick Jr. Favorites Vol. 3	February 7, 2006	2	"Same Moon, Same Sun, Same Star"/"All Together Now"
Nick Jr. Favorites Vol. 4	June 6, 2006	2	"Racing Time"/"All Tied Up"
Nick Jr. Favorites Holiday	September 26, 2006	1	"Merry Christmas, Little Bill!"
Nick Jr. Favorites Vol. 5	March 13, 2007	2	"The Zoo"/"My Pet Elephant"
Nick Jr. Favorites Vol. 6	August 7, 2007	2	"Ready, Set, Read!"/"I Got a Letter"

== Awards ==
Emmy Awards

- 2001 – Outstanding Individual in Animation - Jane Howell and Jonny Belt
- 2003 – Outstanding Performer In An Animated Program – Gregory Hines
- 2004 – Outstanding Children's Animated Program

Peabody Award

- 2001
