= Lafayette Square, Los Angeles =

LaFayette Square
- Neighborhood of Los Angeles
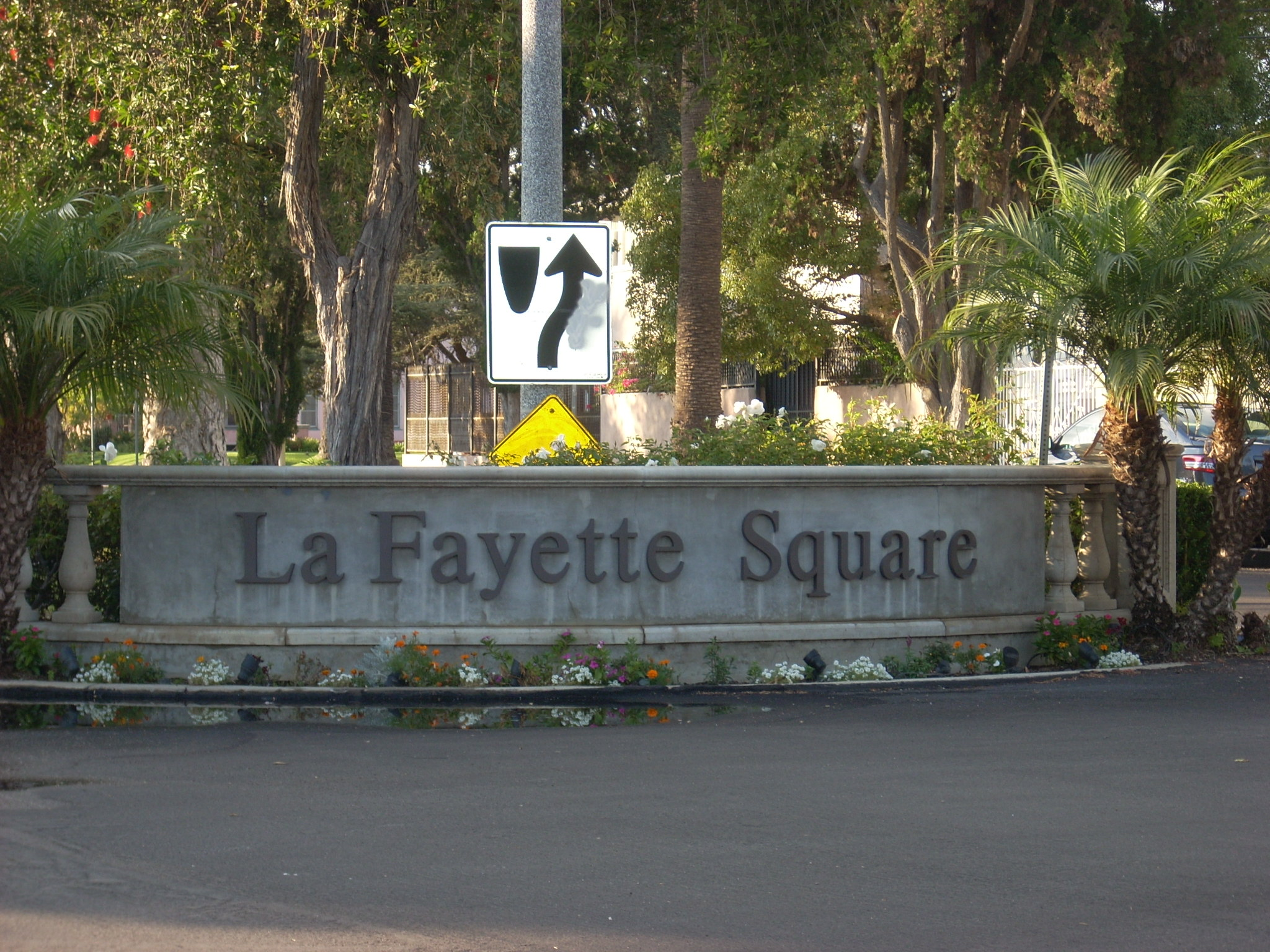
- The LaFayette Square neighborhood sign at St. Charles Place, around 2015

- Location within Central Los Angeles
- Coordinates: 34.043°N 118.333°W
- Country: United States of America
- State: California
- County: Los Angeles
- Time zone: Pacific
- Zip Code: 90019
- Area codes: 310/424, 323

Map from the Los Angeles Times, January 1989

LaFayette Square, originally named La Fayette Square, is a semi-gated neighborhood in the central region of Los Angeles, California.

The neighborhood was founded in 1913 by real estate developer George Lafayette Crenshaw, and named after the French Marquis de Lafayette, who fought alongside Colonists in the American Revolution. Lying west of Crenshaw Boulevard in the Mid-City area, it was designated by the city as a Los Angeles Historic Preservation Overlay Zone in 2000 for its significant residential architecture and history.

== History ==
=== Early sales ===
Properties in the tract, which was described as "part of the Nadeau Rancho vineyard," between "Washington and Sixteenth streets . . . immediately west of Crenshaw Boulevard" went on sale in 1913.

According to the Los Angeles Conservancy, "LaFayette Square was the last and greatest of banker George L. Crenshaw's ten residential developments in the City of Los Angeles." The tract is composed of four north-south streets with an east-west grassy divider.

Unsold lots were liquidated in early 1920.

=== Viaduct ===
A 1920 advertisement in the Los Angeles Times using the original name of La Fayette Square.

A petition to the city by Lafayette Square residents in September 1915 urged construction of a level crossing to bring West Boulevard across the Pacific Electric tracks. Without it, the petitioners said, ""children have to walk two miles to school" and stores refused to make deliveries because of the distance around the blockage. Instead, the city's Public Utilities Board approved plans for a more expensive viaduct over the tracks, saying a level crossing would be the worst "death-trap" in the city were it built.

After visiting the site, the City Council approved a $40,000 viaduct for which Pacific Electric would pay half the cost and the city and land owners would pay the rest. Property owners agreed. Construction on the viaduct took place in 1920. The link offered "a safe route of only four blocks to the million-dollar Los Angeles High School and . . . direct access to the West Hollywood and Beverly Hills district[s] by way of Pico and Wilshire Boulevards."

=== Gates ===
Around 1980, the Lafayette Square Association proposed closing entrances to the neighborhood by blocking the ends of the streets to create cul-de-sacs. Neighbors debated issues of crime, traffic speed and emergency vehicle access. In 1989, the Los Angeles City Council unanimously approved the plans.

In the early 1990s, wrought-iron gates were installed at the ends of Buckingham Road, Virginia Road, Wellington Road and Victoria Avenue. The only way to enter the neighborhood by car is at St. Charles Place. To pay for the enclosures, the homeowners were assessed $40 per year for 10 years.

== Geography ==
Los Angeles Express advertisement for Lafayette Square tract, January 1913

LaFayette Square is situated about 7 miles (11 km) west of Downtown Los Angeles. It is south of Victoria Park, east of Arlington Heights and north of Wellington Square.

The neighborhood consists of eight blocks, centered on St. Charles Place, and situated between Venice Boulevard on the north, Washington Boulevard on the south, Crenshaw Boulevard on the east and West Boulevard on the west. There are 236 homes in the neighborhood.

== Residences ==
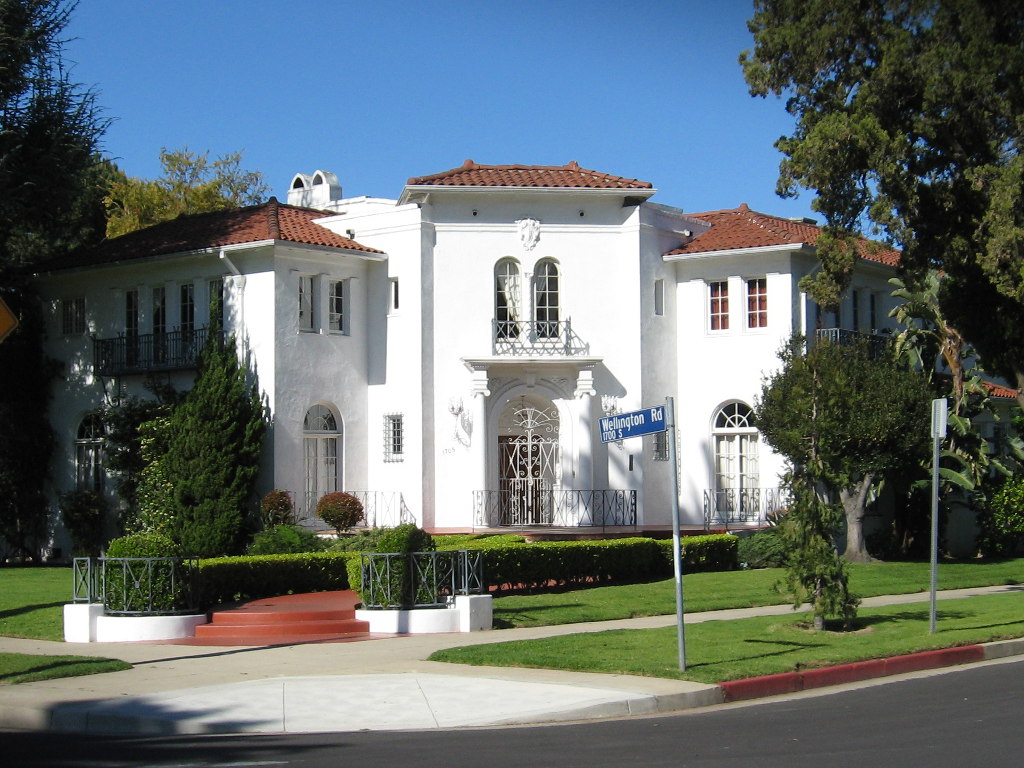
Mediterranean Revival style home in Lafayette Square, 2012

The neighborhood was designed for wealthy families and now-historic houses regularly have 5,000 to 6,000 square feet (600 m^{2}) floor plans, although the average home size is 3,600 square feet (330 m^{2}). According to a Los Angeles Times real-estate section article on the neighborhood, "Most of the properties have period details: Juliet balconies, mahogany staircases and libraries, sitting rooms, stained glass windows, triple crown molding, soaring ceilings—even four-car garages."

== Demographics ==
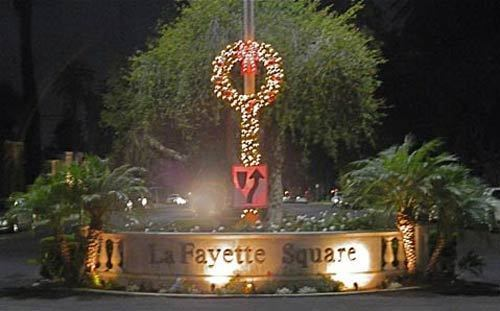
The LaFayette Square neighborhood sign during Christmas

Home ownership shifted "between white-only homeownership during the 1920s through the 1940s to nearly all African American" in the 1950s with court decisions lifting restrictive covenants against black people. The community became more racially mixed "as more white families, priced out of the Westside and Hancock Park" began returning in the early 1990s.

== Schools ==
The neighborhood is zoned to the following schools in the Los Angeles Unified School District:

- Alta Loma Elementary School
- Johnnie L. Cochran Jr. Middle School (formerly Mount Vernon Middle School)
- Los Angeles High School

== Notable residents ==
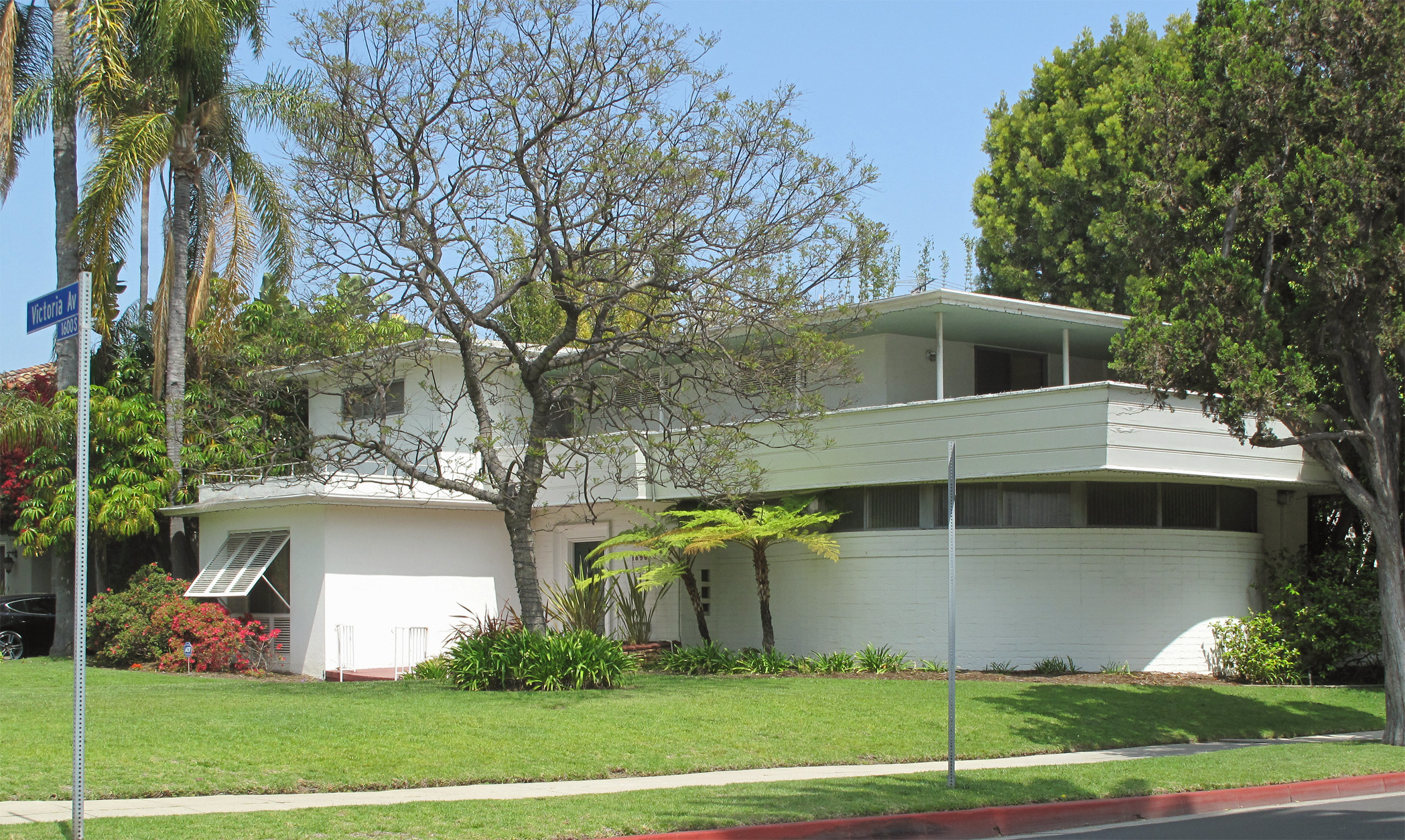
Paul R. Williams residence, 2012

In chronological order by birth year

- William Claude Dukenfield, W.C. Fields (1880-1946), actor
- George Pepperdine (1886-1962), entrepreneur and philanthropist, founder of Pepperdine University
- Roscoe Conkling Arbuckle, Fatty Arbuckle (1887-1933), actor
- Paul R. Williams (1894-1980), architect
- Norton Simon (1907-1993), art collector
- Joseph Louis Barrow, Joe Louis (1914-1981), boxer
- Vaino Spencer (1920-2016), lawyer and judge
- Paul Younger Tank Younger, (1928-2001), football player
- Richard Wayne Penniman, Little Richard (1932-2020), musician, singer, and songwriter
- John Roseboro (1933-2002), baseball player and coach
- Larry McCormick (1937-2004), actor, reporter and news anchor
- John Mack (1937-2018), L.A. Urban League president
- Mahdi Abdul-Rahman, Walt Hazzard (1942-2011), basketball player and coach

== See also ==
- List of districts and neighborhoods of Los Angeles
