= Lords of Lyrics =

American hip hop duo

- L.O.L. performing during video Shoot in Houston, TX - March 28, 2009

Background information
- Also known as: L.O.L.
- Origin: Los Angeles, California; Houston, Texas
- Genres: Hip hop, West Coast hip hop, G-Funk
- Years active: 1989–Present
- Labels: LynnByrd Music, Franchise Records
- Members: "JP"; Koop
- Past members: DJ Marq; Damon "Twin" Rose
- Website: http://www.lordsoflyrics.com

Lords of Lyrics, better known as “L.O.L.", is an American West Coast hip hop duo that consists of Jerry L. Polidore and J.K. Jackson, a.k.a. "JP" and Young Koop. The Los Angeles–based group was formed in 1992.

== History ==
Group member Young Koop (formerly known as Shawn) is a native of South Central Los Angeles, while JP (formerly known as Swan), born in Houston, TX, but lived his teenage years in Los Angeles. The Duo met and started rapping together during high school where they became popular for entertaining students with rap performances during lunch hour, while attending University High School. Just after High School, JP and Koop formed L.O.L.. Members, Damon "Twin" Rose and DJ Marq, joined the group a shortly afterward.

In their early years, L.O.L. was known to frequently perform at Los Angeles's The Good Life Cafe's Thursday night open-mic Underground Hip Hop scene, that was located on Crenshaw Boulevard.

By 1994, L.O.L. emerged from the underground rap scene, performing with the likes of Cypress Hill, Too Short, Mobb Deep, Xzibit. Their first album debuted in August 1994, titled "Do or Die", produced by Damon "Twin" Rose, while signed to Pyramid Records/Wilbro Records. During that time they fought to keep their careers alive through a shady record deal and faulty management.

In 1996, L.O.L. was picked up by Franchise Records, where their second full-length studio album, "Heaven or Hell" was released. The album was produced by DJ Slip from Compton's Most Wanted and NBA superstar, Stanley Roberts, then center for the Los Angeles Clippers and CEO of Franchise Records.

Although the group hasn't seen an abundant amount of commercial success in the U.S., they have a strong international fan-base, and are best known for their "Heaven or Hell" album, which is now considered a classic G-Funk album. "Heaven or Hell" contains the popular single, "Summer Breeze", and for "Boom Boom Crack", featured in the 1996 Hollywood movie, and on the Soundtrack of "The Last Days of Frankie the Fly". After a short stint with Franchise Records, the label closed their doors, and L.O.L. group members eventually parted ways.

Original L.O.L. members, Young Koop and "J.P." have since reunited, and have released three studio albums independently. Their most recent release "Loyalty or Royalty was released on February 20, 2015.

== Discography ==
=== Albums ===
- 1994: Do or Die
- 1996: Heaven or Hell
- 2009: Lost & Found (recorded in 1998-2000)
- 2010: Redemption
- 2013: One 4 All (Young Koop)
- 2015: Loyalty or Royalty

=== Singles ===
- 1994: "Free"
- 1996: Soundtrack: The Last Days of Frankie the Fly: Song: Boom Boom Crack
- 1996: "Summer Breeze"
- 2012: "Do it Fluid (Young Koop)"
- 2013: "West Coast 4 Life"
- 2013: "We Gon' Ride"
- 2014: "Raps Like These"
- 2015: "Sip N Sunday"
- 2015: "We Gon' Ride II"
- 2017: "Why I Low Ride (Young Koop Feat. Curren$y"
