= Varnette Honeywood =

American artist (1950–2010)

- Born: Varnette Patricia Honeywood; December 27, 1950; Los Angeles, California, U.S.
- Died: September 12, 2010 (aged 59); Los Angeles, California, U.S.
- Education: Spelman College
- Years active: 1970s-2010
- Known for: Painter, writer, businesswoman

Varnette Patricia Honeywood (December 27, 1950 – September 12, 2010) was an American painter, writer, and businesswoman whose paintings and collages depicting African-American life hung on walls in interior settings for The Cosby Show after Camille and Bill Cosby had seen her art and started collecting some of her works. Her paintings also appeared on television on the Cosby Show spin-off A Different World, as well as on the TV series Amen and 227.

== Early years ==
Honeywood was born on December 27, 1950, in Los Angeles. Her parents, Stepney and Lovie Honeywood, were elementary school teachers who had come to California from Louisiana and Mississippi. Honeywood earned her undergraduate degree in art in 1972 from Spelman College in Atlanta, the first historically black female school of higher education in the United States. (She would exhibit there in 1987.) She earned her master's degree from the University of Southern California in 1974, where she majored in education.

== Career beginnings ==
As part of a community outreach program conducted by USC, Honeywood used her educational training to teach multicultural arts and crafts programs to minority children in the public schools. The time she spent visiting relatives in the South during her childhood, her college experience at Spelman and a 1977 trip to Nigeria all provided themes for her paintings.

In the 1970s, her and her sister Stephanie established the greeting-card company Black Lifestyles. They produced prints, and stationery items featuring images of Varnette's work, making it the first such company specializing in Black themes. The Honeywood sisters hoped to make Varnette's work more accessible through their company.

== Artistic style and themes ==
Honeywood is well known for her vibrant figurative works depicting African American life. Her figures, composed of flat simplified shapes are influenced by William H. Johnson. She often showed her figures in profile and exaggerated their features. Honeywood worked with acrylic paint and in collage, her collage works are reminiscent of Romare Bearden. She drew inspiration from her own community to create images of everyday African American life, with subjects ranging from family and social gatherings to church settings. Honeywood used bright colors to reflect the vibrancy and colorfulness found in African American communities.

== Hollywood art work ==
Camille Cosby discovered Honeywood's work on note cards and she and her husband Bill Cosby started collecting her works. This led to the inclusion of Honeywood's artwork, including her 1974 painting "Birthday", on the walls of the Huxtable living room on the set of The Cosby Show. She had been asked to create a painting to be included for the show's pilot and different examples of her paintings were cycled through during the show's run. She later created a mural as a backdrop for Cosby's television series Kids Say the Darndest Things, and her art appeared in the television series My Wife and Kids, Smart Guy, The Steve Harvey Show, Gullah Gullah Island, ;Golden Girls, Melrose Place, Amen, 227 and A Different World. She worked together with Bill Cosby to create the characters and illustrations in the book series Little Bill, which became the basis for the TV series of the same name. Cosby credited Honeywood with the positive depictions of African-American life in which "you can see teenagers doing homework, a family cooking a meal, girls doing their hair", rather than showing "segregation, starving and homelessness".

She was featured in the film Varnette Honeywood : a study of a young artist, in the book Contemporary Black biography. : Volume 54 (2006).

== Later life and legacy ==
Honeywood died at age 59 on September 12, 2010, in Los Angeles after fighting cancer for two years. Her family, Tiffany Allen (executive director of Cancer Research), Joyce Allen (Executive Director/President), Jennell (Vice President), and Carolyn Allen (Secretary) along with Edward Hamilton Jr and Sherice Roper started the Varnette P. Honeywood Foundation to support those who suffer from and are prone to having reproductive cancers. Varnette P. Honeywood Foundation is inspired by the principals of fostering a sense of common ground among all people, improving the quality of life for every member of the human family, and cultivating a widespread shared commitment to creating a more enlightened society for the benefit of future generations. The Varnette P. Honeywood Foundation is focused on the following priorities: Scholarship programs for talented and promising art students and artists in all genres whose work makes a positive contribution to society.

Honeywood's artwork can still be seen on numerous show such as Amen, The Steve Harvey Show, My Wife and Kids, Smart Guy, Melrose Place, Golden Girls and various other television shows, movies and book covers. She is recognized by contemporary artists today for her significant contribution, helping to envision and shape Black visual culture.

== Publications ==
As most of Honeywood's published work was for the Little Bill book series, those with asterisks (*) designate publications not from the series.

- Shake it to the one that you love the best : play songs and lullabies from Black musical traditions, 1989*
- Let's get the rhythm of the band : a child's introduction to music from African-American culture with history and song, 1993*
- The best way to play, 1997
- The meanest thing to say, 1997
- The treasure hunt, 1997
- Money troubles, 1998
- Super-fine Valentine, 1998
- Shipwreck Saturday, 1998
- My big lie, 1999
- The worst day of my life, 1999
- Hooray for the Dandelion Warriors!, 1999
- The meanest thing to say, 1999
- One dark and scary night, 1999
- The day I was rich, 1999
- The day I saw my father cry, 2000
- "I'm late" : the story of LaNeese and Moonlight and Alisha who didn't have anyone of her own, 2006*
