= Sandra Rowe =

- Born: 1940 (age 85–86); Richmond, Indiana
- Education: California State University, Fresno
- Known for: Art such as paintings, sculptures, printmaking, installation art, artists' books

Sandra Rowe (born 1940) is a painter, sculptor, printmaker, and installation artist born in Richmond, Indiana, but active mainly in southern California. She is a retired tenured professor of art at Cal Poly Pomona.

== Education ==
Rowe earned a B.A. from California State University, Fresno (1977) and an M.F.A. from the University of California, Irvine(1980), both in studio art.

== Art and Meaning ==
The complexity and psychological and physical human identity and interrelationships- in terms of both the Self and the Self in relation to the Other is central to Sandra Rowe's art. Themes include commercialism, and consumerism; sexuality and self-identity; the paradox and psychology of male/female relationships; and conceptual issues of contemporary art. In a 1993 catalogue essay, M.A. Greenstein says, "As an African American woman, Rowe does not hesitate to expose in her artwork the eerie nakedness of racist and sexist doublespeak. She is, after all, part of a postmodern generation of artists who insist that the 'personal is the political', who claim autobiography as a code for deciphering socio-economic caste systems and who use the visual and discursive language of cultural critique to undress shoddy institutions of power...Rowe, the painter, manipulates the basic elements of visual art, especially scale, surface, and color, to heighten the emotional overtones of her analysis."

== Career ==
In 1987 she became the first Artist-in-Residence at the California African American Museum in Los Angeles, with a grant from the National Endowment for the Arts; the residency culminated in a solo exhibition in 1988. Rowe is a member of the board of directors of the California Assembly of Local Arts Agencies.
