= Carolyn Campagna Kleefeld Contemporary Art Museum =

Art museum in Long Beach, California

Coordinates: 33.7835°N 118.1147°W

The Carolyn Campagna Kleefeld Contemporary Art Museum (formerly the CSULB University Art Museum) is a contemporary art museum located on the campus of California State University, Long Beach (CSULB), which was founded in 1973. The museum received accreditation from the American Association of Museums in 1984.

The museum was renamed in 2019 following a $10 million donation from artist Carolyn Campagna Kleefeld, who also contributed 120 works to its collection. It underwent a major renovation in 2020, reopening in 2022.

== History ==
The Carolyn Campagna Klefeeld Contemporary Art Museum is located on the CSULB campus. First founded in 1973, it was previously known as the California State Long Beach University Art Museum. It received its accreditation from the American Association of Museums in 1984.

The UAM originally resided in the university's library until its closure in 1992 due to budget cuts by the university. In 1994, the founding director, Constance W. Glenn, relocated the museum to the North Campus library, now known as the Horn Center. The new location opened with shows by artists Marie-Jo Lafontaine and Howard Schatz, as well as a group exhibition featuring works by Sol Le Witt, Imi Knoebel, and Daniel Buren.

After serving for nine years, Chris Scoates stepped down from his position as the director of the UAM in 2014. Brian Trimble, previously a curator of education for the UAM, subsequently assumed the role of interim director after Scoates’ resignation.

The University Art Museum partnered with Israeli artist, Kosso Eloul, for the California International Sculpture Symposium; the university displayed many outdoor sculptures around the campus. In 2015, the Getty Conservation Institute partnered with the University Art Museum to conserve the art pieces to celebrate the 50th anniversary of the symposium.

In 2016, Kimberli Meyer, who had served as the director of the MAK Center for Art and Architecture, assumed the role of director at the UAM. Meyer was fired in 2018 following the curation of the show "American Monument" by artist, Lauren Woods, a work about police brutality perpetrated against African American men. Afterwards, Paul Baker Prindle became the new museum director in 2019, taking on the added responsibility of managing the museum's significant collections.

In 2019, Kleefeld, an artist, donated $10 million to the UAM. She later donated 120 of her artworks to the museum's permanent collection. In 2019, the CSULB University Art Museum was renamed the Carolyn Campagna Kleefeld Contemporary Art Museum. In 2020, the Carolyn Campagna Kleefeld Contemporary Art Museum underwent a $24 million renovation to expand its space. It reopened to the public on February 12, 2022.

== Notable exhibitions ==
=== The UAM Diaries: 1973 to 2004 The Glenn Years (2004) ===
The exhibition titled, "The UAM Diaries: 1973 to 2004 The Glenn Years," in 2004, paid tribute to the pivotal role played by Constance Glenn, the founding director of the University Art Museum. Reviving major exhibitions from the museum's past, the showcase highlights artworks by influential figures of the pop art movement including George Segal, Andy Warhol, David Hockney, Roy Lichtenstein, and more.

=== American MONUMENT (2018) ===
Artist Lauren Woods centered the exhibition “American MONUMENT” around the issue of police violence and the deaths of African Americans. The display comprised 25 turntables, each resonating with live sounds from cases of black Americans who died at the hands of law enforcement. The exhibition was designed as an ongoing project, with plans to incorporate new instances of police brutality as they occurred. The audio recordings varied, encompassing live readings of the incidents leading to deaths as well as readings of court transcripts. Among the recordings was audio of the police shooting of Alton Sterling, captured from police bodycam footage, and audio from a Facebook Live recording documenting the death of Philando Castile—both incidents occurring in 2016.

Following the dismissal of the museum director, Kimberli Meyers, Woods paused the installation in protest.

=== Andy Warhol: Polaroids (2023) ===
In 2008, The Andy Warhol Foundation for the Visual Arts gifted the UAM 152 of Andy Warhol's prints and polaroids from 1974–1985, including portraits of famous figures like O. J. Simpson, Dennis Hopper, and Lana Turner. In late 2023, the museum held an exhibition titled "Andy Warhol: Polaroids," where it showcased many of these polaroids as a part of Warhol's “Torsos” and “Sex Parts” series.

=== Drag Show (2023) ===
In 2023, director Paul Baker Prindle opted to curate a historical drag show in response to student interest in queer and LGBT themes, coinciding with ongoing discussions around anti-drag and anti-trans legislation. Centered on the East Side of New York City during the 1980s and 1990s, the exhibition showcased a dynamic mix of photographs, drawings, paintings, and multimedia that provided an intimate portrayal of drag performers’ everyday experiences. Among the exhibits was a quilt panel crafted by the CSULB Theater Arts Department in 1992, serving as a tribute to seven department members who passed due to AIDS-related causes. This panel has since become a part of the National AIDS Memorial.

== Controversies ==
=== Director firing ===
In an email to museum staff, then-museum director Kimberli Meyer advised addressing concerns about the exhibit based on race. While Meyer argued that this approach aimed to foster inclusivity and shield museum staff from potential criticism regarding the "American MONUMENT" exhibit, Jennifer Moran, a university employee union representative, asserted that such directives were "inappropriate."

Meyers was soon fired. As a direct result, Woods "paused" the installation as a protest. The artist believed the university wanted to pull the installation itself but knew it would receive too much backlash and instead opted to fire Meyer. However, Moran dismissed this as a misleading portrayal, stating that the staff endorsed Meyer's vision, but Meyer struggled to fully adhere to the institution's policies. Lauren Woods, nonetheless, urged the museum to undertake actions demonstrating their commitment to anti-racism through restoration efforts.

During a university-hosted forum, students and faculty expressed apprehensions regarding upper administration's grasp of the impact of the dismissal on the campus community. Moreover, many found it challenging to accept that Meyer's termination was entirely disconnected from the exhibit's content.

=== Name change ===
The museum received backlash for its name-sake following the Kleefeld's donation of $10 million. Los Angeles Times art critic Christopher Knight wrote: "A permanent chunk of a public university’s tax-subsidized museum facility and artistic program has been effectively privatized to advance the personal interests of a wealthy patron."

== Museum directors ==
- Constance W. Glenn: 1973–August 22, 2004
- Chris Scoates: 2005–2014
- Brian Trimble: 2014–2016
- Kimberli Meyer: 2016–2018
- Paul Baker Prindle: 2019–2024
