= Murder of Ennis Cosby =

1997 American murder case

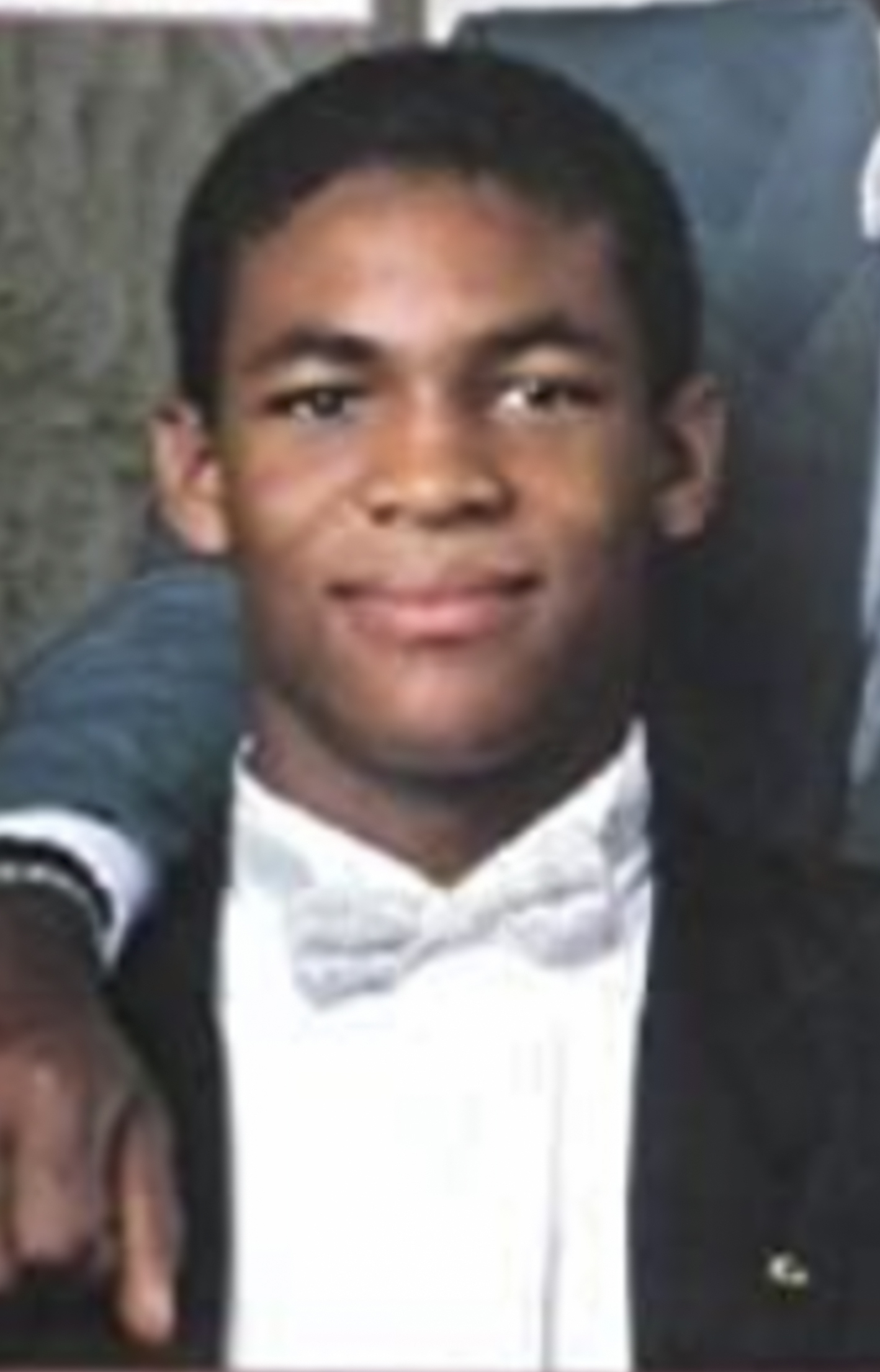
- Cosby in 1989
- Location: 34°07′29.2″N 118°28′32.7″W; Los Angeles, California, U.S.
- Date: January 16, 1997; Approx. 1 a.m. (PST)
- Attack type: Murder by shooting, attempted robbery
- Victim: Ennis William Cosby
- Perpetrator: Mikhail Markhasev
- Verdict: Guilty on both counts
- Convictions: First-degree murder; Attempted robbery
- Sentence: Life in prison without the possibility of parole, plus 10 years

Ennis William Cosby (April 15, 1969 – January 16, 1997), the only son of American comedian Bill Cosby, was murdered on January 16, 1997, near Interstate 405 in Los Angeles, California, United States. He was shot in the head by 18-year-old Mikhail Markhasev in a failed robbery attempt. Cosby was 27 years old.

Cosby's death resulted in significant media coverage, public outrage and an outpouring of support for the Cosby family. Seeking the $100,000 reward offered by the National Enquirer, an acquaintance of the shooter provided information that led to Markhasev's arrest in March 1997.

Subsequently, Markhasev was tried and convicted of first-degree murder and attempted robbery on July 7, 1998, and was sentenced to life in prison the following month. Markhasev maintained his innocence until 2001, when he admitted to committing the murder and asked that appeals in his case stop.

== Biography ==
Ennis William Cosby was born April 15, 1969, to actor and comedian Bill Cosby and his wife, Camille Cosby (née Hanks). He was their third child and only son. Cosby had four sisters: Erika (b. 1965), Erinn (b. 1966), Ensa (April 8, 1973 – February 23, 2018), and Evin (b. 1976). When Camille was about to give birth to Ennis, Bill joked during a television special: "It had better be a boy, you hear, Camille?" and Camille responded: "Right!" from offscreen.

Cosby was born at Cedars-Sinai Medical Center Los Angeles and grew up in Southern California, Pennsylvania, and New York City. He attended George School, a private boarding school outside Philadelphia, where he played football, basketball, lacrosse, and track and field. He suffered from undiagnosed dyslexia, which caused low grades and friction with his parents, both of whom had advanced educational degrees.

Ennis' childhood is a focus of his father's 1982–83 stand-up release Himself, and he is also referred to in a routine from Eddie Murphy's 1987 concert film Raw. Theo Huxtable, Bill Cosby's television son on The Cosby Show, was based on Ennis, and this was reflected in storylines with Theo struggling in school until he was diagnosed with dyslexia. It was also written into the script that Bill's character, Cliff Huxtable, had been wrong in blaming Theo for his poor grades; this mirrored Bill Cosby's real life, as he had felt guilty for thinking Ennis had struggled academically because of a character flaw.

Cosby's dyslexia was diagnosed when he entered Morehouse College in Atlanta, where a friend encouraged him to be tested. He then spent a summer semester in Putney, Vermont, undergoing intensive academic training at Landmark College, a private university established exclusively for students with learning disabilities. Cosby later returned to Morehouse, where he made the dean's list when his grade point average jumped from 2.3 to more than 3.5.

In his free time, Cosby tutored students at elementary and high schools and earned a Morehouse bachelor's degree in 1992, which he followed with a master's from Columbia University in New York in 1995. While at Columbia, he worked at Alfred E. Smith Elementary School and also tutored students struggling with learning disabilities. His friends recalled that he kept a low profile and did not want special treatment, and would just say that his father worked "in business" when asked why he had lived in three states.

Prior to his death at 27 years old, Cosby was working toward his doctorate in special education at Columbia University's Teachers College and also planned to set up a school for children with learning disabilities. He once wrote, "The happiest day of my life occurred when I found out I was dyslexic. I believe that life is finding solutions, and the worst feeling to me is confusion."

Cosby was recalled as friendly and outgoing, and he would greet people saying "Hello, friend," a greeting that became his legacy as described in the children's television show Little Bill created by his father. His parents had the phrase put on a sign near his grave, and several months after his death, Bill released a jazz collection titled Hello, Friend: To Ennis With Love.

== Murder ==
In January 1997, Cosby was in Los Angeles during the winter break from his classes at Columbia University. In the early hours of January 16, after visiting friends in the city, he was driving north on Interstate 405 through the Sepulveda Pass. At approximately 1:00 a.m. PST, he exited the freeway onto Skirball Center Drive, to attend to a flat tire on his dark green Mercedes-Benz. He called his girlfriend, Stephanie Crane, who drove to meet him. She parked behind him to light the area with her headlights, while Cosby changed the tire.

She later testified that a man came to her window and said, "Open the door or I'll kill you." Frightened, Crane drove away. After moving approximately 50 feet (15 m) away, she heard a gunshot and immediately drove back to Cosby's location. She saw a man running away and discovered Cosby lying on the ground, by the driver's side of his vehicle, lying in a pool of blood. He had been shot in the head. Although it appeared that robbery was a motive, Cosby was still wearing a Rolex watch and had $60 in his pocket.

The Los Angeles Police Department contacted Representative Maxine Waters, who was a close friend of Bill Cosby, to request his phone number. Waters declined their request, but asked another close friend of the comedian, Essence magazine publisher Ed Lewis, to inform him of his son's death. However, the police contacted the CBS studio producing his new series, Cosby, which was being filmed in New York, at Kaufman Astoria Studios in Queens. Cosby was on set when producer Joanne Curley-Kerner informed him of the death of his son. Afterwards, Los Angeles police spoke with him and discouraged him from flying to Los Angeles.

== Aftermath ==
The Cosby family received an outpouring of support from friends and the general public. Truckloads of flowers were delivered to the family's home in New York City, and strangers left flowers on the spot where the murder took place. U.S. President Bill Clinton, Vice President Al Gore, and South African Archbishop Desmond Tutu called Bill Cosby to offer condolences.

Within 36 hours of his death, the high number of calls asking how Cosby's memory could be honored prompted his family to form the Ennis William Cosby Foundation. At the time of its inception, the foundation's purpose was to benefit programs focused on those with learning disabilities.

Cosby was buried on January 19, 1997, in Shelburne, Massachusetts, after a funeral that was held at the family estate.

=== Media criticism ===
National media received criticism for its early coverage of Cosby's murder. A news helicopter from local station KTLA had captured aerial footage of Cosby lying dead on the road on January 16, and included closeups of his body. The footage was broadcast by CNN later that day. This prompted outrage from CNN viewers, who had not been warned that graphic footage was about to be shown. CNN received hundreds of calls of complaint, and anchor Bobbie Battista apologized on air for broadcasting the footage. KTLA itself had not shown the footage, as it was deemed too graphic by the station's standards.

In the hours after Cosby's death, photographers and news cameras gathered outside Bill and Camille Cosby's Manhattan home. Bill Cosby, returning home from the studio in Queens after being informed of Ennis' death, was met with a "media circus" outside his home. When pressed for quotes by reporters, Cosby said of his son, "He was my hero." The family began making plans for a burial, and chose a private funeral in Shelburne, to avoid the media.

Journalist Howard Rosenberg of the Los Angeles Times wrote, "CNN carelessly crossed a line Thursday by airing a tasteless close-up of the body of Bill Cosby's murdered son, Ennis, lying in a pool of blood... Will another line be crossed by media badgering his famous father and the rest of his grieving family for comments about his death?"

On January 18, two days after the murder, the Fox News Channel issued a statement saying its employees "will not stake out the home of actor Bill Cosby or attempt to contact any member of the Cosby family for comment about the death of Mr. Cosby's son." The family issued a statement saying, "We do not accept people coming to our homes, because this is a time we want to ourselves to find solutions to questions in our hearts."

Rosenberg also criticized Los Angeles CBS affiliate KCBS-TV for blurring out the face of the sole witness, Stephanie Crane, after they had already shown footage of her at the scene, and journalist Harvey Levin had identified her as the witness. Crane, the maternal aunt of actresses Melissa Gilbert and Sara Gilbert, went into hiding and avoided the media despite being offered "a small fortune" by tabloids to sell her story.

=== Rewards ===
Gray Davis, then Lieutenant Governor of California, announced a $50,000 reward for information leading to the arrest and conviction of Cosby's killer, which led to further media coverage and criticism for the offer of taxpayer funds as a reward. Republican Assemblyman Gary Miller called it a "transparent political stunt" by Davis, who later launched a successful bid for governor. Miller complained that the Cosby family was wealthy enough to offer its own reward, and that there were no similar rewards offered by the state to capture the killers of children of non-celebrities.

A crime victims advocacy group, the Doris Tate Crime Victims Bureau, also criticized the reward. "It's offensive," said Kelly Rudiger, executive director of the group. "There are many unsolved cases that could be solved with the incentive of cash. This has generated a lot of verbal aggression against Gray by our members. They're asking, 'Why Cosby and not Smith and Jones and Brown?'"

At the time of the murder, Davis was acting governor as Governor Pete Wilson was out of the country on a trade visit. Wilson's spokesman stated that the governor did not proactively volunteer rewards but would act only after local law enforcement requested it. On February 8, Wilson rescinded the offer Davis had made, citing the Cosby family's request that no taxpayer money be used as a reward. "The Cosby family has my heartfelt sympathy," Wilson said in a statement. "I also regret that the Cosby family has had to respond to a barrage of media attention with regards to rewards offered by the state and other entities. It is my hope that withdrawing this reward brings a close to this issue and takes a burden off the Cosby family."

A $25,000 reward from the City of Los Angeles and a $15,000 reward from Los Angeles County were similarly withdrawn following the family's request. Tabloid newspapers The Globe ($200,000) and the National Enquirer ($100,000) also offered rewards for information that were not withdrawn, with the latter being claimed by an acquaintance of the shooter who provided information that led to Markhasev's arrest in March 1997.

== Investigation and trial ==
The police stated they believed the motive to be an attempted robbery or carjacking committed by a stranger who had been drawn to Cosby's expensive Mercedes convertible. Crane described a young, slender white man, approximately 25 to 35 years of age, who was wearing a knitted cap. A composite sketch of the man was drawn and distributed to the public.

The police received more than 800 tips they were investigating, including one in January about teenager Mikhail "Michael" Markhasev. Markhasev, then 18, was born in Lviv, Soviet Ukraine, and emigrated to the United States with his mother in 1989. Markhasev was ultimately apprehended in March after the National Enquirer received information from an acquaintance of his.

Markhasev, who had previous arrests for drug possession, pleaded not guilty. Some of his friends initially stated they believed he was innocent. The grand jury convened three months after the murder. Markhasev was charged with first-degree murder and attempted robbery. As Cosby was murdered during a robbery attempt, it elevated the charge to a capital offense. Because of these special circumstances, Markhasev would be eligible for a death penalty, if convicted.

Two acquaintances of Markhasev, Sara Peters and Michael Chang, testified against him at the hearing. Peters and her boyfriend, Eli Zakaria (who refused to testify, invoking his Fifth Amendment right to not incriminate himself), were with Markhasev on the night of the murder and were high on cocaine and heroin. Peters testified they had stopped to use the pay phone at a park-and-ride lot about 450 feet (140 m) from where Cosby had pulled over to fix his flat tire. Peters testified that while Zakaria was on the phone, Markhasev walked off without saying where he was going. Within a few minutes, Peters heard a loud noise like a car backfiring, and Markhasev ran back to the car, saying, "Let's go. We've got to get out of here. Let's go." Markhasev refused to tell them what happened, but they stopped at a wooded area that matched the description of the area where the murder weapon was discovered.

Michael Chang and a friend later attempted to help Markhasev find the gun. In a statement to the grand jury Chang stated that Markhasev admitted to killing Cosby. Markhasev said that Cosby was frightened when he pulled the gun and demanded money, and that Markhasev shot Cosby because he was taking too long to give him money.

After Markhasev was indicted by the grand jury, neither Peters nor Chang testified in Markhasev's two-week trial in July 1998. From jail, Markhasev sent a letter to an acquaintance in which he admitted to the murder, writing, "I shot the nigger. I went to rob a [drug] connection and obviously found something else." Markhasev's attorneys unsuccessfully tried to argue that the letters were forged and that Zakaria was the killer. Markhasev was ultimately convicted and sentenced to life without the possibility of parole, plus an additional 10 years in prison.

== 2001 confession ==
In February 2001, Markhasev sent a letter to California Deputy Attorney General Kyle Brodie asking that all appeals in his case stop. Markhasev wrote to Brodie that he had killed Cosby and that he wanted to do the right thing by confessing. "Although my appeal is in its beginning stages, I don't want to continue with it because it's based on falsehood and deceit," wrote Markhasev, who is incarcerated at California State Prison, Corcoran. "I am guilty, and I want to do the right thing ... More than anything, I want to apologize to the victim's family. It is my duty as a Christian, and it's the least I can do, after the great wickedness for which I am responsible."
