= Leimert Park, Los Angeles =

Residential neighborhood

Leimert Park
- Neighborhood of Los Angeles
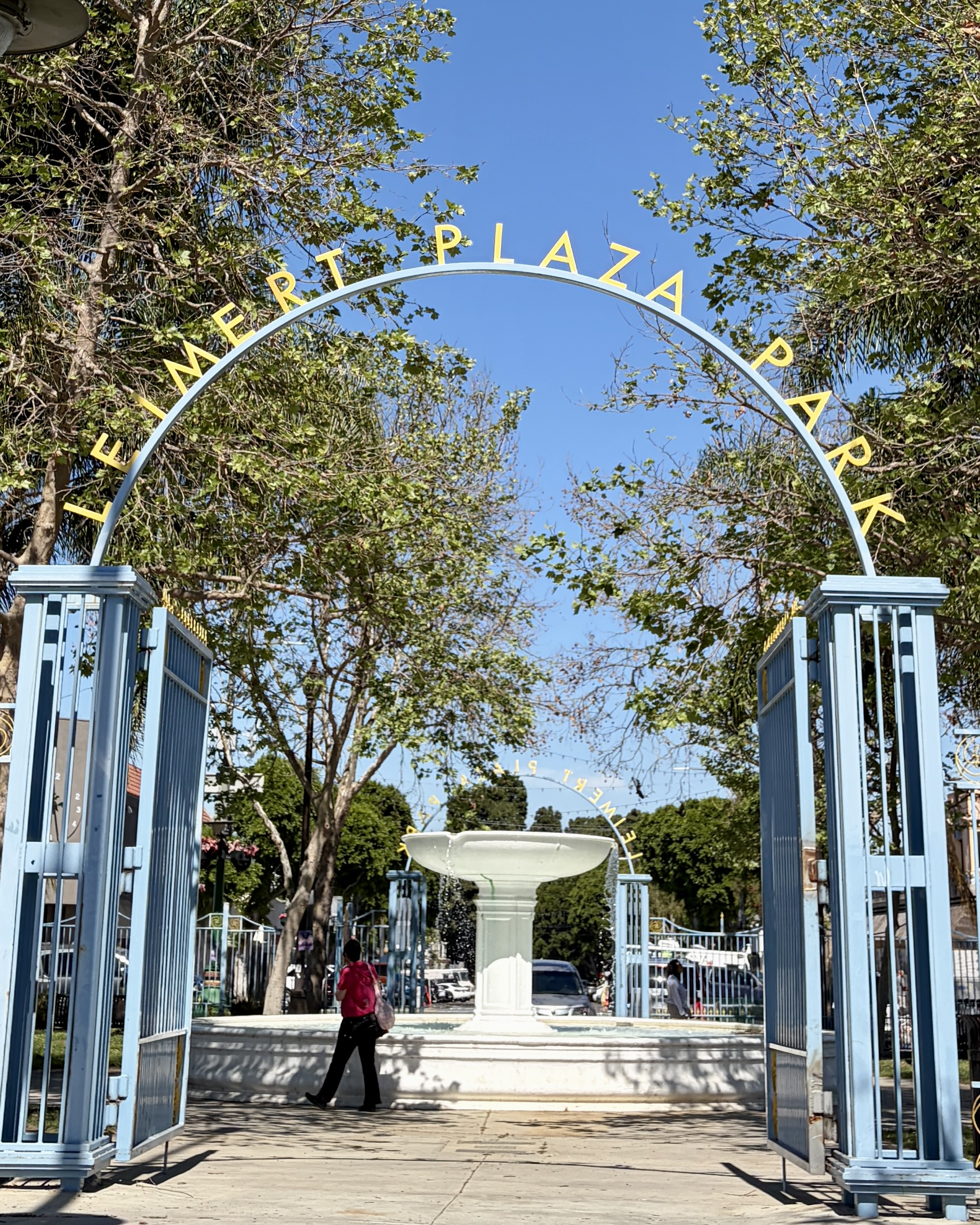
- Leimert Plaza Park

- Location within South Los Angeles
- Coordinates: 34°00′45″N 118°19′34″W
- Country: United States
- State: California
- County: Los Angeles
- City: Los Angeles
- Time zone: Pacific
- ZIP Code: 90008
- Area code: 323

Leimert Park (/ləˈmɜːrt/; lə-MURT) is a neighborhood in the South Los Angeles region of Los Angeles, California.

Developed in the 1920s as a mainly residential community, it features Spanish Colonial Revival homes and tree-lined streets. The Life Magazine/Leimert Park House is a Los Angeles Historic-Cultural Monument.

The core of Leimert Park is Leimert Park Village, which consists of Leimert Plaza Park, shops on 43rd Street and on Degnan Boulevard, and the Vision Theater. The village has become the center of both historical and contemporary African-American art, music, and culture in Los Angeles.

== History ==
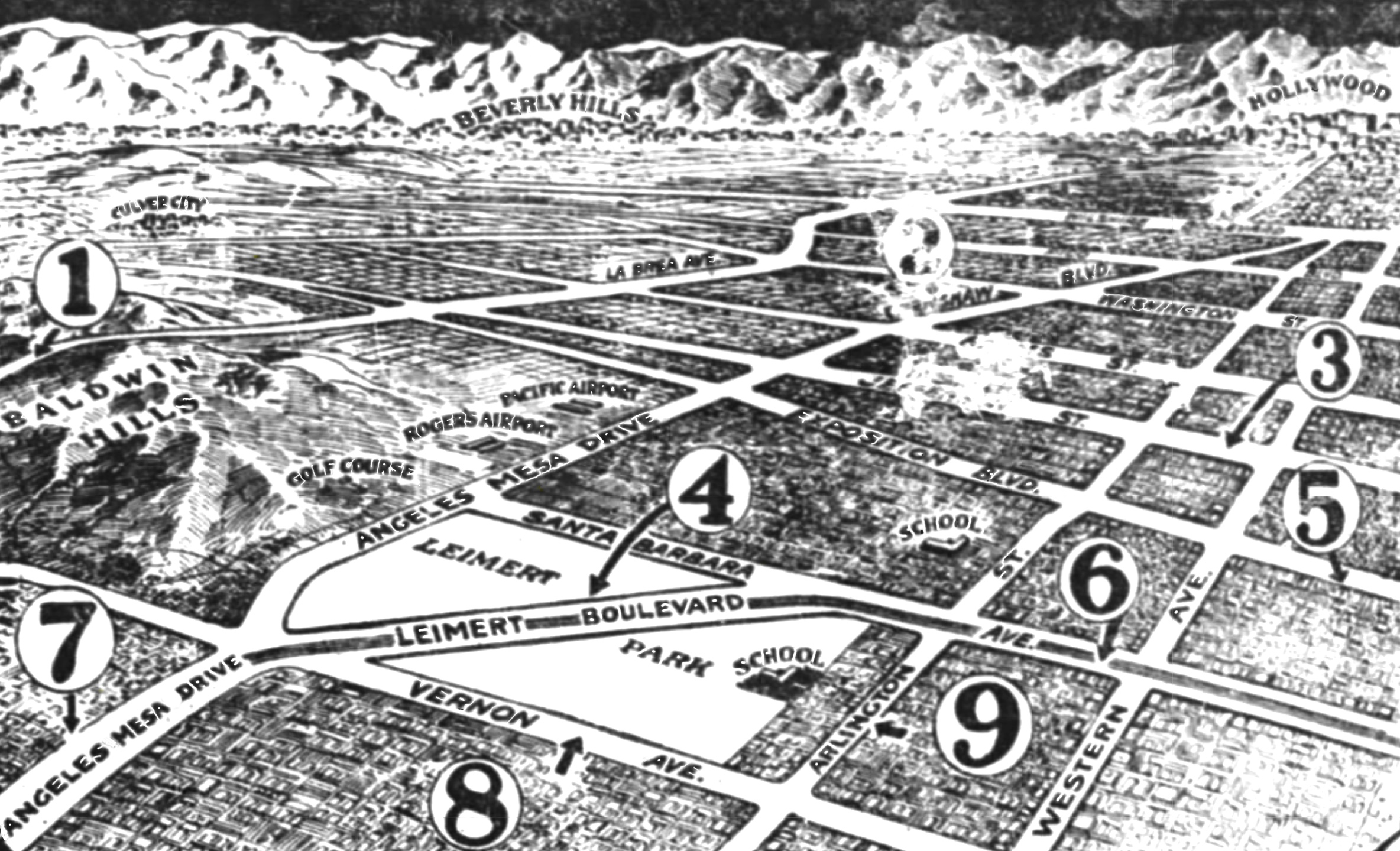
1927 Los Angeles Times map of Leimert Park and surrounding area, including (4) proposed connection of Santa Barbara Avenue (now Martin Luther King Jr. Blvd.) with Angeles Mesa Drive (now Crenshaw Boulevard) via a new 133-foot-wide Leimert Boulevard and (7) paving and widening of Angeles Mesa Drive with two roadways from Vernon south to 79th Street

Leimert Park is named for its developer, Walter H. Leimert, who began the subdivision business center project in 1928. The master plan was designed by the Olmsted Brothers company, which was managed by the sons of Frederick Law Olmsted (1822–1903), the landscape designer best known for Central Park in New York City.

Elderly Japanese-American residents still live in the area, and some of the Japanese gardens still exist. The Crenshaw Square Shopping Center was inspired and designed in the style of Japanese architecture. The center was a hub of retailing in the mid-1950s.

In 2013 and 2014, resurgent home prices in South Los Angeles spurred much interest among many young professionals into moving into Leimert Park and among other areas within the region. Observers took note with mixed feelings: fears of gentrification and hope for increased business investment. The trend continued with 2021 seeing a jump in house prices.

== Geography ==
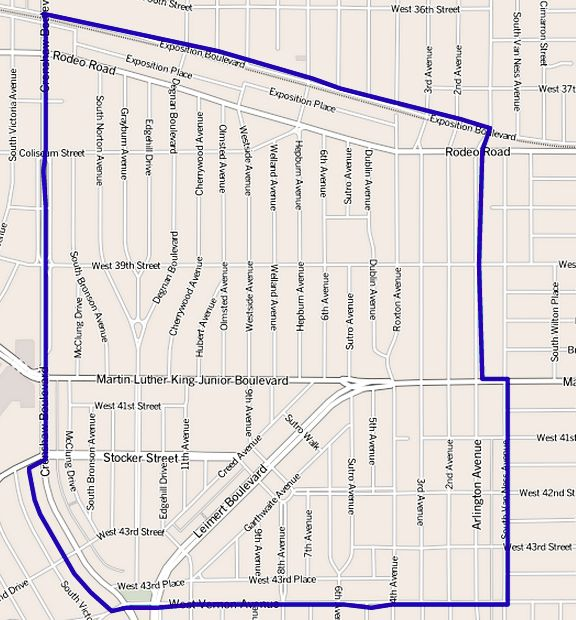
Leimert Park boundaries as mapped by the Los Angeles Times

=== Neighborhood boundaries ===
According to LAist: The boundaries are Obama Boulevard (formerly Rodeo Road) on the north, 4th Avenue and Roxton Avenue on the east, West Vernon Avenue on the south, and Crenshaw Boulevard on the west. The Crenshaw District lies to the northwest, View Park and Baldwin Hills are to the west and southwest, Vermont Square is to the east, and Jefferson Park is to the north.

According to the Los Angeles Times Mapping L.A. project: Leimert Park is bounded by Exposition Boulevard on the north, South Van Ness Avenue and Arlington Avenue on the east, West Vernon Avenue on the south, and Victoria Avenue and Crenshaw Boulevard on the west. Jefferson Park is to the north, the Exposition Park neighborhood and Vermont Square are to the east, Hyde Park to the south and View Park-Windsor Hills and Baldwin Hills/Crenshaw to the west. Leimert Park angles to the West Adams district on the northwest.

According to Google Maps: the boundaries are Exposition Boulevard on the north, Western Avenue on the east, West Vernon Avenue on the south, and Crenshaw Boulevard on the west.

According to the books "Leimert Park (Images of America)" and "Los Angeles Residential Architecture", Leimert Park was established with the following boundaries: Martin Luther King Jr. Blvd. (formerly Santa Barbara Avenue) on the north, Arlington on the east, Vernon to the south and Crenshaw Boulevard (formerly Angeles Mesa Drive) on the west.

=== Historic Leimert Park Village ===
Within the Leimert Park neighborhood lies the city-designated "Historic Leimert Park Village". On May 1, 2018, the Los Angeles City Council designated the area between the intersections at Vernon Avenue and Crenshaw Boulevard, 43rd Street and Crenshaw Boulevard, Leimert Boulevard and 43rd Street, Leimert Boulevard and Vernon Avenue, and Degnan Boulevard and 43rd Street as “Historic Leimert Park Village" and directed the Department of Transportation to erect permanent ceremonial sign(s) to this effect at these locations.

In 2005, a "Leimert Park Village" brick gateway marker was installed.

== Demographics ==
A total of 11,782 people lived in Leimert Park according to the 2000 U.S. census— counted 9,880 residents in the 1.19 square-mile neighborhood. The median age was 38. The percentage of residents aged 65 and above was among the county's highest.

Within the neighborhood, African Americans made up 79.6% of the population, with Latinos at 11.4%, Asians at 4.9%, White at 1.5%, and other races at 3.2%. El Salvador and Mexico were the most common places of birth for the 10.7% of the residents who were born abroad. This is a low percentage of foreign-born when compared with the overall city or Los Angeles County.

The median household income in 2008 dollars was $45,865, considered average for the city but low for the county. The percentage of households earning $20,000 or less was high, compared to the county at large. The average household size of 2.2 people was low for both the city and the county. Renters occupied 54.1% of the housing units, and homeowners occupied the rest.

In 2000 there were 817 families headed by single parents, or 27.7%, a rate that was high for the city and the county. There were 990 veterans, or 11.1% of the population, considered high when compared with the city overall. The percentage of veterans who served in the Vietnam War was among the county's highest.

== Arts and culture ==
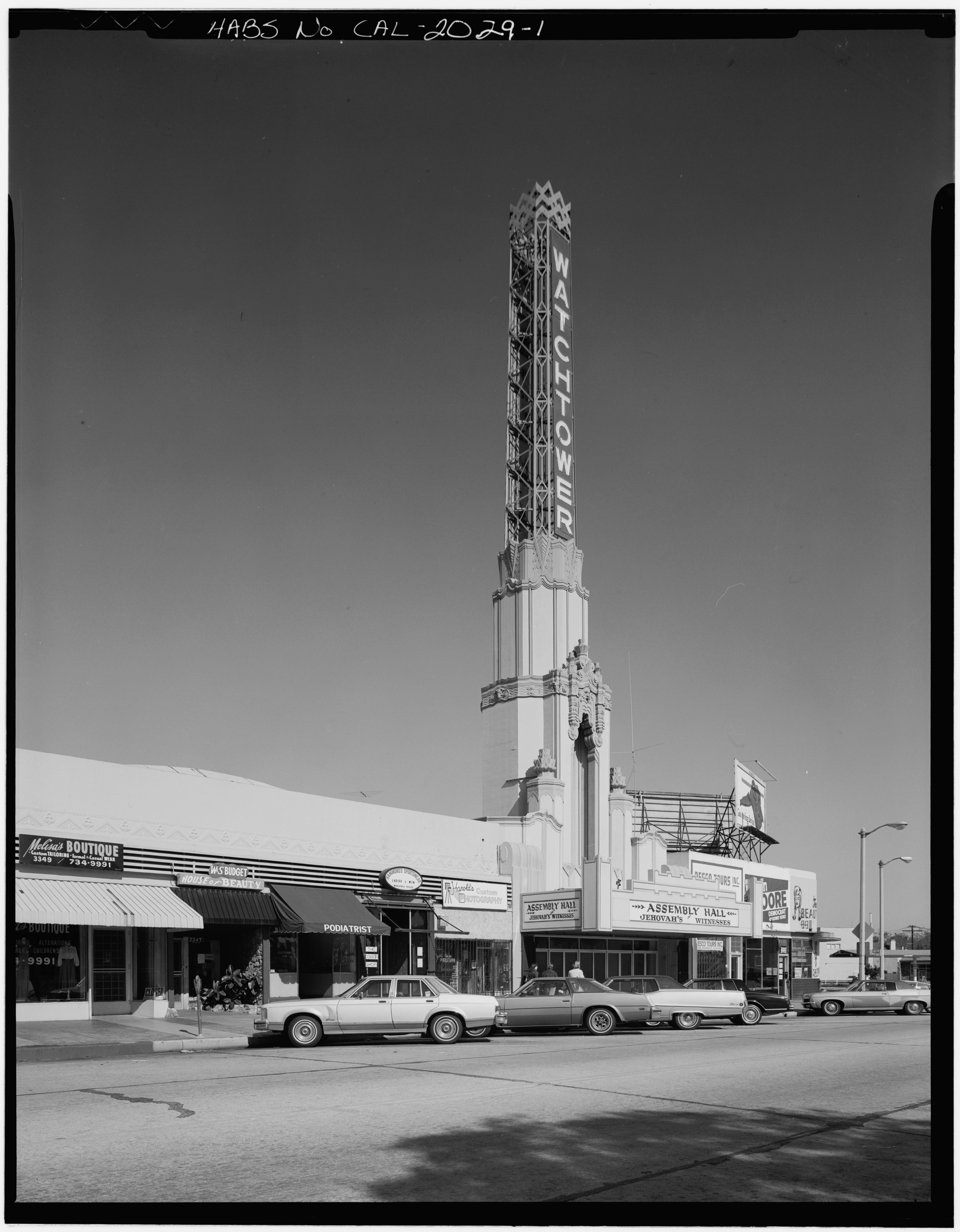
The Watchtower Assembly Hall, 1973, formerly the Leimert Theater, later the Vision Theatre

=== Leimert Park Village ===
The core of Leimert Park is Leimert Park Village, which consists of Leimert Plaza Park, two blocks of 43rd Street, and one block of Degnan Boulevard. Leimert Park Village has historically served as a hub of African-American art and culture in Los Angeles, has been compared to both Harlem and Greenwich Village, and in 1998 was seen as "the cultural heartbeat of black Los Angeles." Leimert Plaza Park was designed by the Olmsted Brothers to serve as the public hub of the master planned community. The park has been a go-to community space for the African American community since the 1980s hosting art walks, a regular drum circle, annual celebrations, rallies, protests, and memorials.

The village has blues and jazz night clubs, theaters for musicals, dramatic performances, award ceremonies, comedy specials, poetry readings, and venues for hip hop. The intersection of 43rd Street and Degnan Boulevard was dedicated as Barbara Morrison Square on the anniversary of her birth, September 10. 2022. Project Blowed is the longest-running hip hop open mic in the world, started in 1994 by rapper Aceyalone and friends. It is hosted by Kaos Network, and held every Thursday night at 43rd Place and Leimert Boulevard.

=== Vision Theatre ===
Leimert Theatre, located at the south end of Leimert Park Village at 3341 West 43rd Place, was designed in 1931 by the architectural firm Morgan, Walls & Clements and opened as a movie theater on April 21, 1932.

In 1977 the theater came under the ownership of the Jehovah's Witnesses. Actress Marla Gibbs bought the theater in 1990 and renamed it Vision Theatre, intending to make it a venue for African-American movies, live theater, and dance productions. In 1992, the Los Angeles civil unrest and an economic recession hit the area hard, and in 1997 the property fell into foreclosure. The city of Los Angeles acquired the theater in 1999.

The first phase of renovations to Vision Theatre began in 2011 and included upgrades to the lobbies, restrooms, office space, and classrooms. Rehabilitation of the remainder of the theater includes refurbishment and expansion of the theater and auditorium, and the addition of an orchestra pit and a fly loft.

=== The Leimert Park Book Fair ===
The Leimert Park Book Fair began in 2007 and attracts "more than 200 authors, poets, spoken-word artists, storytellers and other participants."

=== Destination Crenshaw ===
Sankofa Park will anchor the northern end of Destination Crenshaw, an open-air museum of African American history and culture that will extend 1.3-miles (2.1 km) down Crenshaw Boulevard through the Hyde Park neighborhood.

=== Juneteenth ===
Juneteenth is commemorated with a street festival that brings together artists and residents for a day of fun and remembrance. The event celebrates the day in 1865 when the last enslaved African Americans were liberated. The celebration in Leimert Park dates back to 1949 when a new resident started hosting a barbeque in his backyard. He was surprised that it was not a popular tradition like it was in Texas. The celebration expanded and has been organized by Black Arts Los Angeles since 2009. During the 2020 celebration, the iconography of the Black Lives Matter movement, and images of George Floyd and Breonna Taylor were part of the celebration.

== Parks and recreation ==
- Leimert Plaza Park is at 4395 Leimert Boulevard, between Vernon and 43rd Place. The park is unstaffed, with picnic tables, park bathrooms, benches, and a decorative water fountain
- People St Plaza, between the Leimert Plaza Park and the Vision Theater on 43rd Place
- Pocket Park at Degnan Boulevard, Norton Avenue and Edgehill Drive, unnamed

== Landmarks ==
- Emmanuel Danish Evangelical Lutheran Church – 4254–4260 3rd Avenue, the church is Los Angeles Historic-Cultural Monument No. 578.
- Leimert Plaza – 4395 Leimert Boulevard, designed by the Olmsted Brothers, the park is Los Angeles Historic-Cultural Monument No. 620.
- Life Magazine/Leimert Park House – 3892 Olmstead Avenue, the home is Los Angeles Historic-Cultural Monument No. 864.

== Economy ==
Tavis Smiley, host and producer of National Public Radio (NPR) and the former nationally syndicated talk show Tavis Smiley on PBS, has production studios called The Smiley Group, Inc., within the Leimert Park neighborhood.

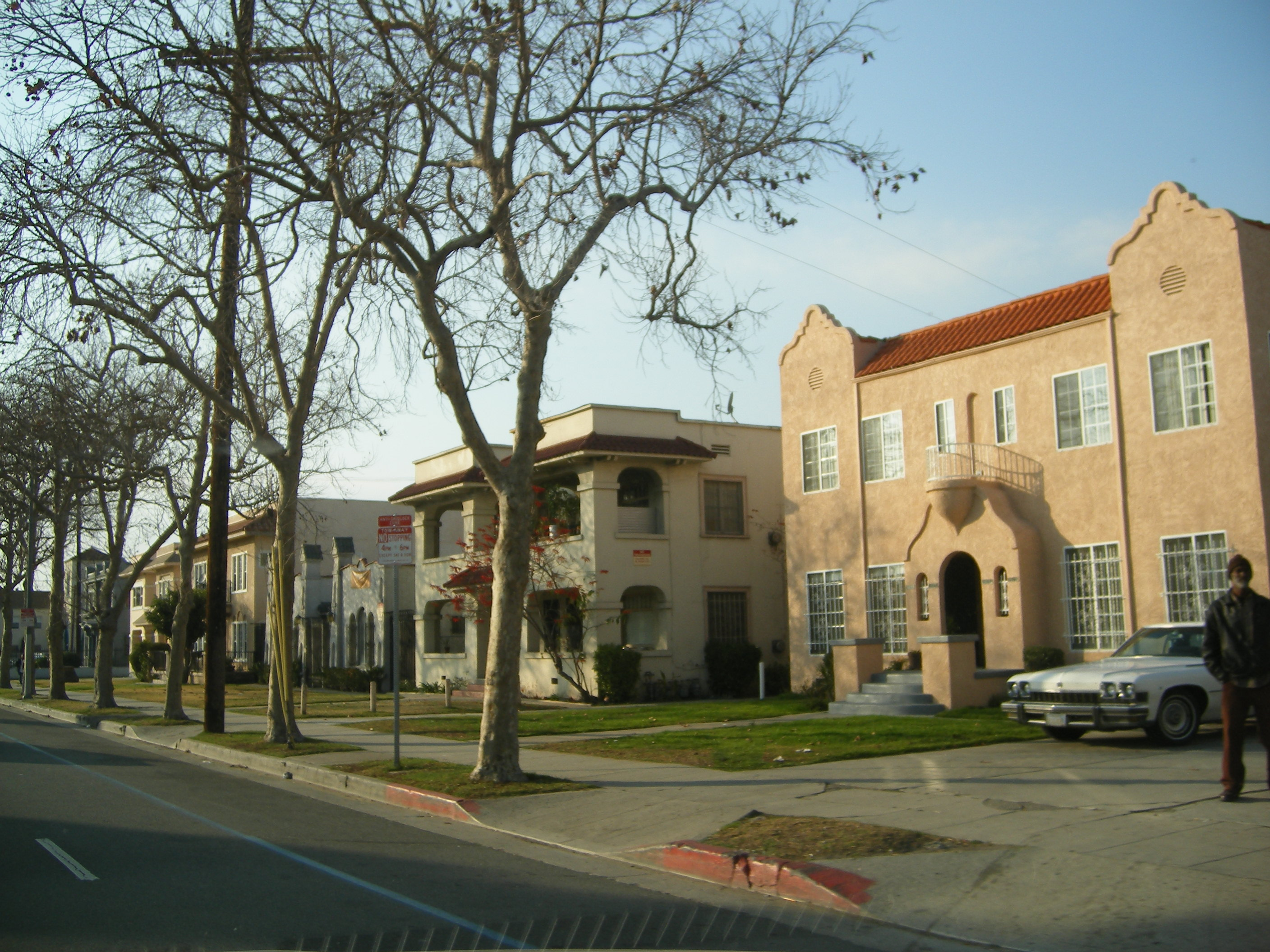
Houses and apartments along Martin Luther King Jr. Boulevard in eastern Leimert Park

== Transportation ==
On October 7, 2022, the K (Crenshaw) Line opened for service. This line of Metro has two stations at Leimert Park: Martin Luther King Jr. station at Baldwin Hills and Leimert Park and Leimert Park station.

== Education ==
Leimert Park residents aged 25 and older holding a four-year degree amounted to 55.9% of the population in 2000, about average within the city and the county. A high percentage of residents aged 25 and older had a college education.

Leimert Park is served by Los Angeles Unified School District. Within Leimert Park are the following schools:

- C.A.T.C.H High School, charter high school, 4120 11th Avenue
- Audubon Middle School, 4120 11th Avenue, LAUSD
- Tom Bradley Global Awareness Magnet, LAUSD alternative, 3875 Dublin Avenue
- New Heights Charter Elementary, 2202 West Martin Luther King Jr. Boulevard (LAUSD)
- Forty-Second Street Elementary, 4231 4th Avenue (LAUSD)

=== Other schools ===
- Libertas College Preparatory (on the Tom Bradley campus), 2875 Dublin Avenue (charter)

== Notable people ==
- Mark Bradford, artist known for grid-like abstract paintings combining collage with paints.
- Tom Bradley (1917–1998), Los Angeles mayor
- Busdriver, hip-hop artist
- Ray Charles (1930–2004), singer
- Billy Consolo (1934–2008), professional baseball player [lived at 3775 South Degnan Avenue]
- Alonzo Davis (1942–2025), artist, academic, and co-founder of the Brockman Gallery
- Ella Fitzgerald (1917–1996), singer
- Ras G, record producer and DJ
- Dom Kennedy, rapper
- Holly Mitchell, county supervisor, former State Assembly member
- Carl C. Rasmussen (1901–1952), Los Angeles City Council member

== In popular culture ==
- Leimert Park is a television comedy series on BET that premiered in 2021.
- Leimert Park After Dark, album by pianist/composer Bobby West
- Moesha is a 1996 television series on the UPN starring Brandy Norwood. The Mitchell family lived in Leimert Park.
- Insecure has highlighted community businesses. While Issa Rae is proud that the show has changed the public perception of South Los Angeles, she is concerned about gentrification.
- It is the discovery site of the "Black Dahlia" murder.
- White Men Can't Jump starring Jack Harlow and Sinqua Walls featured a scene with a major basketball tournament that was filmed in Leimert Park Village.
- Creed III (2023). Directed and starring Michael B. Jordan by MGM and Warner Bros.
- Collateral (2004). Directed by Michael Mann starring Jamie Foxx and Tom Cruise; the Jazz Club scene where Vincent has Max take him so he can assassinate jazz club owner Daniel, who is set to testify against Vincent's client.
- Beauty Shop
- Snowfall (2017–2023); TV series created by John Singleton starring Damson Idris
- You People (2023); directed by Kenya Barris

== See also ==
- History of African Americans in Los Angeles
- List of districts and neighborhoods in Los Angeles
