= Marlton =

Marlton can refer to some locations in the United States:

- Marlton, Maryland, a census-designated place
- Marlton, New Jersey, a census-designated place
- Marlton, Camden, a neighborhood in Camden, New Jersey
- Marlton, Winnipeg, a neighbourhood
- Marlton Square, future medical facility
- Marlton School, a school in Los Angeles for deaf and hard of hearing students
