= Crenshaw Manor, Los Angeles =

- Neighborhood of Los Angeles
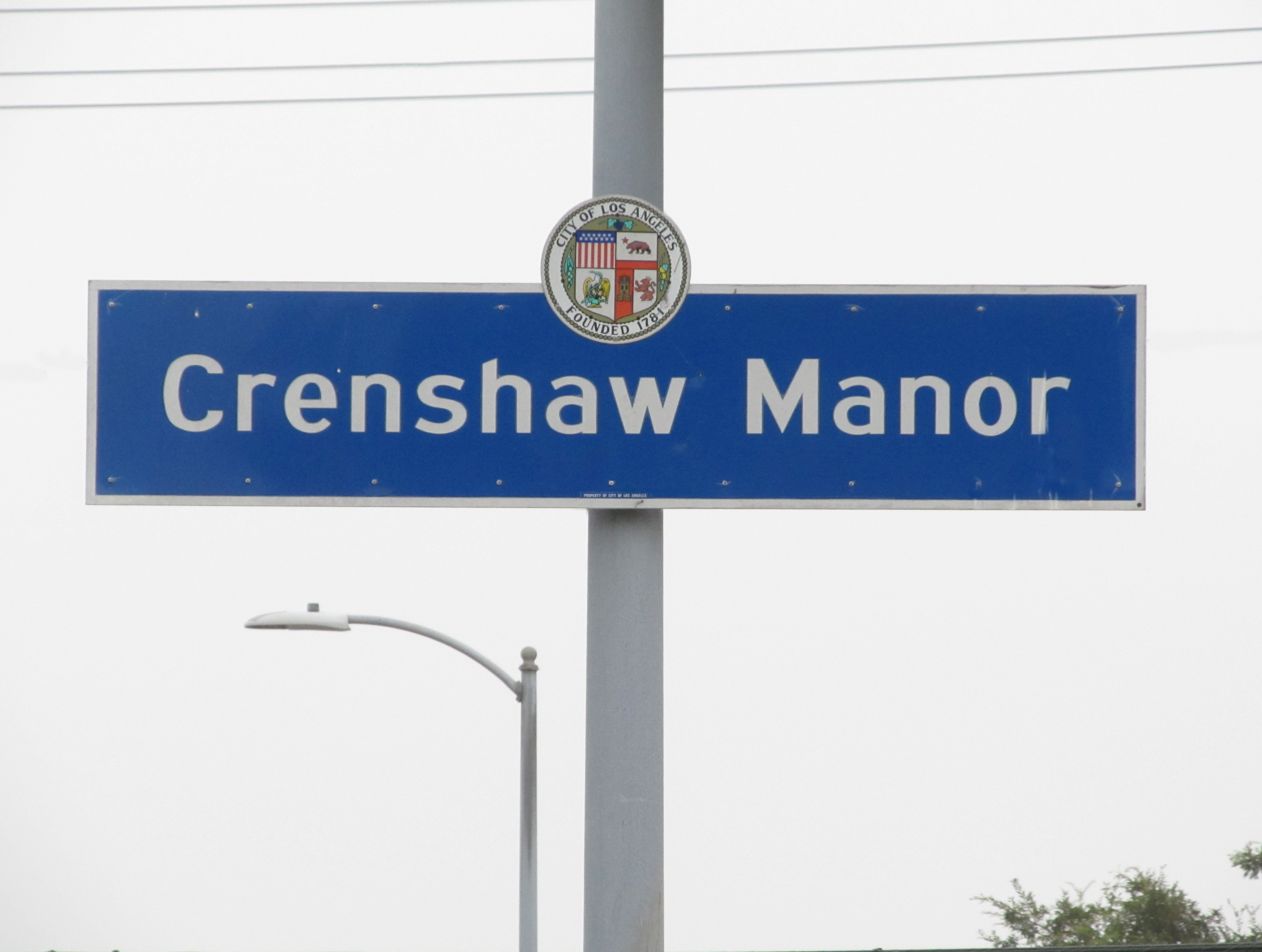
- Crenshaw Manor neighborhood sign located at the intersection of Crenshaw and Obama Boulevards

- Central Los Angeles
- Coordinates: 34°01′05″N 118°20′35″W
- Country: United States
- State: California
- County: Los Angeles
- Time zone: Pacific
- Zip Code: 90008, 90016
- Area code: 323

Crenshaw Manor is a neighborhood in Los Angeles, California.

== Geography ==
By city council action in October 2001 (C.F. #01-1874), "Crenshaw Manor" was officially named and designated as being bounded by the following streets: Exposition Boulevard on the north, Crenshaw Boulevard on the west, Chesapeake Avenue on the east, and Martin Luther King Boulevard on the south.

The Department of Transportation was instructed to install signage in the general vicinity of the above-mentioned locations and remove any existing City of Los Angeles signs in those areas and replace them with signs designating the newly adopted boundaries.

== History ==
Crenshaw Manor was first developed in 1942 as a way to serve WWII defense workers and their families. The development was located on the west side of Crenshaw Boulevard from Coliseum Street to Santa Barbara Avenue. Crenshaw Manor was described as having "accessibility to an excellent neighborhood shopping district, schools, transportation and recreation". The name Crenshaw Manor remained in use from the 1950s, through the 1990s.

Beginning in 2000, the Eighth District Empowerment Congress began working on the "Naming Neighborhoods Project" to identify and name the communities with the neighborhood council area. The first focus group was held at Hebrew Union College in June 2000. Through research, a meeting with an urban historian, and numerous community meetings, the Empowerment Congress ultimately outlined sixteen unique neighborhoods, including the neighborhood of Crenshaw Manor. The names were submitted to City Council in October 2001 and approved in February 2002.

Because the neighborhood is within two different council districts, a motion was made in November 2002 to "delete" the area named as Crenshaw Manor.

In November 2004, citing that "the stakeholders in the area have continued to express their support of the designation of Crenshaw Manor", the motion was amended and the designation of Crenshaw Manor was restored.

In 2014, the Los Angeles Times reported that neighborhoods within the Crenshaw area were experiencing soaring home prices as young professionals were purchasing homes in the community and new shops and restaurants were opening up.

== Landmarks and attractions ==
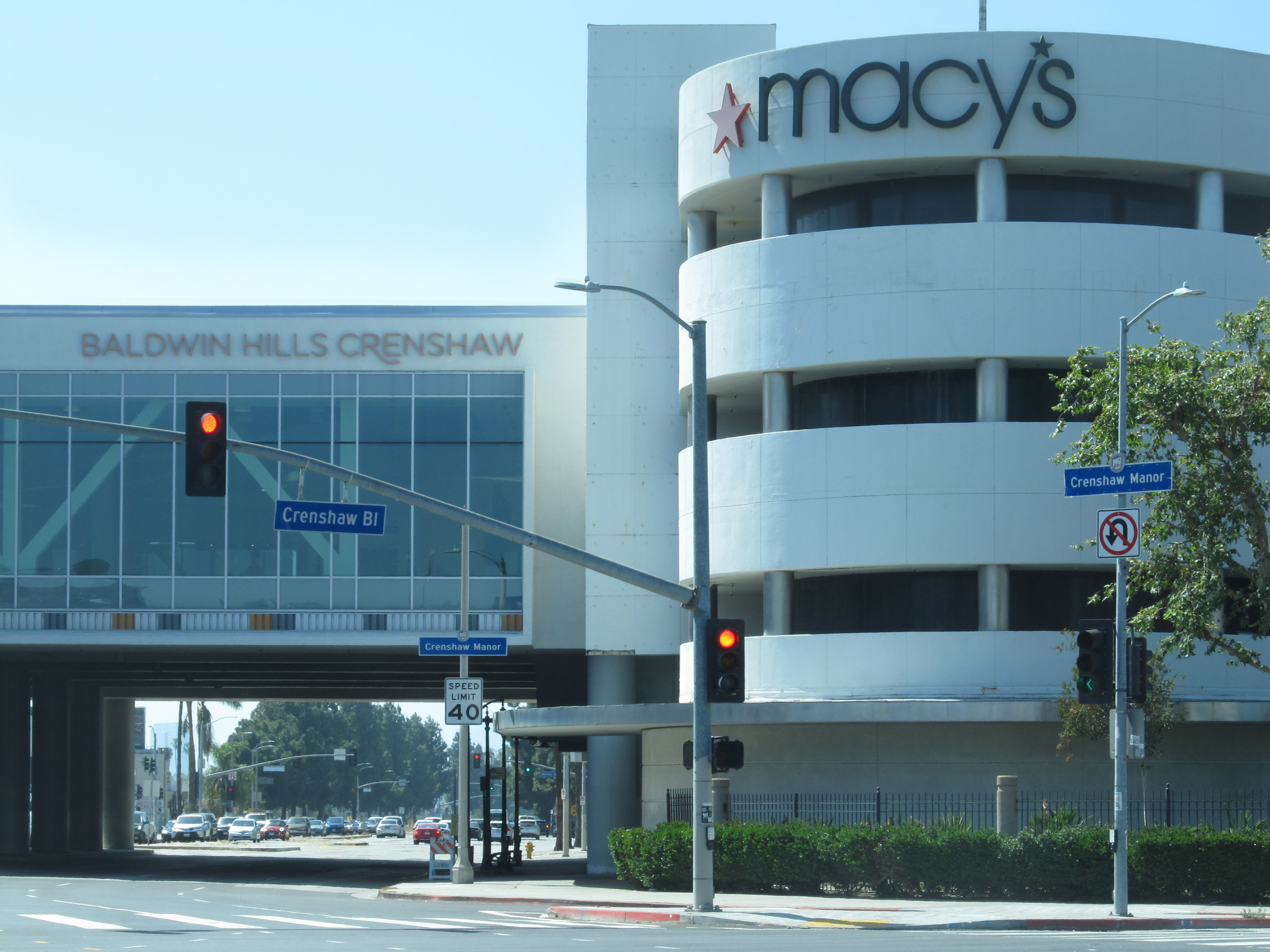
Baldwin Hills Crenshaw Plaza with Crenshaw Manor signage in front

- Baldwin Hills Crenshaw Plaza - An indoor shopping mall complex. The Macy's building opened in 1947 as the May Company. Crenshaw Manor signage is installed in front of the building on both Crenshaw Boulevard and on Martin Luther King Jr. Boulevard.

== Government ==
=== Council district ===
Crenshaw Manor lies mostly within Los Angeles City Council District 10, while the northwest intersection of Crenshaw Boulevard and Martin Luther King, Jr. Ave is in Council District 8.

=== Neighborhood council ===
Per official neighborhood council maps, the section of Crenshaw Manor south of Coliseum Boulevard is served by the Empowerment Congress West Neighborhood Council. Crenshaw Manor north of Coliseum Boulevard is served by the West Adams Neighborhood Council.

== Fire service ==
The Los Angeles Fire Department operates one station which is located within the boundaries of Crenshaw Manor:

- Los Angeles Fire Dept. Station 94 - 4470 Coliseum Street

== Education ==
Two public schools are located within the boundaries of Crenshaw Manor:

- Coliseum Street Elementary School, LAUSD, 4400 Coliseum Street
- Stella Middle Charter Academy, federally funded public charter school, 4301 W. Martin Luther King Jr. Blvd.

== Transportation ==
Crenshaw Manor is served by both the Metro E Line and the Metro K Line, with stations at the north and south ends of the neighborhood. It is also served by the LADOT Dash Bus shuttle service.

== See also ==
- Map of Crenshaw Manor
- A Los Angeles Sentinel story about Crenshaw Manor
