= Baldwin Hills Dam disaster =

1963 dam failure in Los Angeles, California

Coordinates: 34.0082°N 118.3636°W

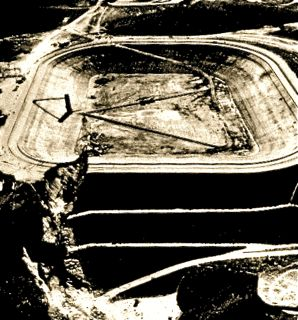
Baldwin Hills Reservoir after 1963 failure, view south. The gash through the dam corresponds to the alignment of a fault.

The Baldwin Hills Dam disaster occurred on December 14, 1963 in the Baldwin Hills neighborhood of South Los Angeles, when the dam containing the Baldwin Hills Reservoir suffered a catastrophic failure and flooded the residential neighborhoods surrounding it.

It began with signs of lining failure, followed by increasingly serious leakage through the dam at its east abutment. After three hours, the dam breached, and "it took only 77 minutes for all the water to pour out into Cloverdale Avenue, La Brea Avenue, La Cienega and Jefferson Boulevard." The collapse resulted in a release of 290 million US gallons (1,100,000 m^{3}), causing five deaths and the destruction of 277 homes. Damage totaled $12 million and the disaster caused a water shortage for 500,000 people. Some 16,000 people lived in the flooded area. Vigorous rescue efforts averted a greater loss of life.

The reservoir was constructed on a low hilltop between 1947 (79 years ago) and 1951 (75 years ago) by the Los Angeles Department of Water and Power, directly on an active fault line, which was subsidiary to the well-known nearby Newport–Inglewood Fault. The underlying geologic strata were considered unstable for a reservoir, and the design called for a compacted soil lining meant to prevent seepage into the foundation. The fault lines were considered during planning, but were deemed by some, although not all, of the engineers and geologists involved as not significant.

The former reservoir is now part of the Kenneth Hahn State Recreation Area. A plaque was placed at the site on the 50th anniversary of the disaster in 2013.

== Fatalities ==
The five fatalities were Hattie Schwartz, Maurice Clifton Carroll, Arch Young, Orra G. Strathearn, and Archie V. MacDonald.

- Strathearn, 70, was a legal secretary whose employer reported her missing
- MacDonald, 70, was executive director of the Los Angeles Furniture Mart. “A pair of glasses found Sunday in Ballona Creek by a Culver City youth were identified by McDonald’s eye doctor as his.”
- Schwartz, 73, was a resident of Village Green, she was found in her car in a ditch near Rodeo and La Brea
- Maurice Clifton Carroll, 60, was also a resident of Village Green; his body was found several blocks away
- Arch Young, 58, of Village Green was found in a pile of rubble about 1200 meters from his home

== Significance and diagnoses of the failure ==
The failure of the Baldwin Hills Reservoir received an exceptional amount of attention from the civil engineering community and remains the subject of continuing interest. The reservoir had been conceived, designed, and built during and after World War II, a time when the pace of dam building was accelerating even as some disastrous dam failures were occurring, indicating a need for safer technologies. The builder of the Baldwin Hills dam, the Los Angeles Department of Water and Power, was aware of the difficult geologic conditions presented by the site and knew from past experiences, notably the catastrophic failure of the St. Francis Dam in 1928 in which over 400 people lost their lives, the serious consequences of a failure, even of a small reservoir in an urban setting. While dams were recognized as potentially dangerous, like nuclear technologies, they were also considered by Americans as a showcase technology—a means of fending off danger and spreading progressive American technologies and associated social benefits at home and abroad.

The Baldwin Hills dam designer, engineer Ralph Proctor, had also worked as an assistant civil engineer for the Los Angeles Department of Water and Power on the failed St. Francis Dam, and had subsequently devised new methods of producing compacted earth fill in building its replacement. Proctor aggressively proceeded with the Baldwin Hills project, even in the face of safety concerns and disagreements over important design details raised within his own department.

The Baldwin Hills Reservoir had been built to assure an ample supply of safe water for the people of Los Angeles in case of a catastrophe such as an earthquake, fire, or war, and its failure was a blow to engineering confidence and the subject of many writings and two professional conferences (1972 and 1987).

The design and construction of the dam had been inspected and approved by the California Department of Water Resources. A meticulously documented study published by that agency in 1964—while pointing out various connections between oilfield operations in the Inglewood Oil Field and ground disturbances in the area, including beneath the reservoir and at some distance from the reservoir—concluded rather vaguely that the failure was due to "an unfortunate combination of physical factors."

The monetary damages resulting from the failure were large, and some of the investigations that followed the state study were sponsored by litigants seeking more specific conclusions relevant to legal liability. This drew attention to oilfield operations in the area. From the outset, the ground faulting and fault creep which destroyed the reservoir were probably related to the many feet of ground subsidence that had occurred a half mile west of the reservoir over decades of oil extraction in the Inglewood field. The oilfield-related subsidence in the Inglewood field, though generally denied by the oil companies as a legal policy, was documented exhaustively by the US Geological Survey in 1969. Subsidence following oil extraction from shallow deposits in unconsolidated sediments had been understood by oil industry experts since the 1920s.

Following the discovery in 1970 by geologist Douglas Hamilton of faulting and surface seepage of oilfield waste brines along the fault, which traversed and extended south of the reservoir, Hamilton and Meehan concluded that oilfield injection for waste disposal and improved recovery of oil, a new technology at the time, was a significant cause of the failure, triggering hydraulic fracturing and aggravating movements on a fault traversing the reservoir even on the day of the failure. Subsequently, the US Geological Survey concluded in 1976 that displacements at the ground surface causing reservoir failure and ground cracking in the Stocker-LaBrea area southeast of the reservoir were 90% or more attributable to exploitation of the Inglewood oil field, and that this faulting was likely aggravated by water flooding with pressures exceeding hydraulic fracturing levels.

Engineer Thomas Leps, who had served as consultant on the 1964 state investigation, took on a role as neutral reviewer in a 1972 study and most subsequent American studies of the failure. Leps concluded that about 7 inches of offset had occurred on the fault beneath the reservoir during its life, about 2 inches of which had occurred in the months just before the failure. Leps associated the latter with repressurization of the oilfield. This, along with stretching of the ground due to subsidence of about 12 feet from oil extraction, had caused the lining failure that doomed the reservoir.

Some prominent consultants, including those on a team led by Arthur Casagrande from Harvard, held that oilfield operations were not a significant influence at all, but that the failure was the result of defective siting and design with the heavy weight of the dam and reservoir being the significant cause of the fatal foundation movement. This view exonerated the oil companies, namely Standard Oil, which had sponsored Casagrande's study. Casagrande refused to acknowledge any ground movements in the area as being related to oilfield operations and argued that ground movements that affected the dam were found only beneath the reservoir, not in adjoining areas.

Most of these questions were examined once again in 1986 following investigations of a suspiciously similar major failure of the Bureau of Reclamation's Teton Dam in June 1976, and a near failure of the Department of Water and Power's Lower Van Norman Dam in the 1971 San Fernando earthquake. Professor Ronald Scott of Caltech, who had participated in the Casagrande studies, noted at a follow-up 1987 conference on Baldwin Hills that Casagrande had ignored or been unaware of ground movements clearly unrelated to the reservoir (e.g. those at Stocker-LaBrea) in his analysis. Another engineer, Stanley Wilson—who had also worked with Casagrande on the 1972 studies and supported the claim that oilfield subsidence was an insignificant cause—now conceded that analogous ground offsets extended well outside the reservoir area, notably in the Stocker-LaBrea area, so that the reservoir and other fault movements could not be attributed to the reservoir itself—thus tacitly attributing responsibility for the failure to oilfield operations. Hence, the opinions on the role of oilfield subsidence and repressurization appeared to converge.

Fluid withdrawal (pink)-injection (purple) model of fault movement and Baldwin Hills Dam failure: Injection pressures exceeded hydrofracture pressures and the recorded timing of the fault offset support the injection as being the decisive factor.

The issue of oilfield causation was a central theme in most of these discussions, with little attention having been directed to the details of the failure. The absolute necessity of a lining for this site was generally taken for granted in these proceedings even as it had been by Proctor himself, regardless of the fact that almost all earth dams perform satisfactorily without linings. Some suggestions as to possible preventive design and construction techniques that might have made the dam safer were raised to engineering consensus and reached a state of textbook knowledge in the late 1980s. For example, the character of the compacted earth lining (which had been regularly referred to as clay, but must have been substantially silt and sand, having been derived from the local Inglewood formation) was raised, if obliquely, in the suggestion made in the end that improved performance might have come from the use of a different lining material.

In 2001, a new angle on failure analysis was introduced by Mahunthan and Schofield, who concluded that overcompaction of the dam fill and lining was a significant aggravating factor in both the Baldwin Hills and Teton failures. This assertion was based on Schofield's concepts of critical-state soil mechanics, a corollary of which was that heavily compacted but lightly confined soils could be dangerously unstable where seepage forces were present. This issue had not been raised in the previous American-dominated discussions and remains in some degree contrary to American ideas in both theoretical soil mechanics and practical geotechnical engineering. In fact, the 1964 DWR failure study implied that heavy compaction was a favored technique for earth dam construction, and this assumption appeared not to have been reexamined over the 25 years of post-failure investigation and discussion.

The failure of the reservoir has been a subject of ongoing interest in the field of dam-breach studies. A recent study examined the dam failure as a two-stage process and succeeded in modeling the flood in the urban area downstream.

Although the Baldwin Hills Reservoir site has now been dedicated as a community park, and no further significant hazard is associated with ground movements there, the associated faults to the southeast (Stocker-LaBrea and the Windsor School area) continue to move significantly as of 2012, causing damage to private and public facilities. The current oilfield operator, Plains Exploration and Production Company (PXP), which has intensified production and development efforts in the oilfield with the rising price of petroleum, does not, unlike its predecessor Standard Oil, acknowledge any causal connection between fault movements and oilfield activities, and has retained a team of consultants who support this position or conclude that the causes of the movements are unknown.

The role of shallow hydraulic fracturing, which has recently been introduced as a means of stimulating production at depths around 2,000 feet (600 m) in the southeast part of the Inglewood field, and at greater depths elsewhere in the field, has also generated public concern and controversy. However, oil operators, while admitting that fracture pressures are being exceeded, refuse to acknowledge a relationship between injection at fracturing pressure levels and fault movement. The PXP and PXP consultant conclusions, that adverse effects are either unknown or not present, are disputed by other reviewers.

Recent discharges of oilfield gases in the Baldwin Hills may also be related to raised pressures resulting from injection, and may be of similar origin as the gas problems in the nearby Salt Lake field.

== Media coverage ==
KTLA used a helicopter to cover the disaster. Richard N. Levine, a 17-year-old photography student, rushed to a higher viewpoint and made 35-mm pictures of the evolving dam break.

== See also ==
- List of lakes in California
