= Marlton Square =

- Neighborhood of Los Angeles
- Country: United States
- State: California
- County: Los Angeles
- City: Los Angeles
- Time zone: Pacific
- Area code: 323

Marlton Square is a one-block medical facility, retail and residential portion of Marlton Ave, located in the Baldwin Village neighborhood in the city of Los Angeles, California. It is bordered by Martin Luther King Jr Blvd on the north, Marlton Ave on the east, Santa Rosalia Dr on the south, Angeles Vista Blvd on the southeast, Thrive Dr on the southwest and Buckingham Road on the west. Across from the medical facility is the Baldwin Hills Crenshaw Plaza shopping mall.

== History ==
=== Santa Barbara Plaza ===
Marlton Square was created and built in the early 1950s as a retail strip mall. It was then known as Santa Barbara Plaza due do the fact it was on Santa Barbara Avenue before it was changed to Martin Luther King Jr. Blvd.

In 2003, local developers broke ground in the first phase of the 22-acre (89,000 m^{2}) Marlton Square redevelopment project. This phase involved constructing the Buckingham Place Senior Retirement Community project, a 180-unit apartment complex, that is adjacent to the Baldwin Villa Plaza senior housing complex and shopping mall. The project was scheduled to be completed in spring of 2004. Several million dollars of public and private funding were awarded to the project. Although the redevelopment project began with concerns of political favoritism, it was billed as "the catalytic project for the Baldwin Hills, Crenshaw communities", and a lynchpin development project for the entire area.

While initially promising, financial difficulties and other problems quickly beset the project. Capital Vision Equities' first check to the city bounced in 2001 and the testimony of whistle-blowers lead to an audit by the Ethics Commission early on in the project. Ultimately these problems overwhelmed the developer, and amid complaints of mismanagement the redevelopment of Marlton Square has stalled in bankruptcy. Several other agencies have been involved with the development project, including Keyshawn Capital Development, which is owned and operated by former NFL wide receiver Keyshawn Johnson. The old retail stores were demolished in May 2011 to make way for future development.

By the end of 2009 Buckingham Place was largely finished but had remained unopened due to bankruptcy. In early 2012 Buckingham Place housing complex opened.

=== Mixed-Use Development ===
A 100,000-square-foot Kaiser Permanente medical facility office building (9,300 m^{2}) opened on September 7, 2017. The facility has a two-mile walking path and outdoor plaza. A new outdoor mixed-use center complex along with new dining, a grocery store, office space and shopping venues are also being planned to be built by private developers. In 2022, the city request for proposals process selected Hudson Pacific Properties to enter into an exclusive negotiation agreement to develop the project.

== Transportation ==
The Martin Luther King Jr. station provides access to the Kaiser Permanente medical facility, the Crenshaw Medical Arts Centre clinic office building, the future Stocker Street Creative soundstage studio complex and the Baldwin Hills Crenshaw Plaza via the Metro K Line.
