= Baldwin Hills, Los Angeles =

Baldwin Hills
- Neighborhood
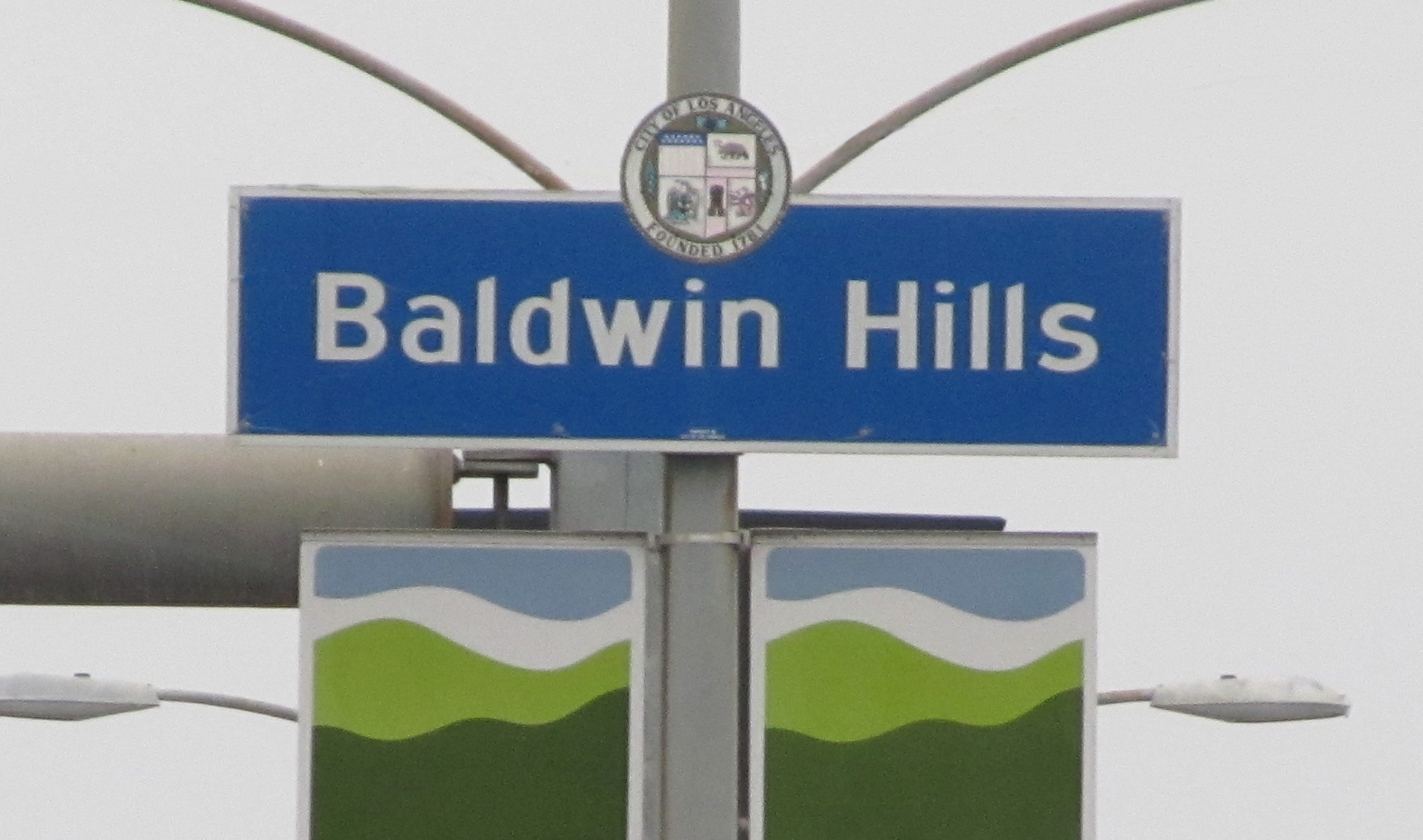
- Baldwin Hills neighborhood sign located at the intersection of La Brea Avenue and Stocker Street

- Location within Los Angeles
- Coordinates: 34°00′47″N 118°21′25″W
- Country: United States
- State: California
- County: Los Angeles
- City: Los Angeles
- Time zone: Pacific
- ZIP Code: 90008
- Area code: 323

Baldwin Hills is a neighborhood within the south region of Los Angeles, California, United States.

Often referred to as the "Black Beverly Hills", Baldwin Hills is home to Kenneth Hahn State Regional Park and Village Green, a National Historic Landmark.

== History ==
=== 19th century ===
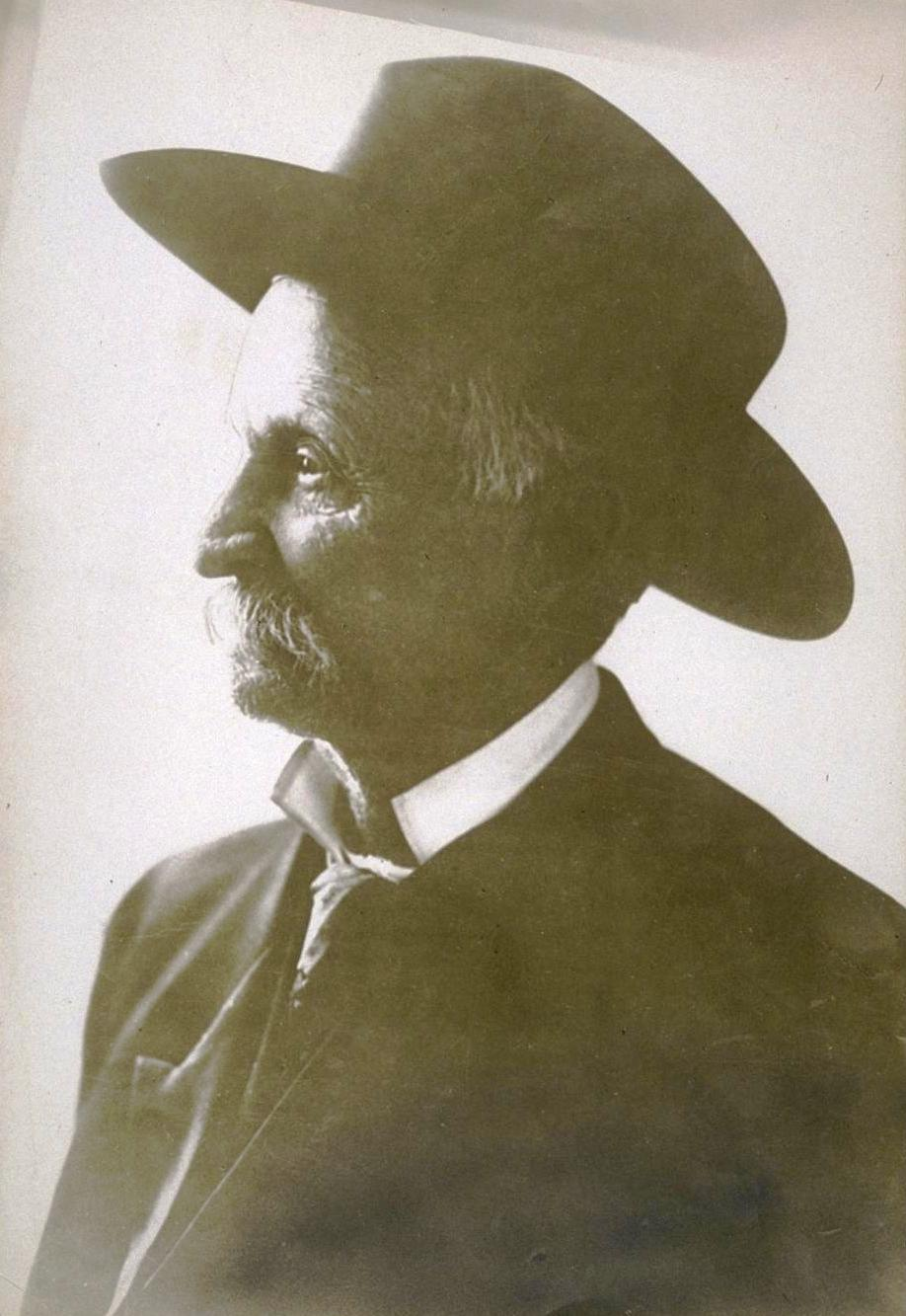
Elias J. "Lucky" Baldwin

Baldwin Hills and surrounding areas were part of Rancho La Cienega o Paso de la Tijera and later owned by the 19th century L.A. pioneer Elias "Lucky" Baldwin. The Sanchez Adobe de Rancho La Cienega o Paso de la Tijera was once the center of the rancho. In the 1920s, an addition was built linking the structures and the building was converted into a larger clubhouse for the Sunset Golf Course.

=== 1930s ===
The 1932 Los Angeles Olympics housed athletes at the Olympic Village in Baldwin Hills. It was the site of the very first Olympic Village ever built, in support of the 1932 Los Angeles Summer Olympic Games. Built for male athletes only, the village consisted of several hundred buildings, including post and telegraph offices, an amphitheater, a hospital, a fire department, and a bank. Female athletes were housed at the Chapman Park Hotel on Wilshire Boulevard. The Olympic Village was demolished after the Summer Olympic Games.

=== 1950s ===
In 1950, new homes in Baldwin Hills were designed by Paul W. Trousdale & Associates (of Trousdale Estates fame) and advertised as being near the "$30 million Crenshaw-Santa Barbara Shopping Center".

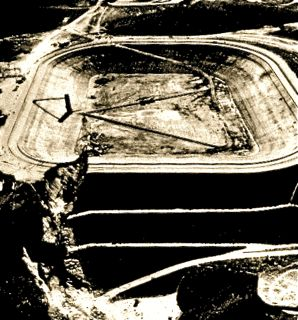
Baldwin Hills reservoir after collapse of the dam in 1963

=== 1960s ===
On December 14, 1963, a crack appeared in the Baldwin Hills Dam impounding the Baldwin Hills Reservoir. Within a few hours, water rushing through the crack eroded the earthen dam, gradually widening the crack until the dam failed catastrophically at 3:38 p.m. When the crack was discovered, police with bullhorns urged the evacuation of the area, but six people were killed. Two hundred homes were completely wiped out, and an additional 1500 to 2000 houses and apartment buildings were damaged, and most of Baldwin Vista and the historic Village Green community were flooded. The dam's failure was ultimately determined to be the result of subsidence, caused by overexploitation of the Inglewood Oil Field. The dam's failure prompted the Los Angeles Department of Water and Power to close and drain other small local reservoirs with similar designs, such as the Silver Lake Reservoir. The Baldwin Hills Dam was not rebuilt—instead, the empty reservoir was demolished, filled with earth, landscaped, and converted to Kenneth Hahn Regional Park.

=== 1980s ===
During the summer of 1985, a brush fire along La Brea Avenue spread up the canyon towards the homes along Don Carlos Drive in Baldwin Hills Estates. Many homes were destroyed despite the efforts of the Los Angeles Fire Department to suppress the flames. The fire killed three people and destroyed 69 homes; the arsonist was never caught.

In 1985, the Los Angeles Times noted that Baldwin Hills is "now often called the Black Beverly Hills".

== Geography ==
Baldwin Hills is bounded by La Cienega Boulevard to the west, Crenshaw Boulevard to the east, Stocker Street to the south and Obama Boulevard to the north with Martin Luther King Jr. Boulevard forming the northeast dividing line between Baldwin Hills and Crenshaw Manor. It is bordered on the west by Culver City and it shares the eastern border of Crenshaw Boulevard with Leimert Park.

The namesake mountain range is part of the neighborhood.

=== Neighborhoods ===
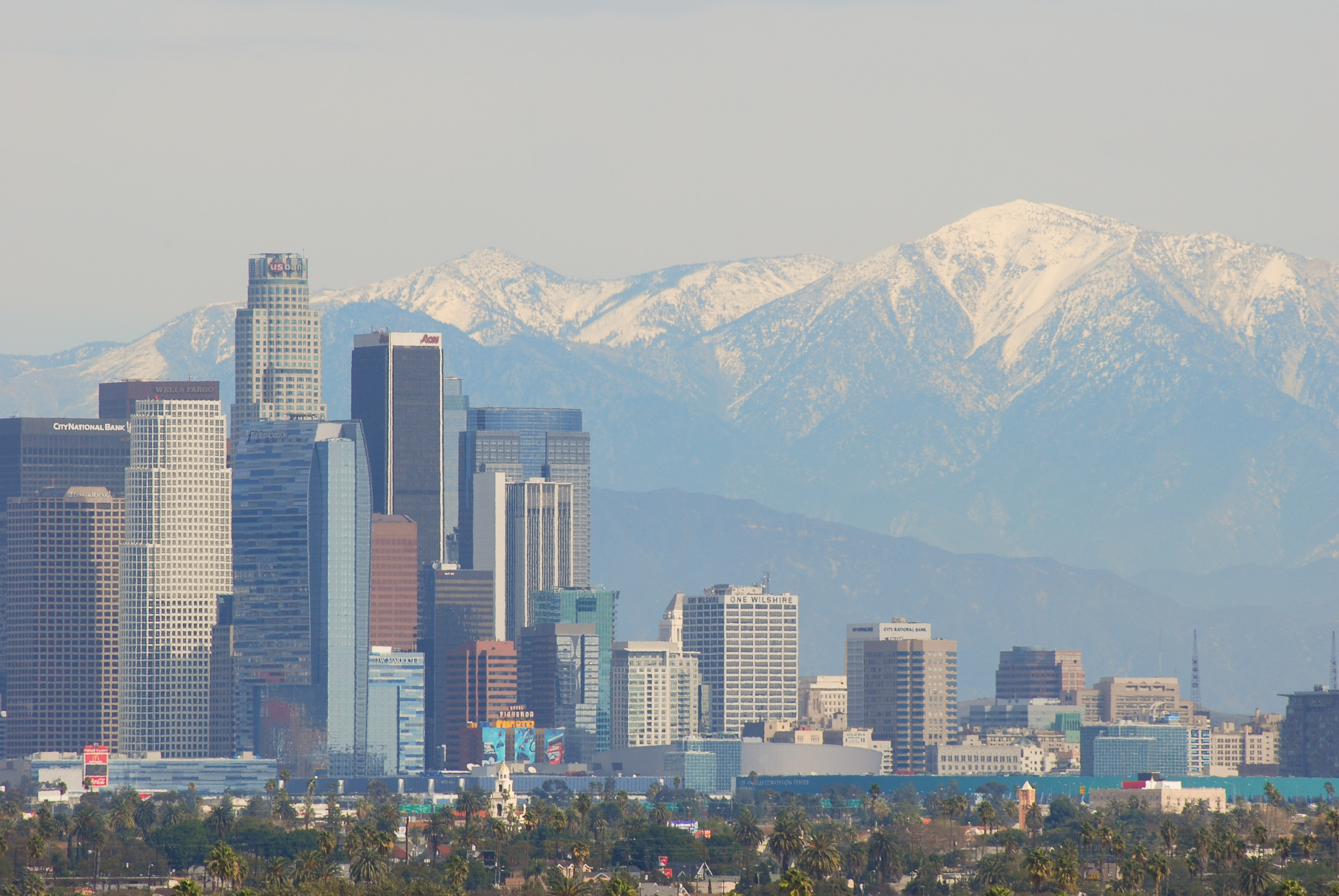
View from Baldwin Hills of Downtown Los Angeles in the distance and the San Gabriel Mountains

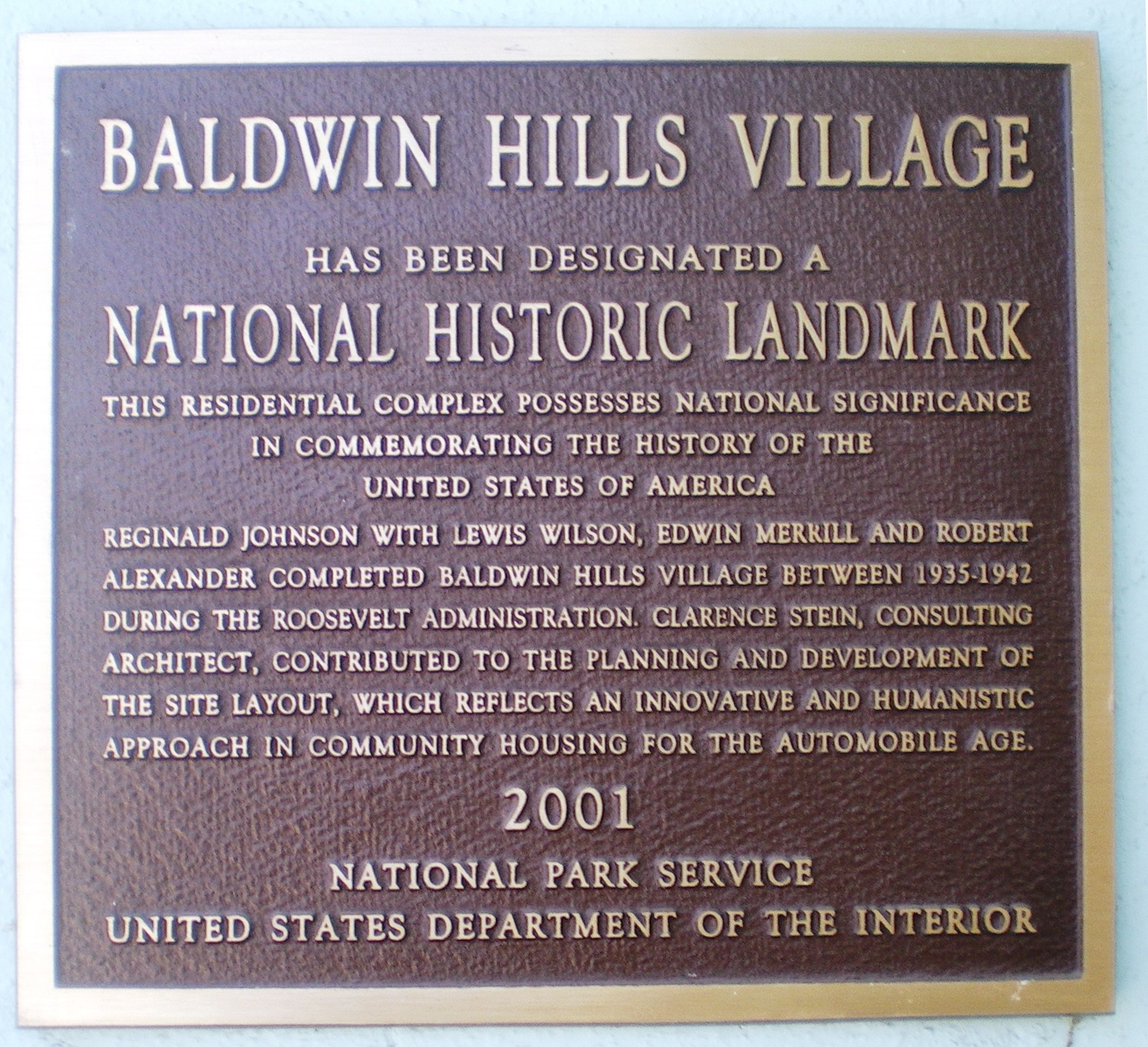
Baldwin Hills Village National Historic Landmark Plaque, at Village Green

Neighborhoods within Baldwin Hills include:

- Baldwin Hills Estates is locally known as "The Dons", because all but one street begins with the formal title of the city's original land holders. The oldest two streets in the neighborhood are Don Luis Drive and Don Mariano Drive. Old maps show those streets with the names Sprague Drive and Maryann Drive. Susan Miller Dorsey High School has called its school mascot The Dorsey Dons and Donnas after this neighborhood. The neighborhood is east of La Brea, southwest of Santo Tomas Drive, south of the Jim Gilliam Recreation Center and north of Stocker Street). It is sometimes called "the Black Beverly Hills". The neighborhood is characterized by hillside houses with swimming pools, and modern condominiums (the latter often jut out from steep hillsides, perched on stilts).
- Baldwin Village - In 1988, Baldwin Village became be a distinct community in the city's General Plan, and signs were to be posted to identify the area. It is bounded by La Brea Avenue, Marlton Avenue, Obama Boulevard, Martin Luther King Jr. Boulevard and Santo Thomas Drive. The neighborhood is the most densely populated part of Baldwin Hills, made up of many midcentury apartment complexes. Built before 1973, the area's apartments are subject to Los Angeles' rent stabilization ordinance and have been an important source of affordable housing in the otherwise very expensive Westside. One of the largest single complexes, the 669-unit Baldwin Village Apartments, has been acquired by the Housing Authority and converted into deed-restricted affordable housing.
- Baldwin Vista is bounded by La Cienega Boulevard to the West, La Brea Avenue to the East, Coliseum Street to the North, and Kenneth Hahn Park to the South. Containing houses on the north side of the mountain and in the hills.
- Village Green, originally named Baldwin Hills Village, is located north of Baldwin Vista, across Coliseum St. It is a historic Mid-Century modern "garden city" developed by Walter H. Leimert (1877–1970) multi-family residential. It was designated as a National Historic Landmark in 2001. The units are now condominiums on very spacious grounds, attracting seniors, young families, and design professionals as residents.

=== Climate ===
Climate data for Baldwin Hills, Los Angeles
Month	Jan	Feb	Mar	Apr	May	Jun	Jul	Aug	Sep	Oct	Nov	Dec	Year
Mean daily maximum °F (°C)	68 (20)	69 (21)	70 (21)	72 (22)	73 (23)	77 (25)	81 (27)	82 (28)	81 (27)	77 (25)	72 (22)	68 (20)	74 (23)
Mean daily minimum °F (°C)	47 (8)	49 (9)	51 (11)	53 (12)	57 (14)	60 (16)	63 (17)	64 (18)	63 (17)	59 (15)	52 (11)	47 (8)	55 (13)
Average precipitation inches (mm)	3.26 (83)	3.50 (89)	2.85 (72)	0.67 (17)	0.27 (6.9)	0.07 (1.8)	0.02 (0.51)	0.11 (2.8)	0.21 (5.3)	0.39 (9.9)	1.10 (28)	1.88 (48)	14.32 (364)

== Parks and recreation ==
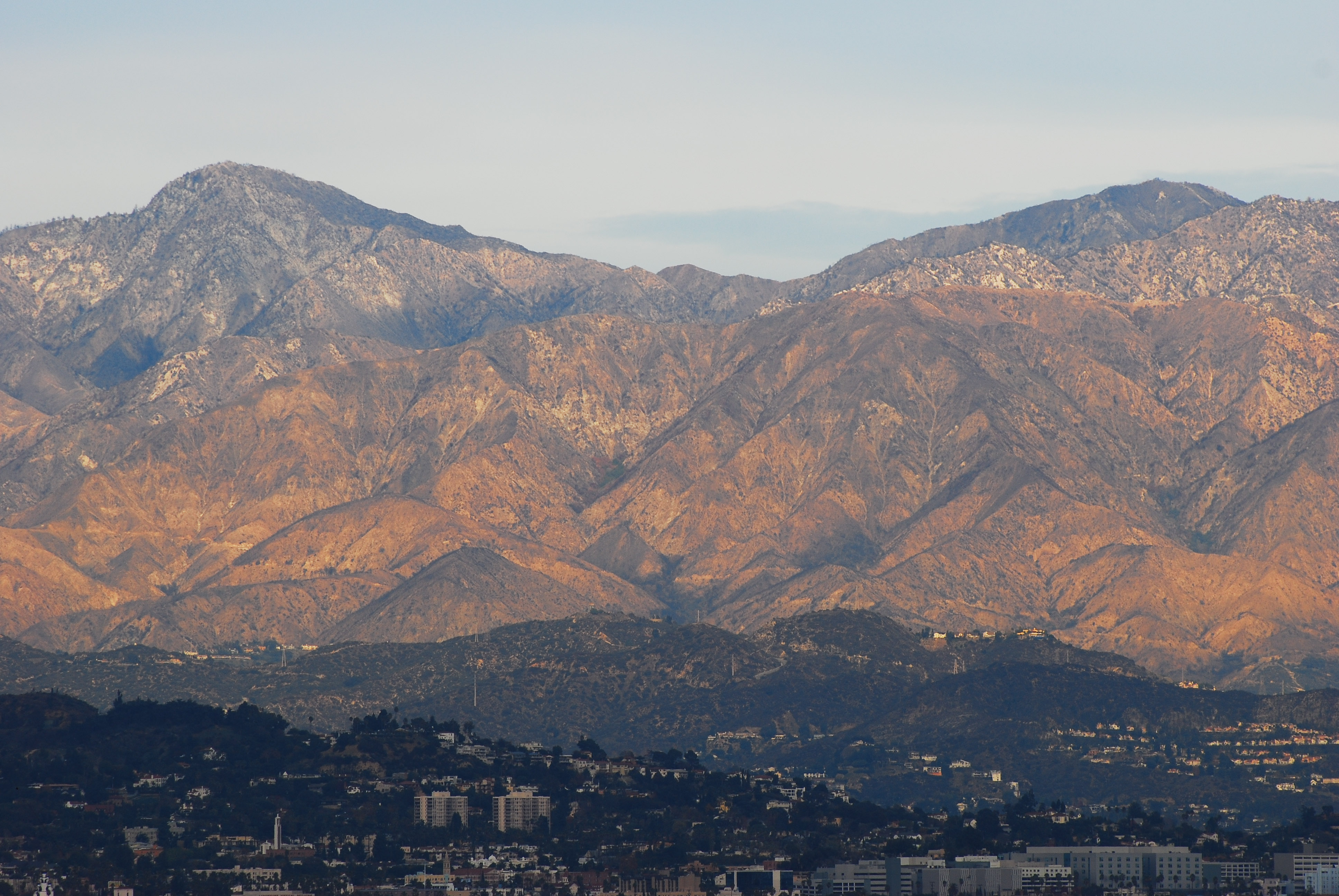
View of Hollywood Hills (lower eastern Santa Monica Mountains) and tall San Gabriel Mountains from Baldwin Hills from the Baldwin Hills Scenic Overlook Park

- Baldwin Hills Scenic Overlook State Park - The entrance to the park is located at 6300 Hetzler Road in Culver City, CA. The 8.5-acre (3.4 ha) park is open daily from 8 a.m. to sunset. The park includes an amphitheater, the Evan Frankel Discovery Center, picnic tables, and walking paths.
- Kenneth Hahn State Regional Park is located at 4100 South La Cienega Boulevard. It is a 401-acre recreation and sports area.
- Norman O Houston Park: is located at 4800 South La Brea Avenue.
- Jim Gilliam Park & Recreation Center is located at 4000 South La Brea Avenue. It is home to the Jim Gilliam Senior Citizen Center.

== Government ==
=== Police department ===
- Southwest Community Police Station - Law enforcement services in Baldwin Hills are provided by the Southwest Community Police Station.

=== Neighborhood council ===
- Empowerment Congress West - The neighborhood council for Baldwin Hills is Empowerment Congress West.

=== Library ===
- Baldwin Hills Branch Library - Operated by Los Angeles Public Library, the branch is located at 2900 La Brea Avenue.

== Education ==
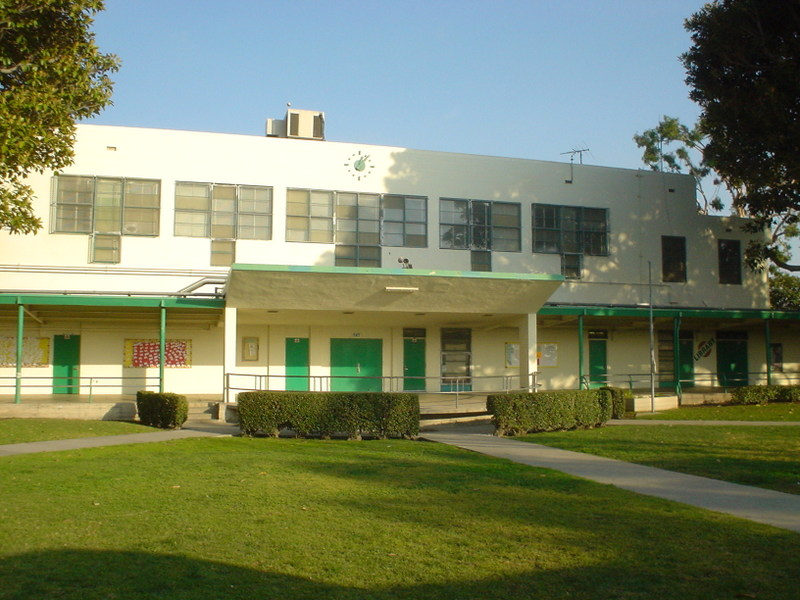
Susan Miller Dorsey High School, serving Baldwin Hills

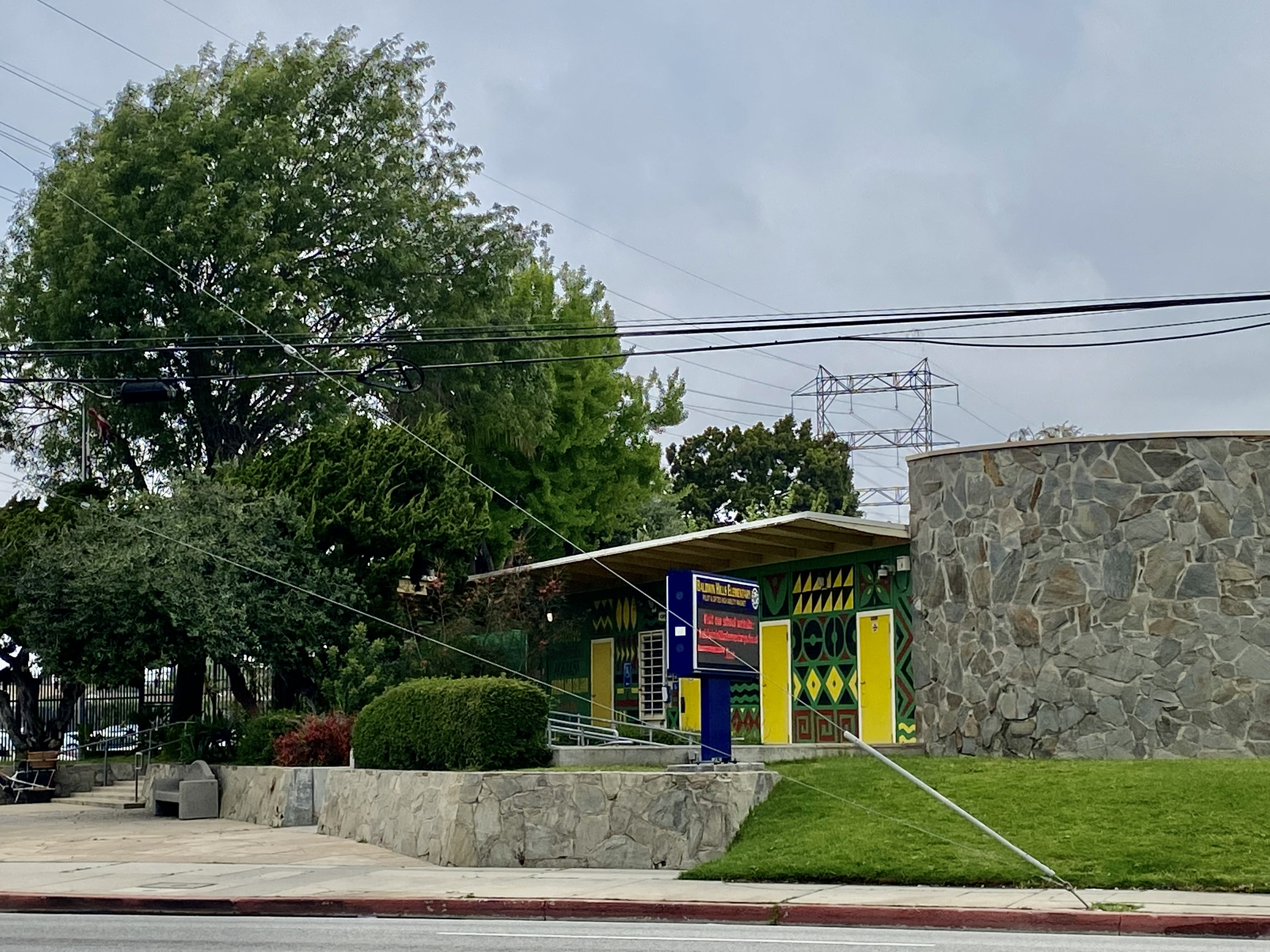
Baldwin Hills Elementary School

Baldwin Hills is served by Los Angeles Unified School District. Baldwin Hills also has a charter school. The schools operating within Baldwin Hills borders are:

- Baldwin Hills Elementary School
- Audubon Middle School
- Susan Miller Dorsey High School
- Windsor Math/Science/Aerospace Magnet
- Hillcrest Drive Elementary School.
- Marlton School
- New Designs Charter School

New LA Elementary School, a charter school, is on the grounds of Baldwin Hills Elementary. A California law called Proposition 39 allows New LA to occupy space on the grounds of Baldwin Hills Elementary. In 2022, area community members advocated for the charter school to move to another location since they believed that it meant there would not be enough space for the public elementary to operate efficiently.

== Media ==
=== Literature ===
- Magic Street - Orson Scott Card's urban fantasy novel set in Baldwin Hills.

=== Television ===
- Baldwin Hills - A reality show about several African-American teenagers living in Baldwin Hills.

== Notable people ==
- Danny Elfman
- Mike Love

== See also ==
- List of districts and neighborhoods in Los Angeles
