= Obama Boulevard =

Road in Los Angeles, California

- Former name: Rodeo Road
- Namesake: Barack Obama
- Maintained by: Los Angeles Department of Transportation
- Length: 3.5 miles (5.6 km)
- Location: Los Angeles, California
- West end: Culver City city limit near Ballona Creek
- East end: Exposition Boulevard in Leimert Park, Los Angeles

President Barack Obama Boulevard (commonly known as Obama Boulevard, formerly Rodeo Road) is a major thoroughfare in South Los Angeles. It stretches 3.5 miles (5.6 km) from Baldwin Hills (past Baldwin Village and Crenshaw Manor) to Leimert Park.

== History ==
Previously called Rodeo Road, it was renamed President Barack Obama Boulevard by the Los Angeles City Council on May 4, 2019. The Los Angeles Times characterized the renaming as important for local residents because it honored the first African American President and was a symbol of resistance to the first Donald Trump presidency. The city already has streets named after U.S. presidents, such as George Washington, John Adams, Thomas Jefferson, Abraham Lincoln, and Woodrow Wilson, as well as a street named for Reverend Dr. Martin Luther King Jr.—the former "Santa Barbara Avenue", thus renamed, and commonly known since the early 1980s as "King Boulevard". Then-Senator Obama held a campaign rally at Rancho Cienega Park when running for his first term as president.

== Commercial ==
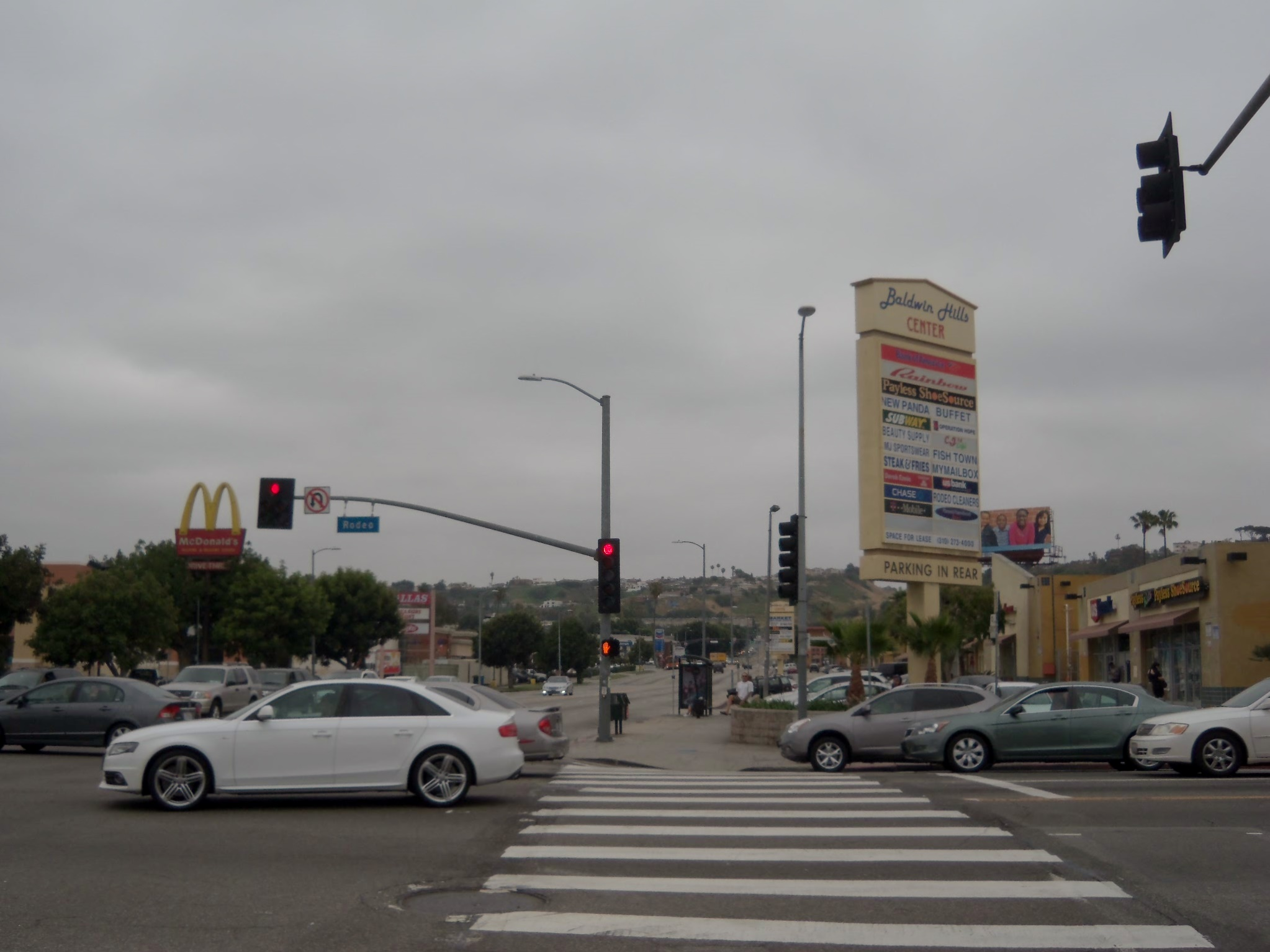
Baldwin Hills Shopping Center at Obama and La Brea boulevards

The former Rodeo Road's intersection with La Brea Avenue has been a commercial nexus since the mid-20th century, with the Baldwin Hills Shopping Center (not to be confused with the larger Baldwin Hills Crenshaw Plaza indoor mall) opening in 1954 with anchors Safeway, Clark's Drug Store (later became Sav-On Drugs in 1995) and J. J. Newberry; today the anchor tenants are Ralphs supermarket and CVS Pharmacy. The La Cienega–Rodeo Shopping Center had the Fedco warehouse club as an anchor, and is now anchored by Target. From the intersection of Obama and Crenshaw Boulevards, a commercial strip stretches down Crenshaw Boulevard to the Baldwin Hills Crenshaw Plaza.
