= Martin Luther King Jr. station (Los Angeles Metro) =

Light rail station in Los Angeles, California

Martin Luther King Jr
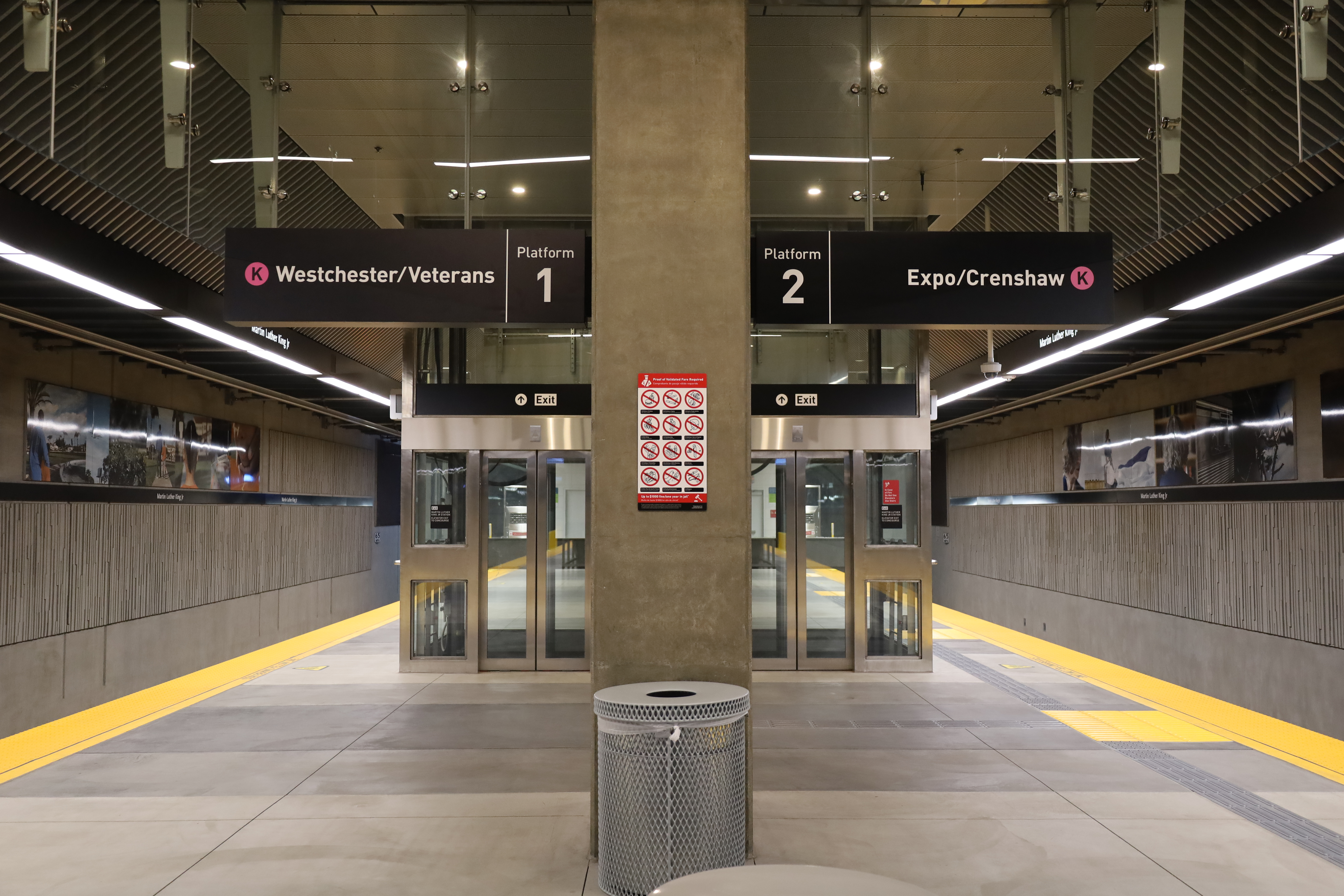
- Martin Luther King Jr. station platform in 2022

General information
- Location: 4051 South Crenshaw Boulevard; Los Angeles, California
- Coordinates: 34.009571°N 118.335288°W
- Owner: Los Angeles County Metropolitan Transportation Authority
- Platforms: 1 island platform
- Tracks: 2
- Connections: Los Angeles Metro Bus; LADOT DASH

Construction
- Structure type: Underground
- Accessible: Yes

History
- Opened: October 7, 2022

Passengers
- FY 2026: 332 (avg. wkdy boardings)

Services
Preceding station	Metro Rail	Following station
Expo/Crenshaw Terminus	K Line	Leimert Park toward Redondo Beach
Location

Martin Luther King Jr. station is an underground light rail station on the K Line of the Los Angeles Metro Rail system. It is located underneath Crenshaw Boulevard at its intersection with Martin Luther King Jr. Boulevard, after which the station is named, in the Los Angeles neighborhoods of Baldwin Hills and Crenshaw Manor. The station’s main entrance is next to the iconic Baldwin Hills Crenshaw Plaza shopping mall.

During planning, the station was known as "Crenshaw/MLK", with Metro adopting the current name in July 2015 in response to local feedback.

The station opened on October 7, 2022.

The station incorporates artwork by three artists: Mara Lonner, Shinique Smith, and Eileen Cowin.

== Service ==
=== Hours and frequency ===
K Line service hours are approximately from 4:30 a.m. until 12:00 a.m. daily. Trains operate every 10 minutes throughout most of the day. Trains run every 20 minutes after 8:00 p.m. every day and before 8:00 a.m. on weekends.

=== Connections ===
As of June 6, 2025, the following connections are available:

- Los Angeles Metro Bus: 40, 105, 210
- LADOT DASH: Crenshaw, Leimert/Slauson, Midtown

== Notable places nearby ==
The station is within walking distance of the following notable places:

- Baldwin Hills Crenshaw Plaza
- Marlton Square
- Stocker Street Creative (under construction)
