= Baldwin Hills Crenshaw Plaza =

Shopping mall in Los Angeles, California

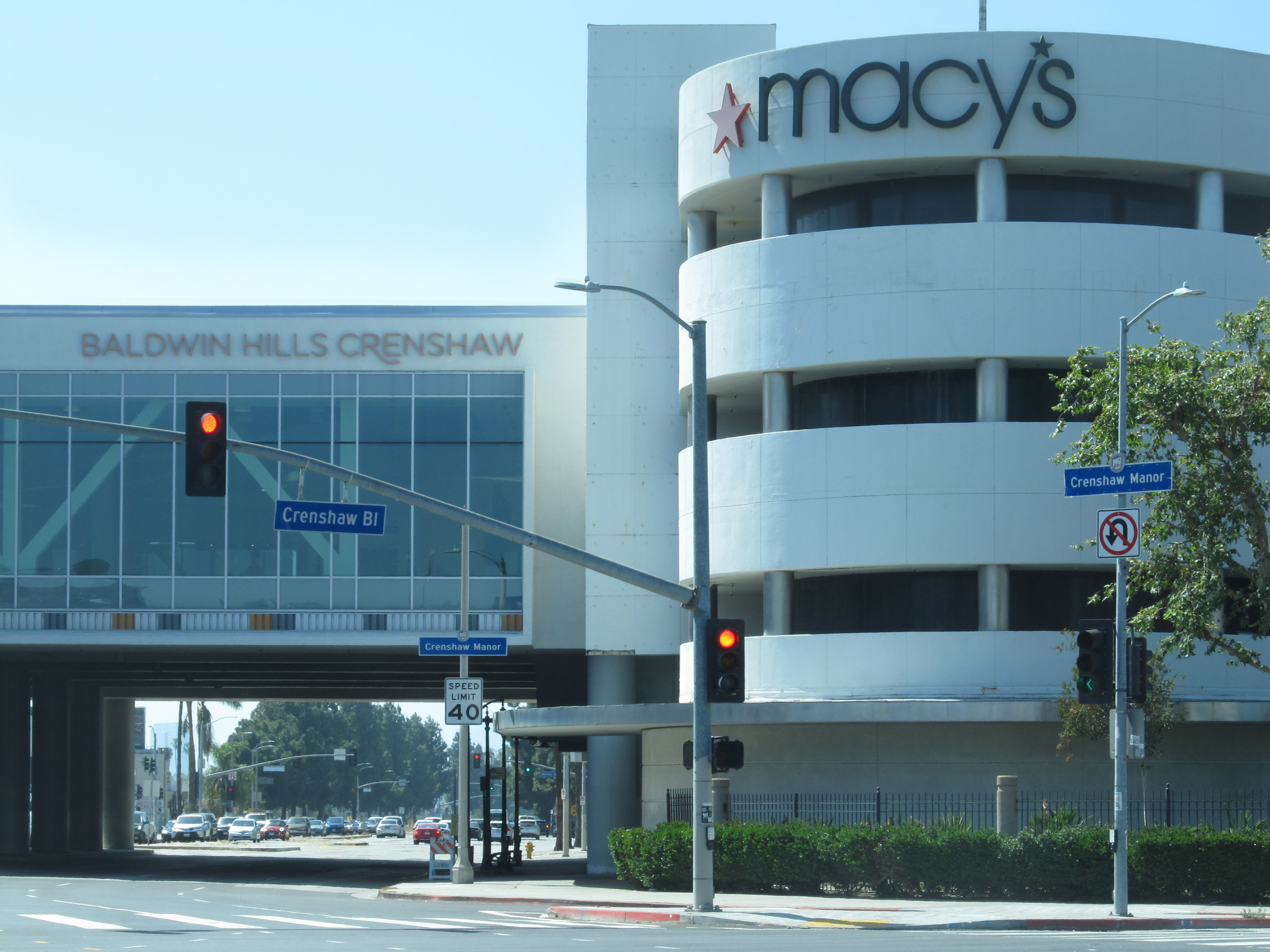
- Baldwin Hills Crenshaw Plaza and neighborhood signage, May 2022.
- Location: Los Angeles, California, U.S.
- Coordinates: 34.010079°N 118.337142°W
- Address: 3650 West Martin Luther King Boulevard, 90008
- Opened: November 21, 1947; 79 years ago
- Developer: Alexander Haagen Properties
- Manager: CBRE Group
- Owner: Harridge Development Group
- Architect: Paul R. Williams; Albert B. Gardner
- Num. of stores: 100+ (as of 2021)
- Num. of anchor tenants: 1 (2 vacant)
- Floor area: 870,000 sq ft (81,000 m^{2})
- Floors: 2
- Public transit: Martin Luther King Jr.
- Website: baldwinhillscrenshawmall.com

Baldwin Hills Crenshaw Plaza (alternately BHCP) is a shopping mall located within the Baldwin Hills neighborhood of Los Angeles, California. The mall lies southwest of Interstate 10. This was one of the first regional shopping centers in the United States built specifically for the automobile. The two anchor buildings, completed in 1947, retain their original Streamline Moderne style. Since the mid-1960s, the mall has become a major economic and cultural entertainment hub of surrounding African American communities which include a spectrum of socioeconomic classes. Approximately 32,000 people in the surrounding neighborhood visit the mall each year.

The mall's anchor store is TJ Maxx, after the closure of Macy's, Sears and Walmart. An additional net 2 million square feet (190,000 m^{2}) of new development was approved by the city in 2018. The approved plan includes apartments, condominiums, a 400-room hotel, office space and additional stores. The mall has been seeking a buyer who would build out the approved plan. The sale has been challenged with community protests including a group of neighborhood activists who made a play to acquire the property and develop it as a community-owned project. In 2021, Los Angeles based real estate company Harridge Development Group, bought the mall for about $111 million.

== History ==
=== Broadway-Crenshaw Center ===
The Broadway-Crenshaw Center was the first post-WWII open-air retail complex in the state of California. It was one of the first regional shopping centers in the United States built specifically for the automobile. The center, which opened on November 21, 1947, was anchored by a 200,000 square foot (19,000 m^{2}), five-story branch of The Broadway department store, Woolworth variety store, and Vons supermarket. The Broadway Building, which was designed by architects and developers Paul R. Williams and Albert B. Gardner of A.C. Martin & Associates, is an excellent example of Streamline Moderne architecture. Loading was done below ground via an underground service tunnel stretching the length of the property. The Broadway-Crenshaw Center covered a gross area of 550,000 square feet (51,000 m^{2}) on 35 acres (140,000 m^{2}) with 13 acres (53,000 m^{2}) of parking space for 7000 cars per days along Santa Barbara Avenue (now MLK Boulevard).

The May Company department store opened on October 10, 1947. The building, although designed and constructed by different project architects, it is also an excellent example of the Streamline Moderne architecture. The entire 7 acres (2.8 ha) block became part of the mall property. Silverwoods opened an 22,500 square feet (2,090 m^{2}) store on April 8, 1949, Albert B. Gardener was also the architect. More retail stores were added to the complex in the early 1950s and mid 1960s, including a Desmond's department store.

=== Major expansion ===
The shopping complex had undergone a massive renovation that started construction in mid-1986. Much of the original buildings were demolished. A modern two-level, indoor regional shopping mall structure was built in its place that included a new Sears department store as the third anchor. The Broadway and May Company anchor department stores were connected with a covered skyway pedestrian bridge over Martin Luther King Jr. Boulevard. A two-level parking structure was built on the west end of the mall. New restaurants were also built including a Sizzler and Taco Bell. A food court was also added which included restaurants such as T.J. Cinnamons and Hot Dog on a Stick.

Renamed the "Baldwin Hills Crenshaw Plaza", the new indoor shopping mall complex opened its doors to the public with a grand opening ceremony in November 1989 by Los Angeles mayor Tom Bradley who wanted to see a major shopping center in the neighborhood. A Lucky's supermarket opened in 1992, replacing the original Vons. The original May Company building was converted into a Robinsons-May in January 1993. With his encouragement to link the stores into an indoor mall, the mall's size increased to 870,000 square feet (81,000 m^{2}).

On July 12, 1995, the Magic Johnson Crenshaw 15 opened. The 15-screen cinema complex was the first multiplex theatre to be opened for the chain. The grand opening featured many well-known celebrity guest such as then Los Angeles Mayor Richard Riordan and others. The theatre also included a new two-level parking garage. The mall contains an additional 115 new retail and specialty shops on over 40 acres (160,000 m^{2}) of land which is located in one of the most densely populated and busiest areas in the United States. The Lucky's supermarket was later converted into an Albertsons supermarket in November 1999 after being purchased by the grocer. The original Broadway building became a Macy's in November 1996, which closed 3 years later and became a three-story Walmart superstore on January 22, 2003.

=== Capri Capital Partners ===
In early 2005, global investors Capri Capital Partners purchased the shopping mall. In September 2006, the Robinsons-May department store rebranded as Macy's, making its second entry to the mall after a 7-year hiatus since the first store closure in 1999. In 2011, the mall owners added a new interior embellishment, a modern and larger food court with dining spaces on the first level. Capri had also redesigned the “theme” Baldwin Hills Crenshaw Bridge to a glass see-through bridge overlooking Crenshaw Boulevard and Martin Luther King Jr. Boulevard. The windows created a meeting space for events such as various classes, Taste of Soul auditions, and an exercise program for senior citizens. There was also new paint jobs to the Macy's and Walmart historical department buildings. The buildings were painted from peach to bright white. The Sizzler restaurant was demolished and a Staples superstore was constructed in its place. New tenants with and after the second renovation included a new Cinemark XD 15-screen multiplex theater with D-Box seats, PINK, Victoria's Secret, Forever 21 and Lane Bryant. New restaurants included Buffalo Wild Wings, Post & Beam, Southern Girl Desserts, The Kickin' Crab, Yogurtland and Chipotle Mexican Grill. The first phase of renovation was officially completed in November 2011. The original Broadway building which had become a Walmart in 2003, closed on January 17, 2016. On November 7, 2019, it was announced that Sears would be closing this location a part of a plan to close 96 stores nationwide. The store officially closed in February 2020, leaving Macy's as the mall's only traditional anchor. In January 2023, Macy's announced their store at the center would close. Macy's closed in March 2023, leaving the mall with no traditional anchors left.

=== Mixed-use approval ===
In 2017, a draft EIR was processed. With city council in 2018, the site received entitlements to transform the shopping mall into a 24-hour mixed-use entertainment complex with commercial, office and residential structures. The expansion on the 43 acres (17 ha) site would include: a luxury 400-room hotel and resort, an office tower with a penthouse level, an open-air plaza, mid to high upscale restaurants, acres of public space, a multi-story parking structure and residential units with low-rise condominiums and apartments.

==== Harridge Development Group ====
In 2020 many real estate firms bided on the mall. In April 2020, CIM Group agreed to buy the mall for more than $100 million with plans to convert the former Sears and Walmart into offices to drive more foot traffic into the remaining retail stores. There was strong community opposition to their plans which did not include the residential component and the sale was cancelled in June 2020. The mall was closed for much of 2020 due to the COVID-19 pandemic. A sale to LIVWRK and DFH Partners had been expected to close before the end of 2020. During the transition to a new owner, community leaders and groups have expressed concern about African American ownership and participation in the project. The mall has been seeking a buyer who would build out the approved plan but the sale to LIVWRK and DFH Partners was scuttled in December 2020 after meeting with community protests. A local investment group called Downtown Crenshaw led by developer Damien Goodman, made an offer to purchase the mall through a community land trust but has been turned down. With the assistance of experienced architecture firms, they created a plan that included affordable housing, a healthcare clinic, child care, satellite campuses for job training, conference spaces, and Black art spaces. The group continues to advocate for community based ownership of the mall. In August 2021, Los Angeles-based real estate firm Harridge Development Group acquired the mall for about $111 million. They also bought the Macy's department store building in a separate transaction of more than $30 million which gave Harridge control of almost the entire 42-acre (17 ha) site that straddles Martin Luther King Jr. Boulevard. The group plans to renovate and transform the shopping mall into a modern mixed-use lifestyle center entertainment complex with affordable housing, green spaces, a luxury hotel, multi-story townhouses, office space, stores and restaurants.

After the sale went through, developer David Gross broke his silence on the sale that did not go to the local group and said that "Historically, systems and institutions have not engaged with the Black community in ways that have been fair to the Black community." Gross and his group of investors had offered $110 million to acquire the shopping center. Gross considers this mall dear to his heart because since it was the community he has grew up in.

On March 5, 2026, a groundbreaking ceremony took place for the first phase of the project. The former Sears building and its parking structure, along with the adjacent restaurant buildings will be demolished to make way for multi-story townhomes.

== Neighborhood ==
As African Americans began moving to the Crenshaw District and Baldwin Hills in the mid-1960s, the mall has been a major economic and cultural hub of the African American community of a spectrum of socioeconomic classes with a Black Santa Claus and dozens of minority-owned businesses are tenants. In 1976, May Company offered space to the Museum of African American Art on the third floor of what later became Macy's. Samella Lewis, who had founded the museum in 1975, wanted "to provide art services to students, scholars, teachers and lay persons concerned with the art and cultural history of the peoples of the African Diaspora.". Since the closer of the Macy's building, the museum now is located within the mall itself. Today, the neighborhood is becoming more ethnically diverse and gentrified, through redevelopment within the immediate neighborhood and the South Los Angeles area.

=== Events ===
The mall has hosted the Leimert Park Book Fair since it began in 2007. The Cinemark movie theater in the mall have screened movies for many of the annual Pan African Film Festival. The shopping mall has also been the home to the Leimert Park Jazz Festival since 2020.

== Transit access ==
The Metro K Line is a light rail line that has key stops along the route include the LAX/Metro Transit Center. The mall has an underground subway station called the Martin Luther King Jr. station, that serves the shopping mall, the adjacent Kaiser Permanente medical facility at Marlton Square and the future Stocker Street Creative film studio complex.. It opened in October 2022. The mall is also served by the LADOT DASH shuttle and LACMTA lines adjacent to the Cinemark movie theatre. It is also served by the Hollywood Bowl Park & Ride shuttle bus service.
