= Baldwin Village, Los Angeles =

Baldwin Village
- Neighborhood
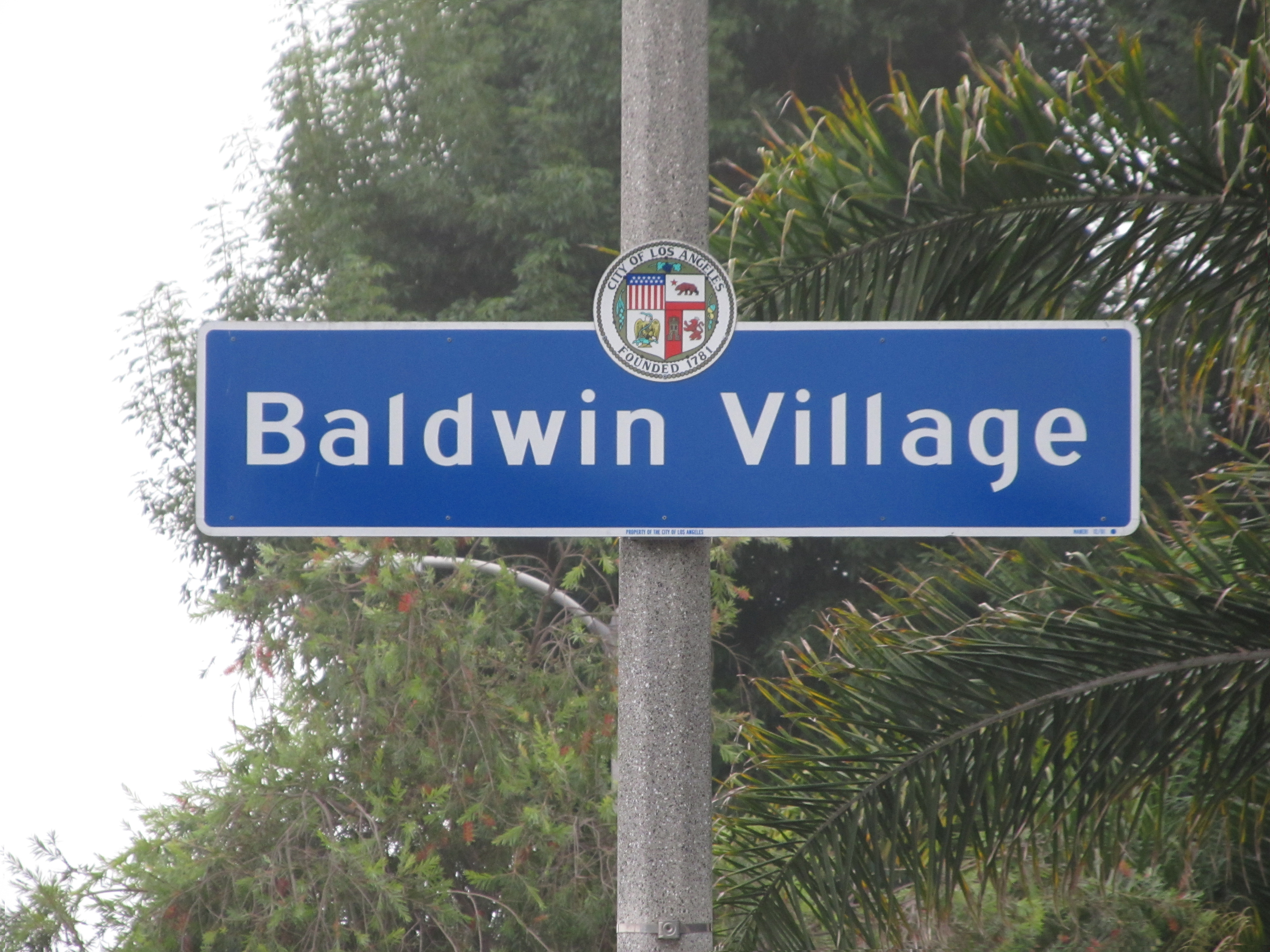
- Street sign marking the border of the Baldwin Village neighborhood, located at the intersection of Obama Boulevard and Martin Luther King Jr. Boulevard
- Nickname: The Jungle
- Location within West Los Angeles Location within the Los Angeles Metropolitan Area Location within California
- Coordinates: 34°00′54″N 118°20′52″W
- Country: United States
- State: California
- County: Los Angeles
- City: Los Angeles
- Time zone: Pacific
- Zip Code: 90008
- Area code: 323

Baldwin Village is a neighborhood in the south region of the city of Los Angeles, California.

== Geography ==
In 1988, Baldwin Village became a distinct community in the city's General Plan, and signs were to be posted to identify the area. It is bounded by La Brea Avenue, Marlton Avenue, Obama Blvd, Martin Luther King Jr. Boulevard and Santo Thomas Drive.

== History ==
Baldwin Village was developed in the early 1940s and 1950s by architect Clarence Stein, as an apartment complex for young families. Baldwin Village is occasionally called "The Jungles" by locals because of the tropical trees and foliage (such as palms, banana trees and begonias) that once thrived among the area's tropical-style postwar apartment buildings. The Los Angeles City Council changed the name in 1990, after residents complained that it reinforced the neighborhood's image as a wild and menacing place. They renamed it Baldwin Village after the Baldwin Hills neighborhood.

== Development ==
=== Marlton Square ===
Development of Marlton Square was stalled in bankruptcy after years of work and millions of dollars of public and private funds until early 2012.

=== Kaiser Permanente ===
The neighborhood houses a 100,000 square foot Kaiser Permanente medical office building and outdoor plaza which opened on September 7, 2017.

=== Costco ===
A first-of-its-kind, mixed-use development featuring a Costco warehouse club store beneath 800 residential units has broken ground in the neighborhood as of September 2024. Occupying the former site of a former cable company facility, the development will include over 180 units of affordable housing and surpass the Baldwin Village Apartments as the largest single residential complex in the area. Originally conceived as only a retail development, the project took advantage of new state laws streamlining development approvals and loosening zoning laws for projects with large amounts of affordable housing.

== Education ==
- Hillcrest Drive Elementary - 4041 Hillcrest Dr, Los Angeles, CA 90008

== Media ==
=== Film ===
Baldwin Village served as a location for the 1992 film White Men Can't Jump. The neighborhood also appears in the 2001 film Training Day. The 2025 film One of Them Days is also set in the neighborhood, with the characters referring to it as ‘The Jungles.’

=== Television ===
It was also in episode 1 of Season 3 of the NBC television series Southland.

It was a prominent setting in the CBS television series S.W.A.T. episode "Local Heroes" (Season 4, Episode 15).

=== Music videos ===
Waka Flocka Flame's "Hard in Da Paint" music video was also filmed in Baldwin Village.

== See also ==
- Baldwin Hills
- Crenshaw District
- Baldwin Hills Mountain Range
