= Village Green, Los Angeles =

- Baldwin Hills Village
- U.S. National Register of Historic Places
- U.S. National Historic Landmark District
- Los Angeles Historic-Cultural Monument
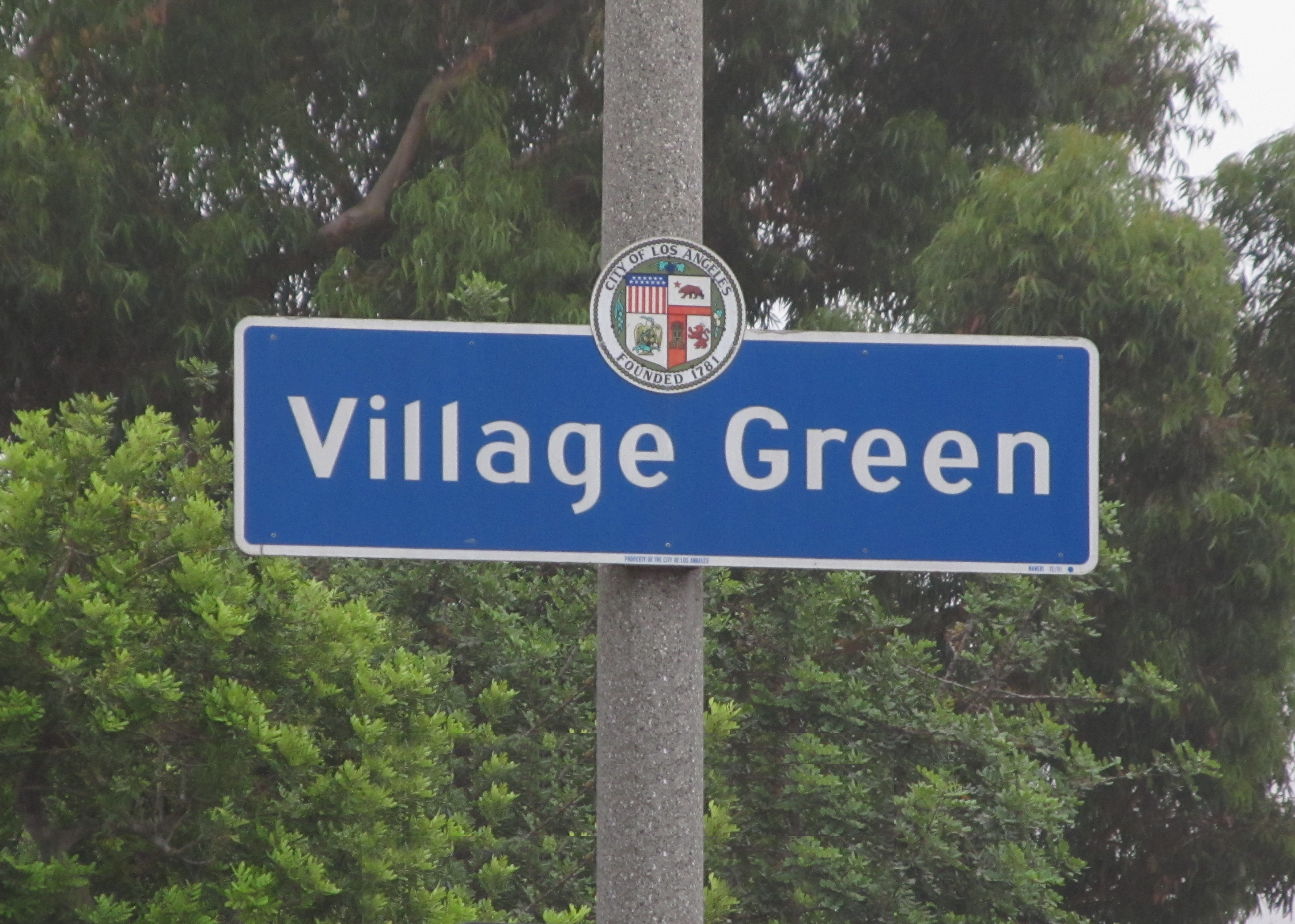
- Village Green neighborhood sign located at the intersection of Obama and Hauser Boulevards

- Location within the Los Angeles metropolitan area Location within California Location within the United States
- Location: Los Angeles, California
- Coordinates: 34°01′11″N 118°21′39″W
- Area: 64 acres (26 ha)
- Built: 1942
- Architect: Clarence Stein; Reginald D. Johnson
- Architectural style: Modern Movement
- NRHP reference No.: 93000269
- LAHCM No.: 174

Significant dates
- Added to NRHP: April 1, 1993
- Designated NHLD: January 3, 2001
- Designated LAHCM: May 4, 1977

Village Green, originally named Baldwin Hills Village, is a neighborhood at the foot of Baldwin Hills, within the city of Los Angeles, California. Village Green consists of a large condominium complex that is both a Los Angeles Historic-Cultural Monument and a National Historic Landmark. Designed in the late 1930s and completed by 1942, it is one of the oldest planned communities of its type in the nation. Village Green was named by The American Institute of Architects as one of the 100 most important architectural achievements in U.S. history.

== Geography ==
Village Green is located between Obama Boulevard and Coliseum Street, and between Hauser Blvd. and slightly west of La Brea Avenue, in the northwestern South Los Angeles region. The Baldwin Village neighborhood is just east of Village Green and La Brea Avenue. The site design consists of outer vehicular circulation roads, with spur roadways between some of the buildings of the complex. At its center is an elongated oval greensward, lined and crossed by paved walkways. Smaller garden courts extend outward from the central area between the residence buildings. The spur roads provide access to garage buildings, which also historically housed access to common facilities such as laundry rooms. The residences are one or two story frame structures finished in plaster, with the living units organized so that the living room and master bedroom face one of the garden spaces.

== History ==
=== Origin ===
The Baldwin Hills Village complex was built in 1942 as one of the most ambitiously planned communities in Los Angeles at the time, with 627 apartments grouped in buildings on a very large landscaped site. The Modernist Garden city style complex, which encompassed 627 units, was designed by architect Reginald D. Johnson, consulting architect Clarence S. Stein, with the firm of Wilson, Merill & Alexander, and landscape architect Fred Barlow Jr. It also featured a mural by Italian-American artist Rico Lebrun. The units seldom have more than two bedrooms, and tend to attract seniors and younger professionals as residents. As one of the first such establishments, the Village Green was also designed with the requirements of car-owners in mind. The development "was designed with all the roads and garages confined to the edges of its eighty-acre expanse."

=== Landmark status ===
As Baldwin Hills Village, Village Green was declared a Los Angeles Historic-Cultural Monuments in 1977, listed on the National Register of Historic Places in 1993, and a National Historic Landmark historic district in 2001.

== Gallery ==
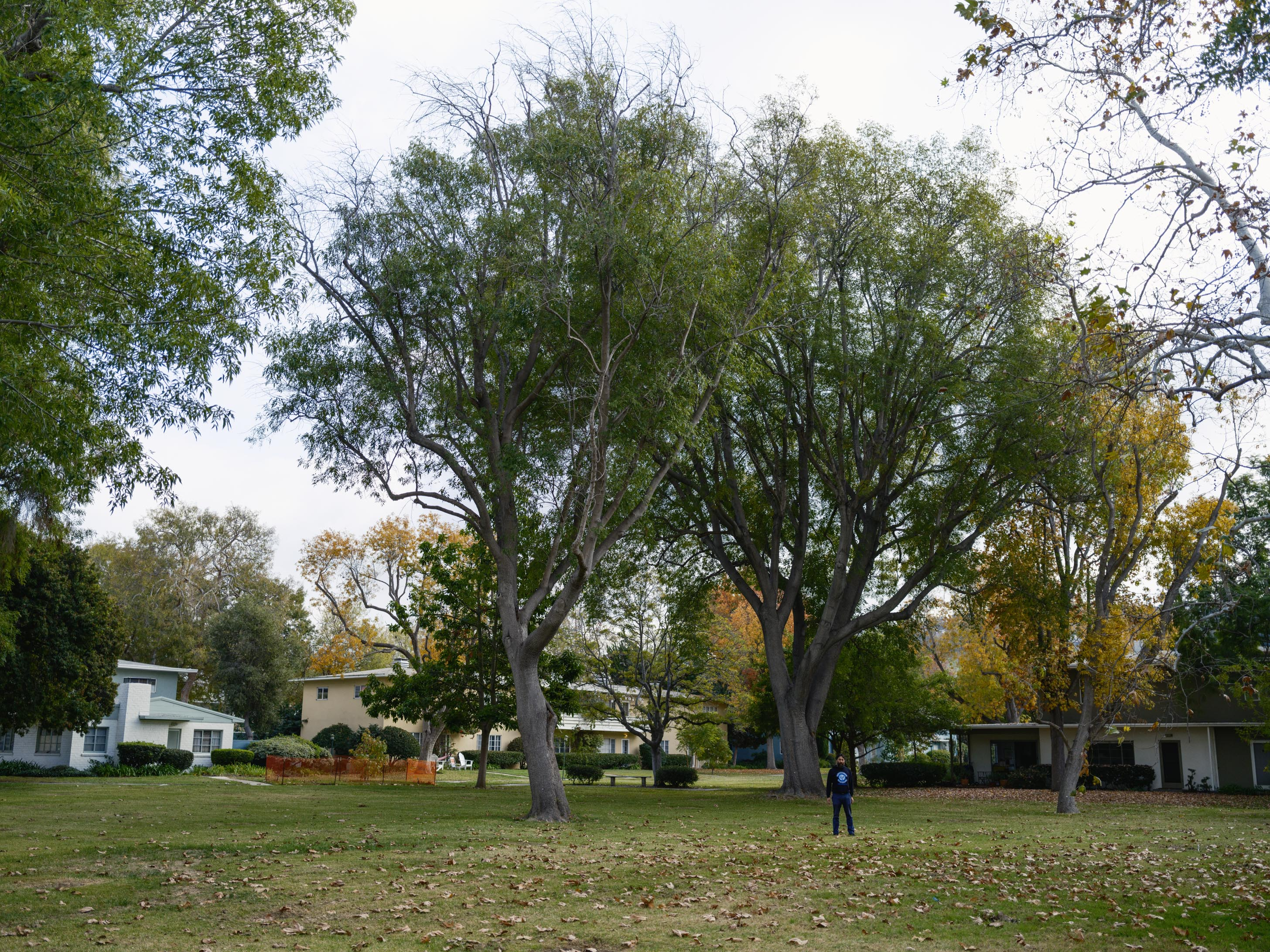
A view inside Village Green, 2022

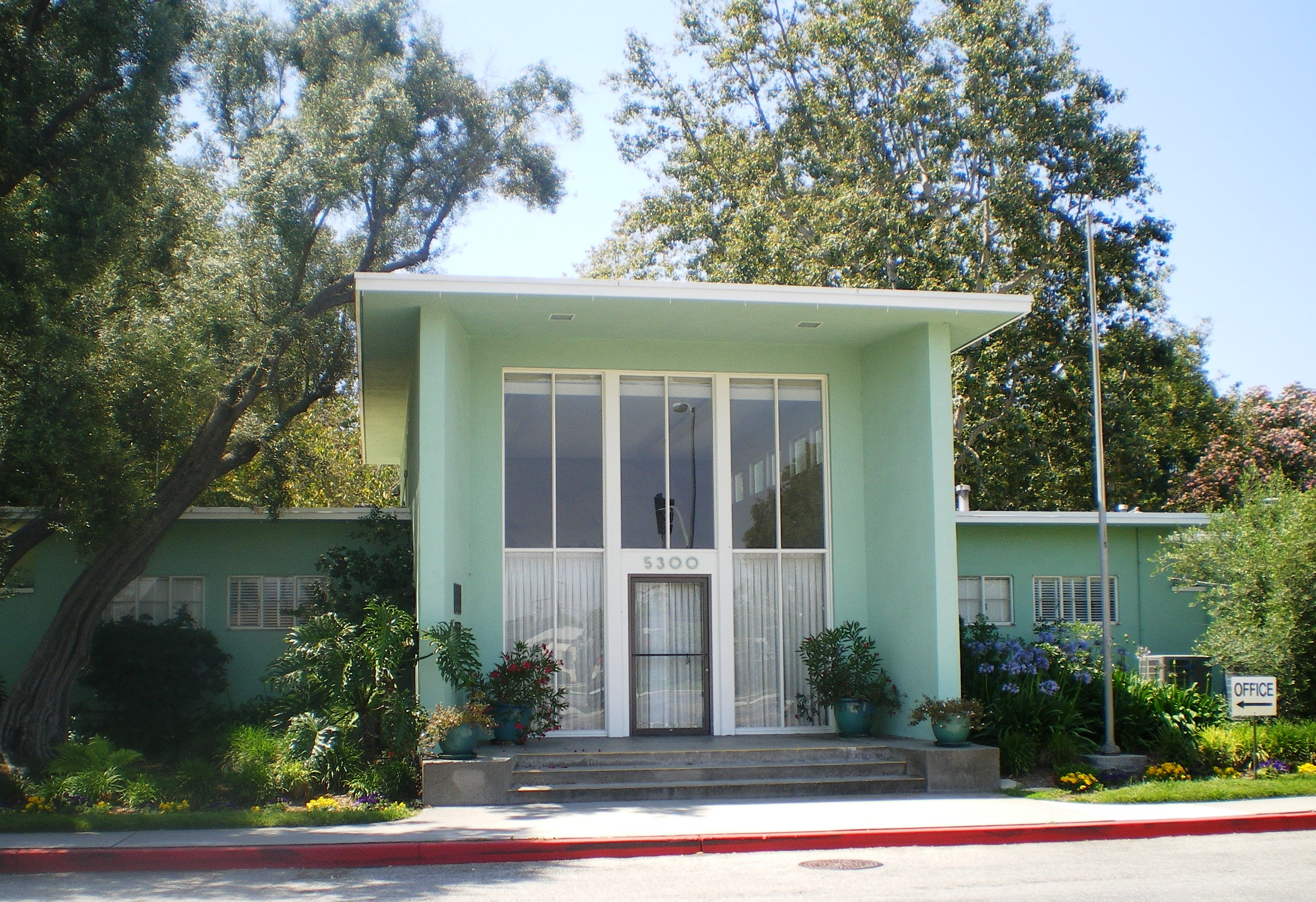
Village Green Office Building, 2007

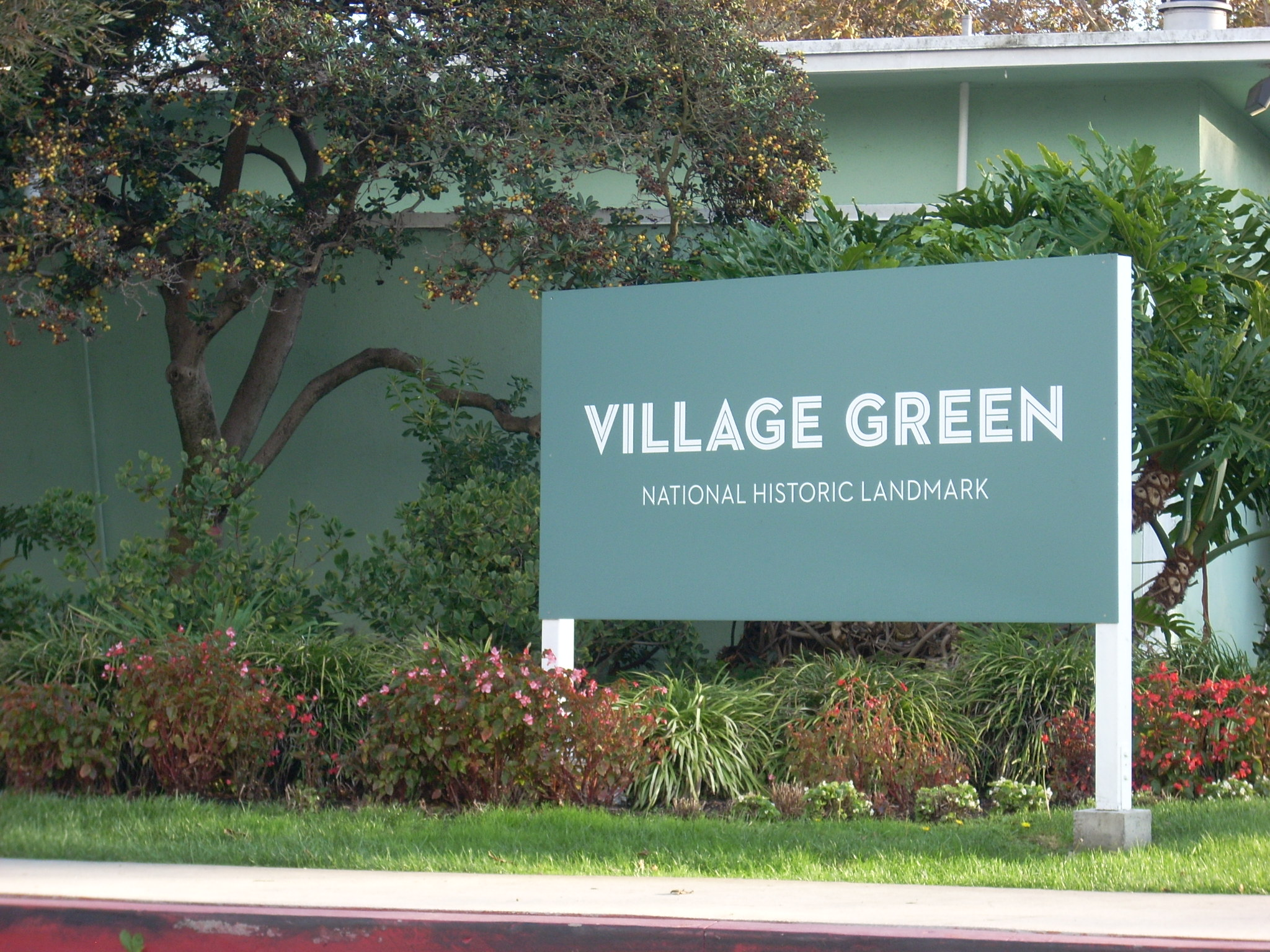
Village Green identification sign, 2011

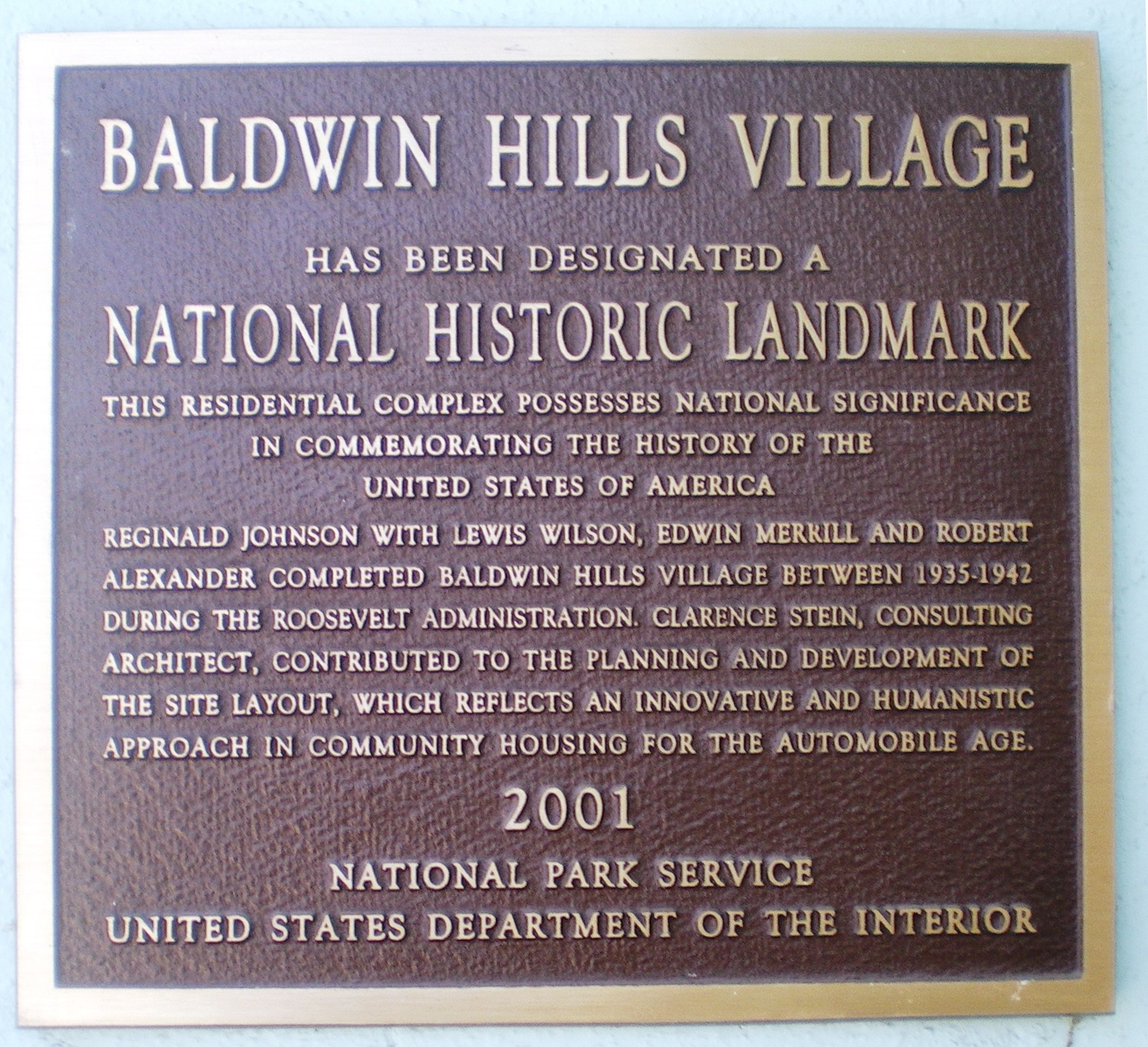
Baldwin Hills Village National Historic Landmark plaque

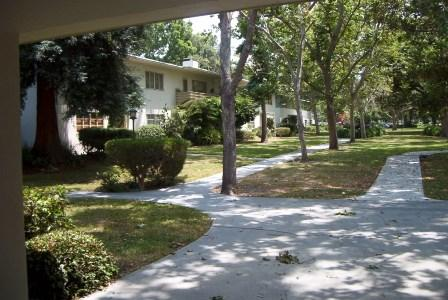

== See also ==
- List of National Historic Landmarks in California
- National Register of Historic Places listings in Los Angeles, California
- List of Los Angeles Historic-Cultural Monuments in South Los Angeles
