= Marlton School =

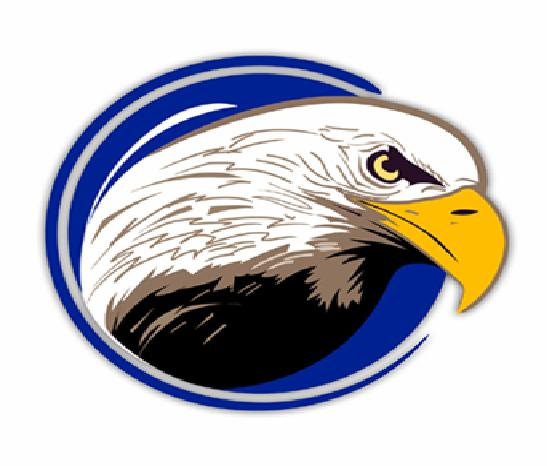

Location
- 4000 Santo Tomas Drive; Los Angeles, California 90008; United States; 34.008978°N 118.343503°W

Information
- Type: Public
- Established: August 1968; 58 years ago
- School district: Los Angeles Unified School District
- NCES School ID: 062271007759
- Principal: Kim Miller
- Teaching staff: 17.50 (on an FTE basis)
- Grades: K–12
- Enrollment: 215 (2018-19)
- Student to teacher ratio: 12.29
- Colors: Blue and Yellow
- Athletics conference: Crosstown League, CIF Southern Section
- Mascot: Eagle
- Team name: Eagles
- Website: www.marltonschool.org

Marlton School is a KG–12 public special school for the deaf and hard of hearing students in Los Angeles, California, United States. It was established in 1968 and is part of the Los Angeles Unified School District.

It offers a bilingual program in American Sign Language and English, and was one of the first non-residential schools to be admitted to the Center for ASL/English Bilingual Education and Research (CAEBER) program called ASL/English Bilingual Professional Development (AEBPD). It is the only school district-run school for deaf and hard-of-hearing children in California.

The school is prominent for its partnership with California State University, Northridge, Deaf West Theatre, Greater Los Angeles Agency on Deafness (GLAD), the Greenelight Foundation, and the Los Angeles Police Department. It was the inspiration for Carlton School for the Deaf on ABC Family's television show Switched at Birth starring Vanessa Marano and Katie Leclerc.

== History ==
It was founded in September 1968 as a pre-Kindergarten through grade 9 school. A high school program began in the fall of 1971, and the first student to graduate from Marlton's high school program, previously a student at Hollywood High School after attending Marlton's elementary and junior high programs, did so in 1972.
