= Martin Luther King Jr. Boulevard (Los Angeles) =

Major east-west thoroughfare in Los Angeles, California

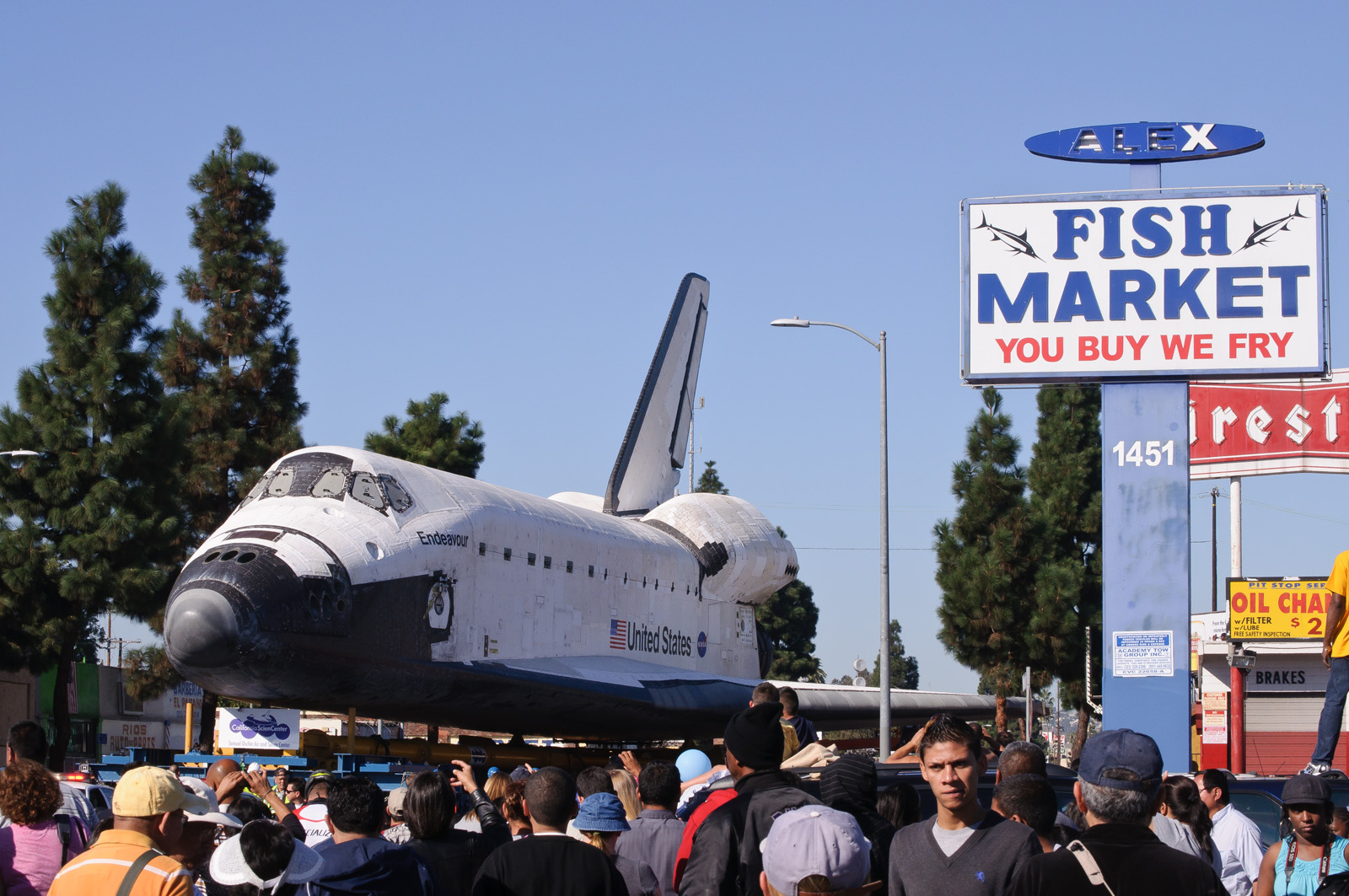
- Space Shuttle Endeavour, 2012
- Namesake: Martin Luther King Jr.
- Maintained by: Bureau of Street Services, City of L.A. DPW
- Length: 7.1 miles (11.4 km)
- Nearest metro station: Martin Luther King Jr.
- West end: Obama Boulevard in Baldwin Village
- East end: South Alameda Street in South Los Angeles

Other
- Known for: Baldwin Hills Crenshaw Plaza

Martin Luther King Jr. Boulevard (also known as MLK Blvd or simply King Blvd; originally Santa Barbara Avenue) is an east-west thoroughfare in Los Angeles, California. It stretches 7.1 miles (11.4 km) from Obama Boulevard in Baldwin Village to South Alameda Street in South Los Angeles. Prior to 1983, the boulevard was known as Santa Barbara Avenue.

== Background ==
Originally 40th Street, it was renamed Santa Barbara Avenue. The street was officially renamed to MLK Blvd on January 15, 1983. The name change to honor the civil rights leader reflected the large black community in that part of Los Angeles. The name change effort was headed by Tuskegee Airman and local businessman Celes King III.

The original location of the Sephardic Temple Tifereth Israel was at the corner of Santa Barbara Avenue and LaSalle Avenue in Chesterfield Square.

In a stand-up routine on the 1996 television special Bring the Pain, comedian Chris Rock said, "Martin Luther King stood for nonviolence ... Now what's Martin Luther King? A street ... if you on Martin Luther King Boulevard, there’s some violence going down."

MLK Boulevard in Los Angeles is different than the Martin Luther King Jr. Boulevard in Lynwood, California, which is an extension of Century Boulevard. The City of Los Angeles also honored King by establishing the "Dr. Martin Luther King, Jr. Memorial Tree Grove" in the Kenneth Hahn State Recreation Area.

== Public transit ==
MLK Blvd is served by Metro Local line 40. The K Line has a station under at Crenshaw Boulevard.

== See also ==
- Exposition Park
