= Destination Crenshaw =

Open-air African American museum in Los Angeles, California

- Established: 2019
- Location: Crenshaw Boulevard, Hyde Park, Los Angeles
- Coordinates: 34°0′0″N 118°19′51″W
- Type: History and culture of African Americans
- Architects: Zena Howard, (Gabrielle Bullock, managing principal) Perkins+Will
- Public transit access: Hyde Park
- Website: destinationcrenshaw.la

Destination Crenshaw is an under-construction 1.3-mile-long (2.1 km) open-air museum along Crenshaw Boulevard in Los Angeles, California, dedicated to preserving the history and culture of African Americans. The project includes new pocket parks, outdoor sculptures, murals, street furniture, and landscaping.

== Design ==
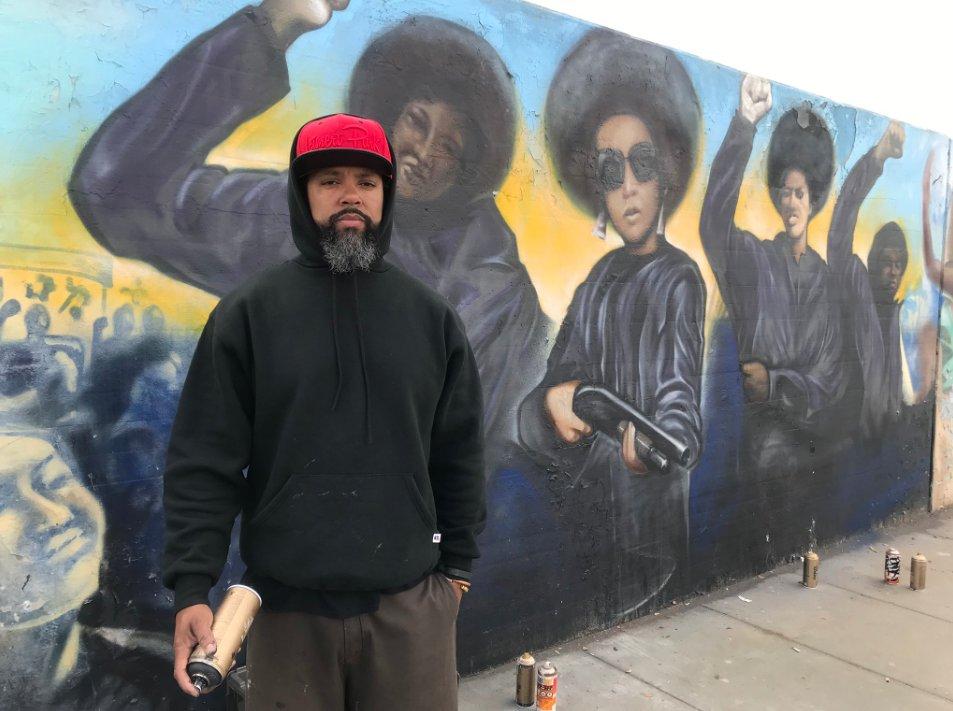
Our Mighty Contribution Mural being repaired after vandalism

The design of the street features four nodes along its length, each featuring a theme celebrating the heritage of the area's African American art. The northernmost end of the project at Sankofa Park creates a large new public park adjacent to Leimert Park Metro station. A Sankofa bird is depicted with its head turned backwards while its feet face forward carrying a precious egg in its mouth. Park visitors will be able to look north and south from an elevated viewing platform. Sculptures by Charles Dickson, Maren Hassinger, Artis Lane, and Kehinde Wiley will be in Sankofa Park. The nearby Leimert Plaza Park is a gathering place in Leimert Park Village which has served as a hub of African-American art and culture in Los Angeles. The second node will be located at 50th Street near Crenshaw High School and is themed "Dreams". This node was inspired by local architect Paul Revere Williams (1894 – 1980). A sculpture by Alison Saar was inspired by her memories of her mother, the artist Betye Saar, shopping here. "The Crenshaw Wall" has an existing mural titled "Our Mighty Contribution" depicting the millennia of black history starting with the words, "In the beginning". The 800-foot mural (240 m) was painted in 2000 but the wall has been the site of murals and graffiti art celebrating black culture and social commentary since at least the 1960s. A new mural, "The Struggle Continues" will reimagined and expand on those themes. The third node, themed "Firsts" is centered around 54th St and includes new pocket parks. Melvin Edwards' work here was done with the memory of his first sculpture ever exhibited nearby in 1963. The initial concept for the southernmost end of the project included the Crenshaw Monument, a 120-foot-tall (6.1 m) totem that spells out Crenshaw in giant letters. A work by Brenna Youngblood will be the first placed in I AM Park at Slauson Avenue.

Perkins and Will is the design firm for the project. Architect Zena Howard has more than 25 years of experience creating work designed to pay homage to Black history. What she calls “remembrance work” has included projects such as the National Museum of African American History and Culture, the Motown Museum expansion, and the International Civil Rights Center and Museum. Groundbreaking took place on Feb 29, 2020. Construction was slated for completion within a year but was delayed by the COVID-19 pandemic. The museum will have 100 permanent and temporary public artworks.

== Formation ==
The major commercial corridor for the Crenshaw district, Hyde Park and Leimert Park is known as "the heart of African American commerce in Los Angeles". The project was conceived to celebrate the Crenshaw business district as a black community amid fears of gentrification with the arrival of the K Line light rail and the NFL Stadium in Inglewood. In the midst of the transit construction and coming demographic changes, this placekeeping project celebrates being “unapologetically, authentically black.” Like Koreatown, Chinatown and Olvera Street, proponents want this project to provide an identity to this community and highlight the historic nature of South Los Angeles.

The office of Los Angeles Council member Marqueece Harris-Dawson has engaged the neighborhood in the project. He brought together leaders from South Los Angeles including artists, activists, curators, musicians, filmmakers, academics, community planners, and community organizers. The stakeholders and experts included Judith Baca, Ben Caldwell, Ron Finley, Mark Steven Greenfield, Darnell Hunt, and Nipsey Hussle before his death in March 2019. Issa Rae spoke at the groundbreaking ceremony at the end of Black History Month on February 29, 2020. Rae said this project is special to her as she is a native of the area.

The project included enhancement of Metro-owned properties along the street level light rail route. Business owners and residents were upset that the light rail trains running at street level removed parking spaces essential to the commercial area. The fence along the train tracks is a barrier that further impacts local small businesses. As the light rail line brings the possibility of gentrification, efforts are being made to ensure the project benefits the people who already live along the route. The project planned to support local businesses by providing infrastructure improvement grants for business owners who own their properties, including code compliance work, new parking spaces, building repairs and culturally stamped sidewalks. Contractors will be required to hire workers who are underrepresented minorities in the trades. The planned roll out is for a total of 100 works by emerging, mid-career, and established artists till 2027. Local artists are included in the project.

The $100 million project has received government funding from the City of Los Angeles, the State of California, and Los Angeles County. The Los Angeles County Metropolitan Transportation Authority board unanimously voted to approve $15 million for the construction of Sankofa Park as they were already responsible for site improvements including the sidewalk and curb after construction of the K Line is complete. The Getty Foundation committed $3 million in grants for artist commissions, fabrication and conservation planning for the initial seven sculptures. Steve Ballmer donated to this project and others whose grantees "are working toward racial equity, specifically within predominantly Black communities." DeMar DeRozan lead a private fundraising drive. In July 2022, a visit by Transportation Secretary Pete Buttigieg highlighted how the project will benefit from the Infrastructure Investment and Jobs Act. As of February 2023, $72 million of its $100 million goal had been raised.

== See also ==
- Lists:
  - Museums focused on African Americans
  - Museums in Los Angeles
- History of the African Americans in Los Angeles
- African Americans in California
