= List of museums in Los Angeles =

This list of museums in Los Angeles is a list of museums located within the City of Los Angeles, defined for this context as institutions (including nonprofit organizations, government entities, and private businesses) that collect and care for objects of cultural, artistic, scientific, or historical interest and make their collections or related exhibits available for public viewing. Also included are non-profit and university art galleries. Museums that exist only in cyberspace (i.e., virtual museums) are not included.

To use the sortable tables: click on the icons at the top of each column to sort that column in alphabetical order; click again for reverse alphabetical order.

== Museums ==
Name	Image	Community	Type	Summary
A+D Museum		Downtown	Architecture	Architecture and Design Museum, changing exhibits, information and education center about architecture, interior design, landscape design, fashion design and product design
Academy Museum of Motion Pictures		Wilshire	Media	Museum dedicated to the motion picture arts and the Oscars Award ceremony. Located at Wilshire Boulevard and Fairfax Avenue (formerly the May Department Store) LACMA Campus.
African American Firefighter Museum		Downtown	Firefighting	Vintage fire apparatus, stories, pictures, memorabilia of pioneering African American Los Angeles firefighters
Annenberg Space for Photography		Century City	Photography	Changing exhibits of digital and print photography
American Jewish University Art Galleries		Bel Air	Art	Platt and Borstein Art Galleries, Smalley Sculpture Garden
Andres Pico Adobe		Mission Hills	Historic house	Operated by the San Fernando Valley Historical Society
Armand Hammer Museum of Art		Westwood	Art	Also known as the Hammer Museum, collection includes French 19th-century masters, European old master paintings, American artists from the 18th to 20th centuries, works by 19th-century French satirist Honoré Daumier and contemporaries, sculpture and contemporary art
Autry Museum of the American West		Griffith Park	Culture	Museum dedicated to the art, history, and cultures of the American West. Established in 2003 following the merger of the Southwest Museum of the American Indian, the Women of the West Museum, and the Museum of the American West (formerly the Autry Museum of Western Heritage)
Avila Adobe		Downtown	Historic house	Oldest standing residence in Los Angeles, part of El Pueblo de Los Angeles Historical Monument
Banning Residence Museum		Wilmington	Historic house	Victorian mansion of Phineas Banning
Barnsdall Art Park		Los Feliz	Art	Includes the Los Angeles Municipal Art Gallery, Barnsdall Gallery Theatre, and Hollyhock House
Battleship IOWA Museum		San Pedro	Military	Operated by the Pacific Battleship Center, the USS Iowa (BB-61) served during WWII, Korean War, and the Cold War, and hosted 3 presidents (President Franklin D. Roosevelt, President Ronald Reagan, and President George H. W. Bush.)
Ben Maltz Gallery		Westchester	Art	Contemporary art gallery of Otis College of Art and Design
Bhagavad-gita Museum		Culver City	Art/Religion	Diorama displays illustrating the Bhagavad-gita, owned and operated by ISKCON
Bolton Hall Museum		Tujunga	Local history	Operated by the Little Landers Historical Society
The Broad Museum		Downtown	Art	A contemporary art museum built by philanthropists Eli and Edythe Broad
Cal State Northridge Art Galleries		Northridge	Art	Main, Summer and West galleries
California State University, Los Angeles Luckman Fine Arts Complex and Fine Arts Gallery		University Hills	Art	Harriet and Charles Luckman Fine Arts Complex for visual and performing arts, and the Fine Arts Gallery in Building 9 that is part of the Department of Art
California African American Museum		Exposition Park	African American	
California Science Center		Exposition Park	Science	
Campo de Cahuenga		Studio City	Historic house	
Catalina Island Museum		Avalon	Art and History Museum	Founded in 1953; Santa Catalina Island's only museum
Centinela Adobe		Westchester	Historic house	
Chatsworth Museum		Chatsworth	Historic house	Operated by the Chatsworth Historical Society at the Homestead Acre, late 19th-century homesteader's cottage known as the Hill-Palmer Cottage
Chinese American Museum		Downtown	Ethnic – Chinese	History and experience of Chinese Americans in the state of California, also fine art exhibits, part of El Pueblo de Los Angeles Historical Monument
Craft Contemporary		Miracle Mile	Folk Art	Located in Museum Row
Destination Crenshaw		Crenshaw Boulevard, Hyde Park	Cultural	Under-construction 1.3-mile-long (2.1 km) open-air museum preserving the history and culture of African Americans
Discovery Cube Los Angeles		Lake View Terrace	Science	Located by Hansen Dam, the museum for children to learn about science
Drum Barracks		Wilmington	Civil War	Civil War-era military facility with museum containing camp models, period displays
El Pueblo de Los Angeles Historical Monument		Downtown	Multiple	Includes Olvera Street, Avila Adobe, Chinese American Museum, Italian American Museum of Los Angeles, Plaza Firehouse Museum, Sepulveda House, changing exhibits in El Pueblo Gallery, Pico House, Hellman/Quon building
Fashion Institute of Design & Merchandising Museum		Downtown	Textile	Costumes, accessories, textiles & perfume
Flight Path Learning Center & Museum		Los Angeles Airport	Flying	Aircraft, models, photos, displays, school tours, and special programs. Library includes rare industry magazines dating to World War II and before, aircraft manuals, and historic photographs
Forest Lawn Memorial Park (Hollywood Hills)		San Fernando Valley	History	Houses the Hall Of Liberty American History Museum
Fort MacArthur Museum		San Pedro	Military	History of the fort and its role in defending the Los Angeles area
Fowler Museum		Westwood	Cultural	Part of UCLA, collections include art, ethnographic and archaeological objects representing prehistoric, historic, and contemporary cultures of Africa, Native and Latin America, and Asia and the Pacific
Franklin D. Murphy Sculpture Garden		Westwood	Art	Sculpture garden located on the campus of the University of California, Los Angeles and is run by the Hammer Museum.
Frederick R. Weisman Art Foundation		Holmby Hills	Art	Estate and gardens with collection of 20th-century art, open by appointment on guided tours
Geffen Contemporary at MOCA		Downtown	Art	Located in Little Tokyo district, branch of Museum of Contemporary Art, Los Angeles
Getty Center		Brentwood	Art	One site of the J. Paul Getty Museum, exhibits classical sculpture and art, European paintings, drawings, manuscripts, sculpture, decorative arts and photography
Getty Villa		Pacific Palisades	Cultural	Another site of the J. Paul Getty Museum, arts and cultures of ancient Greece, Rome and Etruria
Grammy Museum		Downtown	Music	Located at L.A. Live, history of the Grammy Awards and music artifacts
Grier Musser Museum		Downtown	Historic house	website, turn-of-the century Queen Anne house
Griffith Observatory		Griffith Park	Science	Exhibits include astronomy, planets, stars, the cosmos, gravity, the sun and moon
Guinness World Record Museum		Hollywood	Entertainment	website, located on Hollywood Boulevard and featuring world record breaking facts and feats.
Heritage Square Museum		Montecito Heights	Open air	Eight structures tell the story of the settlement and development of Southern California from the Civil War to the early 20th Century
Hill-Palmer Cottage		Chatsworth	Historic house	Operated by the Chatsworth Historical Society, also known as the Homestead Acre
Hollywood Bowl Museum		Hollywood	Media	Gallery of photos from performers at the Hollywood Bowl, audio and video clips, memorabilia
Hollywood Heritage Museum		Hollywood	History	Archival photographs from silent movie picture productions, movie props, historic documents and movie memorabilia
Hollywood Museum		Hollywood	Media	Over 10,000 historical costumes, props, models, set pieces and more from movies and movie stars, located in the Max Factor building
Hollywood Wax Museum		Hollywood	Wax	Wax figures of media stars, fictional characters, famous politicians and a Chamber of Horrors
Human Resources		Downtown	Art	Non-profit exhibition and performance space
Italian American Museum of Los Angeles		Downtown	Cultural	Part of El Pueblo de Los Angeles Historical Monument, history and contributions of Italian Americans in Los Angeles
Japanese American National Museum		Downtown	Ethnic – Japanese	Japanese American history, culture and art, located in Little Tokyo
Judson Studios		Highland Park	Art	Art gallery and stained glass workshops
Kleinrock Internet Heritage Site and Archive		Westwood	History	website Part of UCLA, birthplace and early history of the Internet where the first node of the ARPANET (a network that laid foundations for the modern Internet) was sent
Korean Cultural Center		Koreatown	Ethnic – Korean	Korean history and culture, changing exhibits of traditional and contemporary art
LA Plaza de Cultura y Artes		Downtown	Ethnic	Mexican-American experience in Los Angeles and Southern California, art and culture, reconstruction of 1920's Main Street vignettes
Legends' Attic		Claremont	Sports and Hollywood Memorabilia	website Legends' Attic is a premier Sports and Hollywood memorabilia gallery and store offering a unique blend of rare and iconic collectibles, creating an immersive experience for fans and collectors.
Los Angeles Contemporary Exhibitions		Hollywood	Art	Also known as LACE, contemporary art exhibition space and archive of the visual arts for the city of Los Angeles
Los Angeles County Museum of Art		Miracle Mile	Art	Includes Pavilion for Japanese Art, collections of African, Ancient Americas, American, Middle Eastern, Chinese and Korean, Contemporary, Egyptian, European, Latin American and Asian art, costumes & textiles, decorative arts and design, photography
Los Angeles Fire Department Museum and Memorial		Various	Firefighting	Old Fire Station 27 is located on Cahuenga Boulevard in Hollywood, history of the department, antique equipment and fire engines; Old Fire Station 36 is located in San Pedro, also called the Harbor Museum
Los Angeles Live Steamers Railroad Museum		Griffith Park	Railroad	Located next to Travel Town Museum, operates 7½" gauge model trains for visitors to ride, includes Walt Disney's Carolwood Barn
Los Angeles Maritime Museum		San Pedro	Maritime	Local maritime, diving and fishing industries, ship models, sailor's artifacts, local history, USS Los Angeles (CA-135)
Los Angeles Municipal Art Gallery		Los Feliz	Art	Located in Barnsdall Art Park, focus is arts and artists of Southern California
Los Angeles Museum of the Holocaust		Fairfax	History	Located in Pan Pacific Park, dedicated to educating the public and commemorating those who survived and who were lost
Los Angeles Police Museum		Highland Park	Law enforcement	Artifacts include photos, uniforms, badges, squad cars, a paddy wagon, and bullet-riddled vehicles
Los Encinos State Historic Park		Encino	History	Area agriculture history and historic adobe house
Lucas Museum of Narrative Art		Exposition Park	Narrative art	Visual storytelling, including painting, photography, sculpture, illustration, comic art, performance, and video.
Lummis House		Highland Park	Historic house	Early 20th century rock house, also known as El Alisal
Madame Tussauds Hollywood		Hollywood	Wax	
The Main Museum of Los Angeles Art		Downtown L.A.	Art	Museum dedicated to the art and artists of Los Angeles
Marciano Art Foundation			Contemporary Art	
Mission San Fernando Rey de España		Mission Hills	Religious	Includes the Archival Center Museum of the Archdiocese of Los Angeles, history of the archdiocese including exhibits about archbishops and cardinals, papal collection, art, missions, religious objects
Muller House		San Pedro	Historic house	1899 Colonial Revival house, operated by the San Pedro Bay Historical Society
Museum of Contemporary Art		Downtown	Art	Main branch is located on Grand Avenue in Museum Row, Geffen Contemporary is in the Little Tokyo district of Downtown Los Angeles, and Pacific Design Center facility is in West Hollywood
Museum of Death		Hollywood	Criminology	Located on Hollywood Boulevard, death and related topics including funerals, murder, and capital punishment
Museum of Jurassic Technology		Palms	Multiple	Unusual collection of exhibits and objects with varying and uncertain degrees of authenticity
Museum of the San Fernando Valley		Northridge	Multiple	Website, history, art, and culture of the San Fernando Valley
Museum of Selfies		Hollywood	Photography	website Interactive exhibits including the Upside Down Room, throne from Game of Thrones, red carpet walk, etc.
Museum of Tolerance		Westside	History	World racism & prejudice with a strong focus on the history of the Holocaust
Natural History Museum of Los Angeles County		Exposition Park	Natural history	Displays include animal habitats, dinosaurs, pre-Columbian cultures and the Ralph M. Parsons Discovery Center and Insect Zoo
Nethercutt Collection		Sylmar	Automobile	Over 130 antique, classic and special interest automobiles
Neutra VDL Studio and Residences		Silver Lake	Historic house	Home of architect Richard Neutra
Page Museum (La Brea Tar Pits)		Miracle Mile	Natural history	Fossils housed in the George C. Page Museum, located in Museum Row
ONE National Gay & Lesbian Archives at the University of Southern California Libraries		Downtown	LGBT Art & History	Repository of LGBT materials, presents exhibitions at its main location near the University of Southern California
Oran Z's Pan African Black Facts & Wax Museum		South Los Angeles	African American	website, wax figures, cultural artifacts from throughout the African world, black memorabilia, Blacks in advertising, Negro League baseball history, autographs, historical artifacts, reference library
Petersen Automotive Museum		Wilshire	Transportation	Vintage automobiles, history of autos in Los Angeles, automotive art, artifacts and memorabilia, located in Museum Row
Plaza Firehouse Museum		Downtown	Firefighting	Part of El Pueblo de Los Angeles Historical Monument, late 19th to early 20th century firefighting equipment, apparatus, photos, located in a historic firehouse
Point Fermin Lighthouse Historic Site and Museum		San Pedro	Maritime	Restored lighthouse museum
Psychiatry: An Industry of Death		Hollywood	Religious	Owned and operated by the Citizens Commission on Human Rights, an anti-psychiatry organization founded by the Church of Scientology
Ralph J. Bunche House		South Los Angeles	Biographical	Also known as the Ralph Bunche Peace & Heritage Center
REDCAT		Downtown	Art	Exhibition venue of the California Institute of the Arts, with public art gallery
Ripley's Believe It or Not!		Hollywood	Entertainment	Located on Hollywood Boulevard
Sepulveda House		Downtown	Local history	Part of El Pueblo de Los Angeles Historical Monument, historic house and visitor center with exhibits about the area
Skirball Cultural Center		Brentwood	Jewish	Home of the Skirball Museum with exhibits about Jewish culture, accomplishments and the history of the Jewish people in the United States
SPARC Gallery		Venice	Art	Community art center and gallery website
Southwest Museum of the American Indian		Mt. Washington	Native American	Galleries are closed for rehabilitation, but the museum still offers programs, events and a gift shop; now part of the Autry National Center
SS Lane Victory		San Pedro	Maritime	Second World War Victory ship preserved as a museum ship
Travel Town Museum		Griffith Park	Railroad	Steam locomotives and other rolling stock
USC Fisher Museum of Art		University Park	Art	Contemporary and old master exhibitions
Velveteria		Downtown	Art	Collection of velvet paintings
Watts Towers		Watts	Art	Outdoor folk art tower sculptures and adjacent Watts Towers Arts Center
Will Rogers State Historic Park		Pacific Palisades	Historic house	Ranch home of Will Rogers
Zimmer Children's Museum		Wilshire	Children's	website

== Defunct museums ==
- Animal Museum, closed May 2017
- ARCO Center for Visual Art, closed in 1984
- Children's Museum of Los Angeles, closed in 2000
- Hollywood Erotic Museum, closed in 2006
- Sports Museum of Los Angeles, closed in 2016
- VIVA Art Center – Valley Institute of Visual Art, closed in 2011
- Wells Fargo History Museum (Los Angeles), closed in 2020
