= Academy Museum of Motion Pictures =

American museum

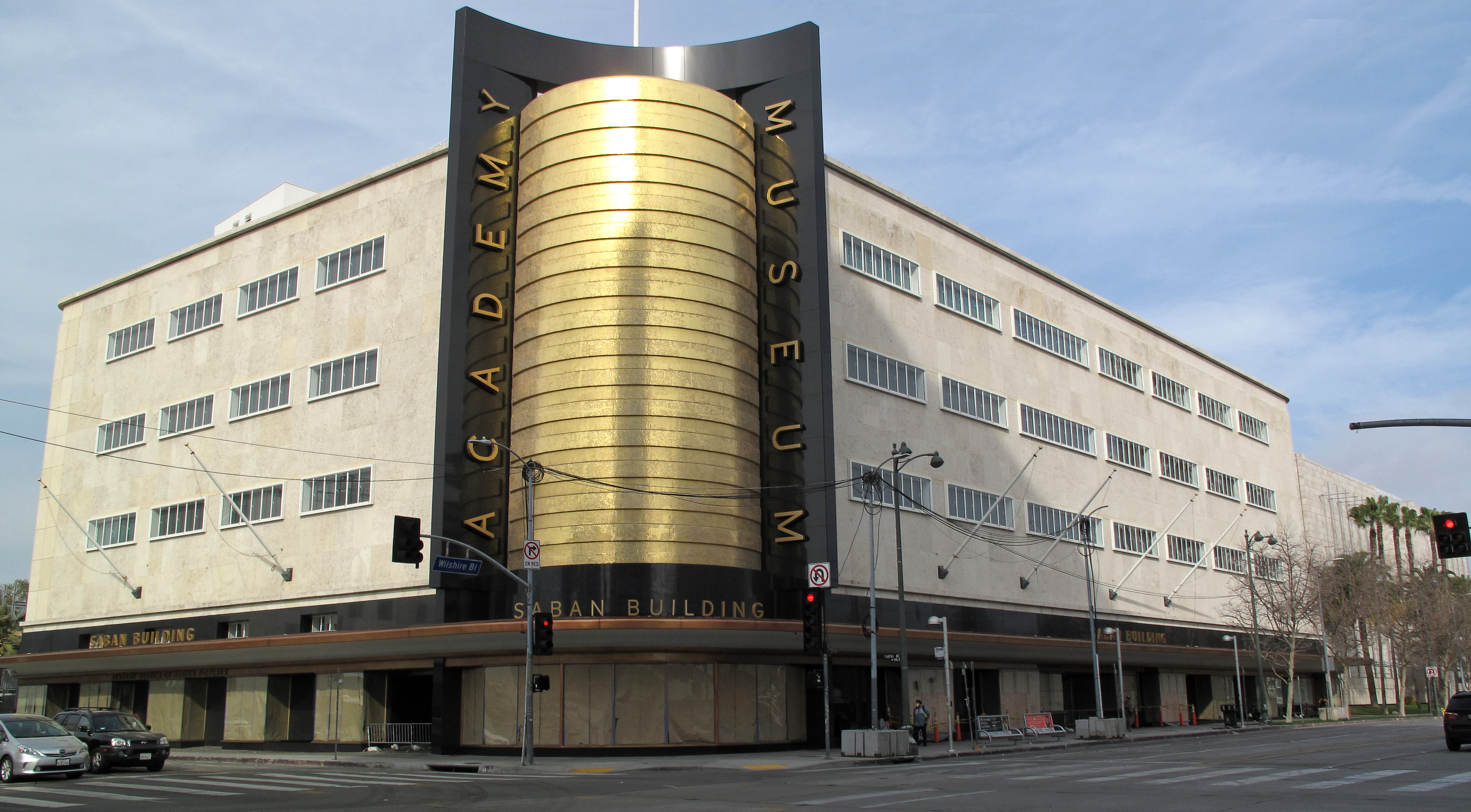
- The Saban Building, a restored 1939 Streamline Moderne May Company building (2021)
- Established: September 30, 2021
- Location: 6067 Wilshire Boulevard, Los Angeles, California, U.S.
- Coordinates: 34°3′48″N 118°21′39″W
- Type: Motion picture history
- Director: Amy Homma
- Architects: Renzo Piano; Kulapat Yantrasast
- Owner: Academy of Motion Picture Arts and Sciences
- Public transit access: Wilshire/Fairfax; 20 720
- Website: www.academymuseum.org

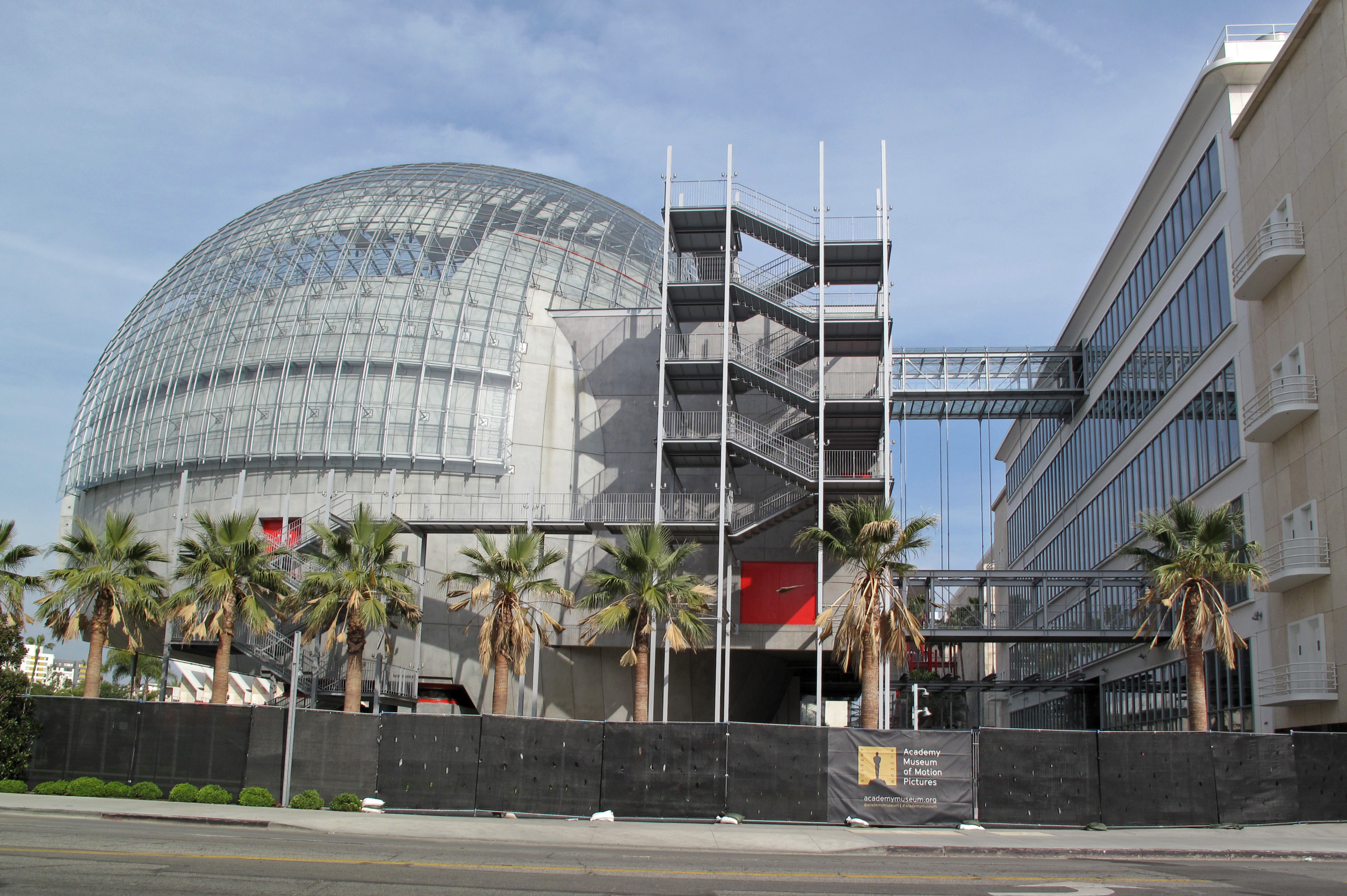
The Sphere at the Academy Museum of Motion Pictures in March 2021.

The Academy Museum of Motion Pictures is a film museum that opened in 2021 located in Los Angeles, California, United States, on Miracle Mile. The first large-scale museum of its kind in the United States, it houses part of the Academy Collection, the largest film-related collection in the world, with more than 52 million objects from notable films, and is dedicated to the arts, history, science, and artists of moviemaking and the film industry.

The museum is located in the historic May Company Building at the intersection of Wilshire Boulevard and Fairfax Avenue, part of Museum Row on the Miracle Mile. It is overseen by the Academy of Motion Picture Arts and Sciences (AMPAS).

== History ==
Originally expected to open in 2020, its completion and opening was delayed due to the COVID-19 pandemic. The museum eventually opened to selected celebrity guests on September 25, 2021, and to the public on September 30.

The museum's first temporary exhibition was dedicated to the legendary animator Hayao Miyazaki, offering an extensive display of his work and celebrating his remarkable contributions to cinema.

In April 2020, the museum opened the exhibition featuring costumes from Debbie Reynolds, and her costume conservation studio.

Soon after its opening in September 2021, the museum attracted criticism for a perceived lack of focus on Jewish industry pioneers such as Carl Laemmle and Jack Warner, as first reported by Sharon Rosen Leib in The Forward. Anti-Defamation League (ADL) CEO Jonathan Greenblatt expressed his disappointment, stating "I would've hoped that any honest historical assessment of the motion picture industry — its origins, its development, its growth — would include the role that Jews played in building the industry from the ground up". Rolling Stone, Bill Maher and Bari Weiss also raised the issue. In January 2022, the Academy Museum announced plans to create a permanent exhibit dedicated to Jewish industry pioneers.

In September 2021 the museum hosted its inaugural gala, which is the major fundraising event that supports its programing, exhibitions and educational initiatives.

On July 14, 2022, the museum voluntarily recognized Academy Museum Workers United as the bargaining representative for 160 of its employees.

== Design ==
The design of the museum was overseen by Italian architect Renzo Piano. The exterior of the May Company building, now dedicated as the Saban Building following a $50 million donation from Cheryl and Haim Saban, was refurbished with new limestone, as well as new gold leaf tiles for its corner "cylinder".

Inside the Saban Building, the Sidney Poitier Grand Lobby features the Spielberg Family Gallery. Additionally, the Shirley Temple Education Studio is devoted to workshops on filmmaking, and include a collection of items and memorabilia from Shirley Temple's career.

A spherical structure was built as an extension of the main Saban Building, connected via skyways, which features the glass-domed Dolby Family Terrace. The museum features two theater halls that are used for film screenings, programming, and other special events; the 945-seat David Geffen Theater in the Sphere, and the smaller, 277-seat Ted Mann Theater in the lower level of the Saban Building.

== Academy Museum Gala ==
Academy Museum Gala is conducted every year to raise funds by public display of cinematic experience that includes showing filmmaking process in a raw form, or showing history of cinema.

The 2021 Academy Museum Opening Gala honored Haile Gerima and Sophia Loren as well as Academy Museum Campaign Leaders Annette Bening, Bob Iger, and Tom Hanks.

The 2022 Academy Museum Gala honored Julia Roberts, Miky Lee, Sir Steve McQueen, and Tilda Swinton.

The 2023 Academy Museum Gala honored Meryl Streep, Michael B. Jordan, Oprah Winfrey, and Sofia Coppola and raised $10 million.

The 2024 Academy Museum Gala celebrated the museum’s third anniversary and honored Oscar-nominated actor Paul Mescal; Oscar-winning actress, singer, and dancer Rita Moreno; and Oscar-winning writer and director Quentin Tarantino.

The 2025 Academy Museum Gala honorees were Oscar-winning actress Penélope Cruz, director Walter Salles, Oscar-winning musician Bruce Springsteen and actor and comedian Bowen Yang.

The 2026 Academy Museum Gala honorees were director John Carpenter, Oscar-nominated actor Colman Domingo, and Oscar-winning actress Charlize Theron.

== Collections ==
The Academy Museum Collection is part of the Academy Collection, holding more than 52 million objects including costumes, costume sketches, film reels, posters, props, and screenplays. In May 2020, the museum purchased the May Queen dress worn by Florence Pugh in Midsommar (2019) for $65,000, as part of a charity auction held by A24 to benefit COVID-19 relief efforts.

Some key objects in the Museum's collection include:

- A cape used by Bela Lugosi in Dracula (1931)
- Shirley Temple's tap shoes from The Little Colonel (1935)
- Dorothy's ruby slippers from The Wizard of Oz (1939)
- Tablets from The Ten Commandments (1956)
- Typewriter used to write the screenplay for Psycho (1960)
- The Aries 1B spaceship model and a space suit worn by Keir Dullea in 2001: A Space Odyssey (1968)
- The only surviving shark mold from Jaws (1975)
- An E.T. prop from E.T. the Extra-Terrestrial (1982)
- The yellow dress worn by Emma Stone in La La Land (2016)
- The costume of the amphibian man from The Shape of Water (2017)
- Pillars named for people of historical significance in motion picture history including Rita Moreno, Cher, Barbra Streisand, and Hattie McDaniel.

== Exhibitions ==
=== Stories of Cinema ===
The first, second and third floors of the museum feature the Academy Museum's primary exhibition "Stories of Cinema". This includes deep dives on Citizen Kane, editor Thelma Schoonmaker, filmmaker Oscar Micheaux, Real Women Have Curves, cinematographer Emmanuel Lubezski, filmmaker Spike Lee, The Wizard of Oz, filmmaker Pedro Almodovar and more. Galleries also feature Casablanca, Boyz n the Hood, documentarian Lourdes Portillo, Animation, and "The Art of Moviemaking: The Godfather" and "Director’s Inspiration: Agnès Varda."

The inaugural temporary collection of the Marilyn and Jeffrey Katzenberg Gallery was devoted to Japanese animator Hayao Miyazaki. The exhibition opened on September 30, 2021, and was on view until June 5, 2022. This was the first time Miyazaki’s work was featured in a major retrospective in the United States. The collection also displayed pieces on public view for the first time outside of Japan. The 11,000-square-foot exhibition features more than 300 objects, including original image boards, character designs, storyboards, layouts, backgrounds, posters, and cels. The exhibition’s curators, Jessica Niebel and assistant curator J. Raúl Guzmán worked with Studio Ghibli and the Ghibli Museum in Japan to gather all the materials. There are interactive installations displayed throughout the exhibit, the “Mother Tree,” Skyview, and Magical Forest, to name a few, each inspired by a different Miyazaki Film.

After the Hayao Miyazaki exhibition, the museum presented Regeneration: Black Cinema 1898-1971, which explored the history of Black participation in American cinema from its beginnings to just beyond the civil rights movement.

Following Regeneration, the museum opened John Waters: Pope of Trash, the first comprehensive exhibition dedicated to the filmmaker, exploring his process, themes, and style.

The Academy Museum also debuted with The Path to Cinema: Highlights from the Richard Balzer Collection. This was replaced in May 2024, when the museum opened its first permanent exhibition, "Hollywoodland: Jewish Founders and the Making of a Movie Capital".

Later in 2024, the Museum opened "Color in Motion: Chromatic Explorations of Cinema", investigating the role of color in film, from the scientific and technological advancements that made it possible, to its impact on viewers and uses by filmmakers. The Museum also created "Cyberpunk: Envisioning Possible Futures Through Cinema", which examined the influence of the science fiction subgenre cyberpunk on cinema culture, featuring the films and futuristic themes known internationally and across generations.

Galleries in the museum are dedicated to a variety of topics. Inaugural galleries covered:

- Pedro Almodóvar
- Citizen Kane
- Climate change
- Black Lives Matter
- Blackface, redface, and yellowface
- Labor relations
- Bruce Lee
- Spike Lee
- #MeToo
- Oscar Micheaux
- Racism and sexism in animation
- Real Women Have Curves (2002)
- Thelma Schoonmaker
  - The Wizard of Oz
- History of Animation
- Oscars History

An area featuring Oscar statuettes is dedicated to historic Oscar winners, including Ang Lee, Barry Jenkins, Sidney Poitier, Billy Wilder, Alfonso Cuarón, Richard Edlund, Buffy Sainte-Marie and more.

A "largely uncritical" exhibit on the history of the film industry, slated to be called "Where Dreams Are Made: A Journey Inside the Movies", was scrapped by Kramer to be replaced with a more "complex, complete" exhibit.

=== Academy Museum Publications ===
The Museum publishes catalogues with each exhibition, devoted to the subjects and content:

- Hayao Miyazaki
- Pedro Almodóvar: Installation
- Spike Lee: Director’s Inspiration

== Theaters ==
The Museum houses two movie theaters: the 952-seat David Geffen Theater and the 277-seat Ted Mann Theatre. Both theaters feature state-of-the art equipment for public screening programs, live performances and film premiers. The David Geffen theatre can show 16, 35 and 70-millimeter film formats with Dolby sound.

=== Public Programs ===
The museum also features year-round film programming and screenings, with some examples including:

- Burden of Dreams in 4K, presented by Werner Herzog
- Teen Apocalypse Trilogy with Gregg Araki in-person
- 30th anniversary of Clueless in 35mm
- Godzilla-thon movie marathon
- May the 4th annual Star Wars-themed celebration
- The Virgin Suicides book signing with Sofia Coppola

=== Film and television premieres ===
The museum is also a site for Los Angeles premieres of new films and television series. Films and series that have held premieres here include:

- Last Night in Soho (2021)
- Belfast (2021)
- House of Gucci (2021)
- Nightmare Alley (2021)
- Being the Ricardos (2021)
- WeCrashed (2022)
- Ambulance (2022)
- House of the Dragon (2022)
- Glass Onion: A Knives Out Mystery (2022)
- Babylon (2022)
- The 1619 Project (2023)
- Elemental (2023)
- May December (2023)
- Maestro (2023)
- The Color Purple (2023)
- The Book of Clarence (2023)
- Shōgun (2024)
- Queens (2024)
- Civil War (2024)
- Apples Never Fall (2024)
- Rhett & Link's 'Wonderhole' (2024)
- We Were the Lucky Ones (2024)
- Road Diary: Bruce Springsteen and The E Street Band (2024)
- Nightbitch (2024)
- The Studio (2025)
- How to Train Your Dragon (2025)
- Percy Jackson and the Olympians (2025)

== Board of trustees ==
The museum's initial board of trustees included:

- Eric Esrailian
- Laura Dern
- Whoopi Goldberg
- Tom Hanks
- Ryan Murphy
- Ted Sarandos
- Diane von Fürstenberg

== Community partners ==
- Armenian Film Society – a film society dedicated to Armenian cinema
- F.L.U.I.D. – a production company, film fund and community resource dedicated to LGBTQIA+ cinema
- Ghetto Film School – a film school

== See also ==
- List of museums in Los Angeles
