= Gardena Cinema =

Movie theater in Gardena, California

Coordinates: 33°53′45.5″N 118°19′34.5″W

Gardena Cinema is an 800-seat, single-screen movie theater located on Crenshaw Boulevard, Gardena, California.

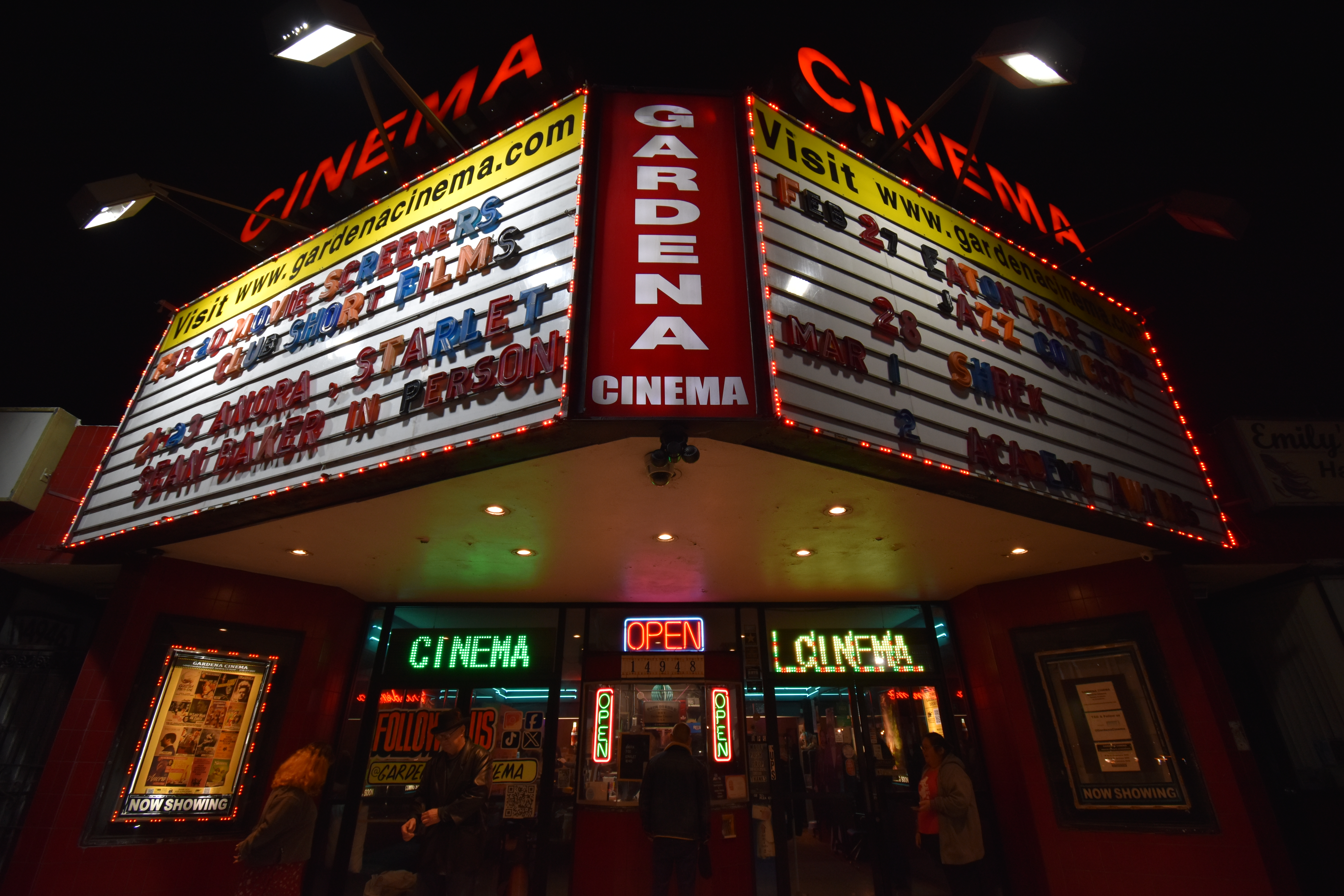
The façade of the Gardena Cinema.

== History ==
The theater was built in 1946. In 1976, the Kim family, South Korean emigrants, purchased the theater.

In 2023, local fans of the theater rallied support for the theater in response to it being listed for sale. The community aims for the theater to be preserved. In 2023, the Los Angeles Asian Pacific Film Festival held a screening at the movie theater. As of May 2023, Judy Kim, who runs the cinema her parents bought, is in the process of filing for nonprofit status to keep the business afloat while her family looks for a buyer.

Gardena Cinema is the last single-screen theater in the South Bay.

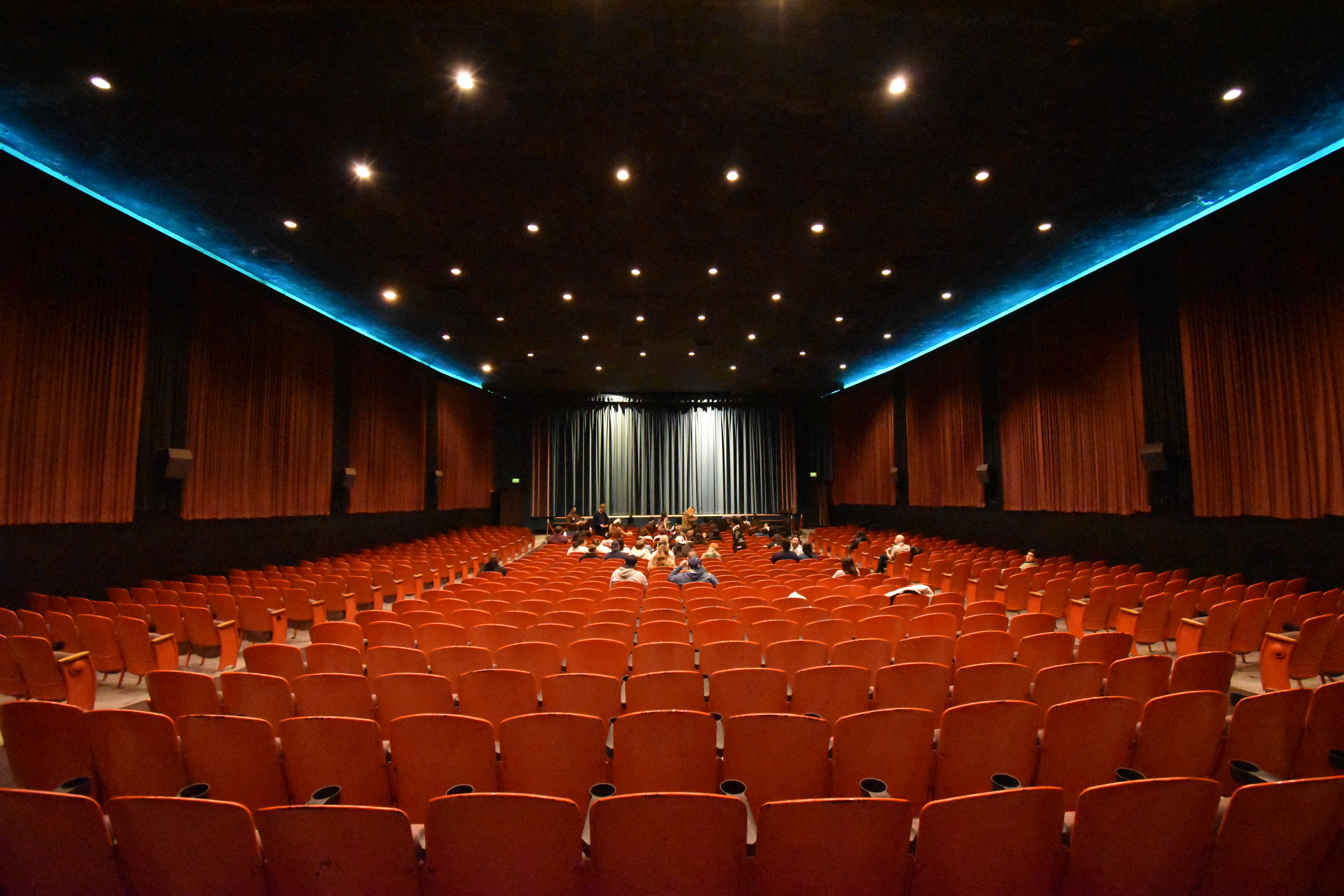
The screen.

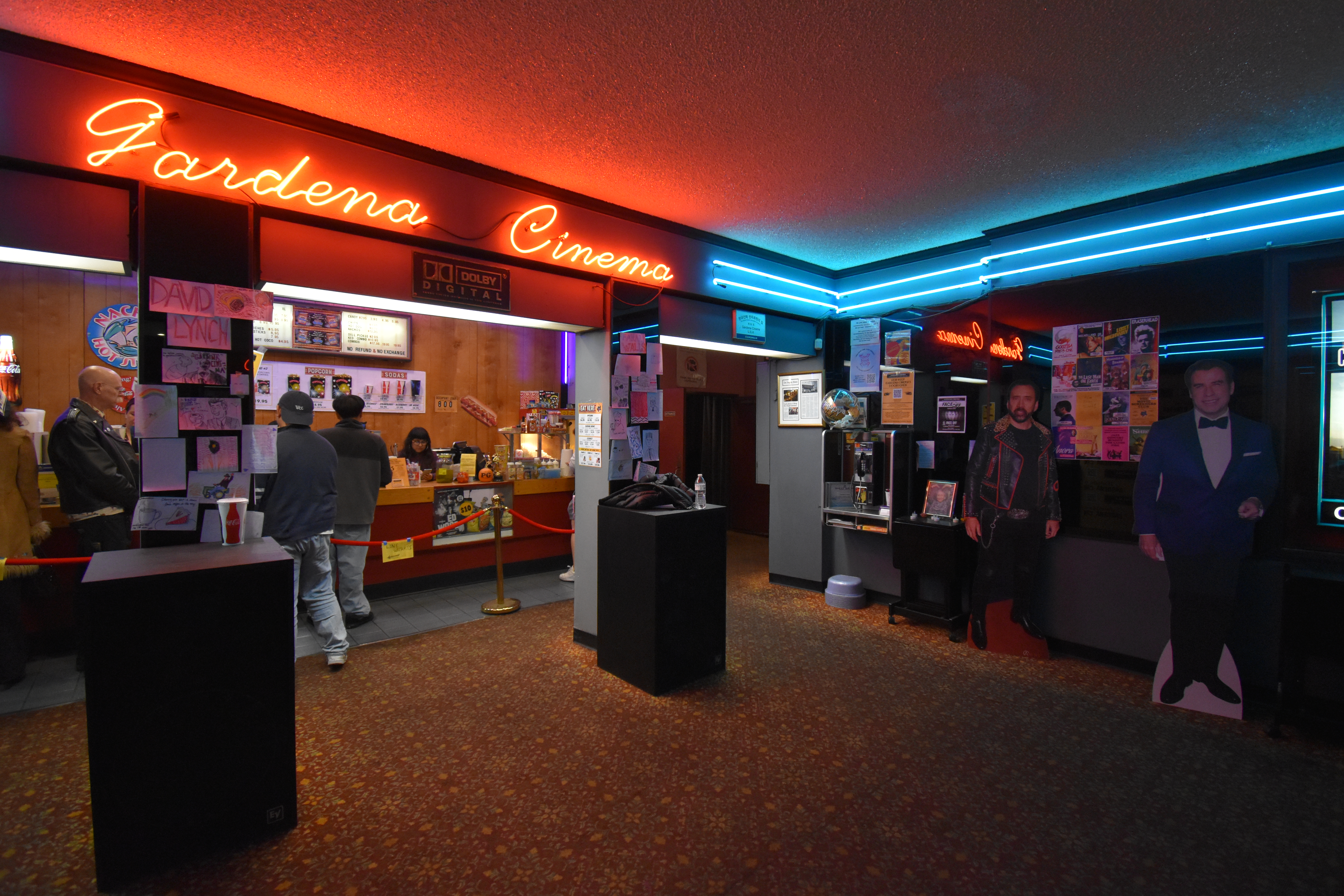
The lobby and the concession stand.

== See also ==
- Independent movie theater
- Neighborhood theatre
