= Crenshaw Boulevard =

Major street in Los Angeles

- Former name: Angeles Mesa Drive
- Namesake: George L. Crenshaw
- Maintained by: Bureau of Street Services, City of L.A. DPW
- Length: 23.46 mi (37.76 km)
- Location: Los Angeles County, California, U.S.
- Nearest metro station: : Crenshaw; Expo/Crenshaw; Martin Luther King Jr.; Leimert Park; Hyde Park
- North end: Wilshire Boulevard in Los Angeles
- South end: Burrell Lane in Rancho Palos Verdes

Other
- Known for: Baldwin Hills Crenshaw Plaza; Destination Crenshaw

Crenshaw Boulevard is a north–south thoroughfare that runs through Crenshaw and other neighborhoods along a 23-mile (37 km) route in the west-central part of Los Angeles, California, United States.

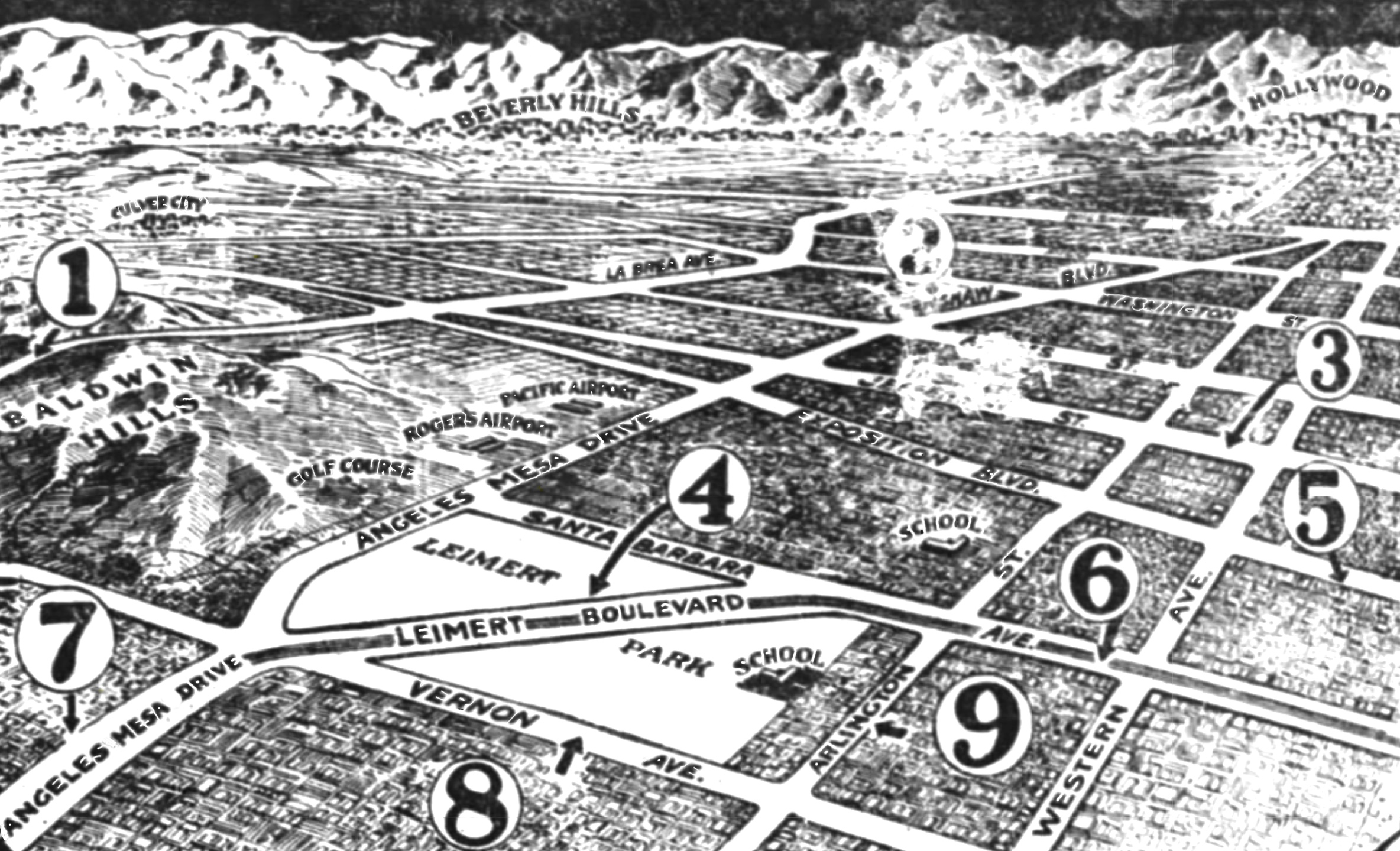
Angeles Mesa Drive, as shown (7) on this 1927 Los Angeles Times map, was the original name of Crenshaw Boulevard south of Adams Street.

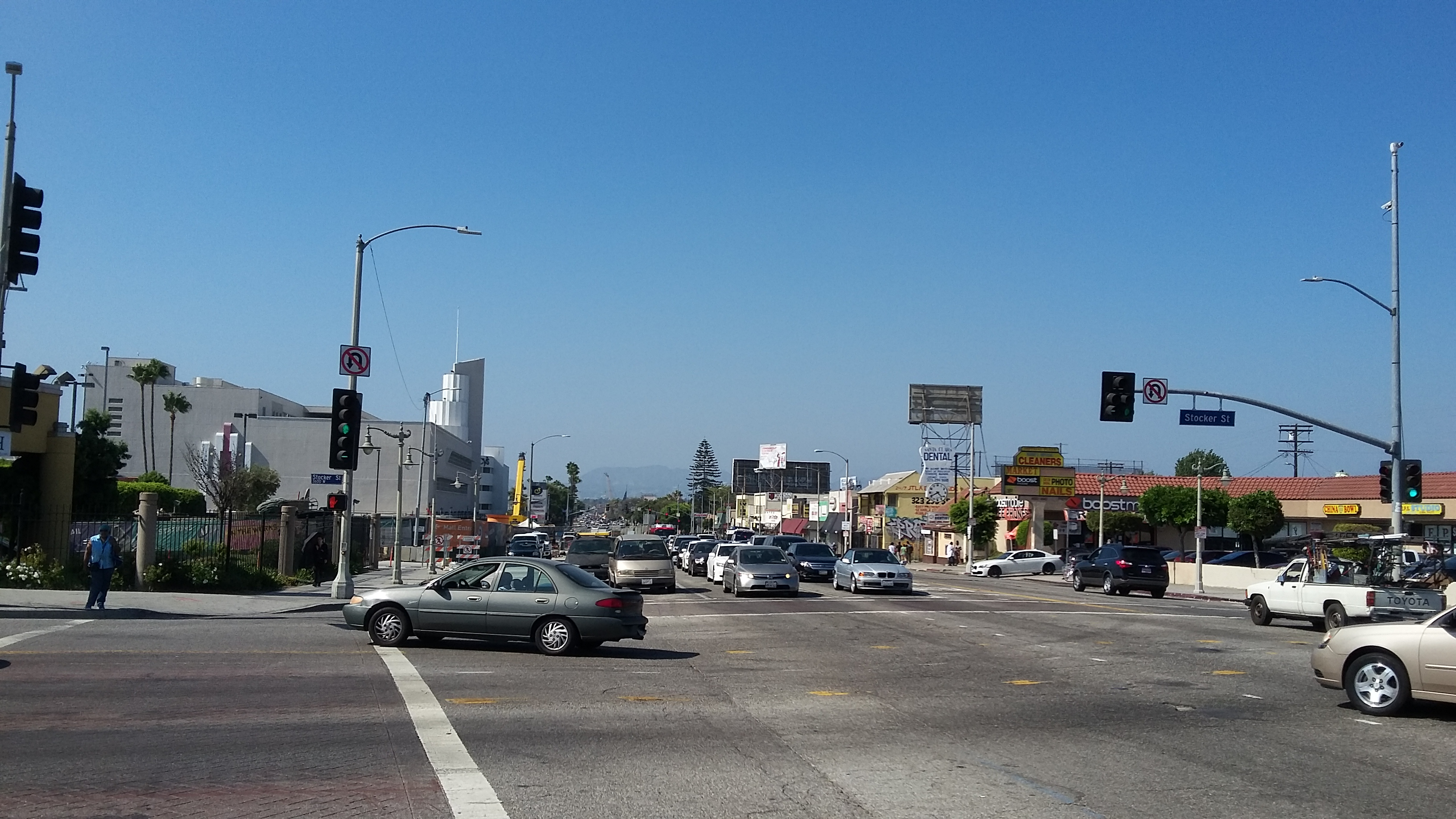
Crenshaw Boulevard at Stocker Street, 2016

The street extends between Wilshire Boulevard in Mid-Wilshire, Los Angeles, on the north and Rolling Hills, on the south. Crenshaw marks the eastern boundaries of Torrance, and Hawthorne and the western border of Gardena.

The commercial corridor in the Hyde Park neighborhood is known as "the heart of African American commerce in Los Angeles".

== History ==
Crenshaw Boulevard was named after banker and Los Angeles real estate developer George Lafayette Crenshaw who also developed the Lafayette Square.

The southern end of Crenshaw Boulevard was at Adams Street until 1916–1918, when the road was extended between Adams on the north and Slauson Avenue on the south that was then known as Angeles Mesa Drive. The extension saved three miles (4.8 km) in travel over the nearest through road (Western Avenue) and five miles (8.0 km) over the nearest paved road (Vermont Avenue).

The street became a major transportation route with tracks for the 5 Line streetcar line in the median between Leimert Boulevard on the north close to Florence Avenue on the south. With the abandonment of the streetcar system in the 1950s, the railway median was narrowed, the driving lanes improved and the street reconfigured for automobiles, buses and trucks.

=== Revitalization project ===
Many local residents were disappointed that 71 mature street-line trees were cut down in 2012 to make way for the Space Shuttle Endeavour to be moved from LAX to the California Science Center in nearby Exposition Park. About 1,000 10 to 14 foot (3.0 to 4.3 m) high trees were replanted in 2013. The construction of the K Line required the removal of additional trees in 2014. City officials promised that more trees would be planted than were removed. The improvements include bike lanes, wider sidewalks, new Metro bus stops, LED traffic lights and street lights. The revitalization was coordinated with the construction of Destination Crenshaw. A 1.3-mile-long (2.1 km) portion of Crenshaw Boulevard in the Hyde Park and Leimert Park neighborhoods will become an open-air museum dedicated to preserving the history and culture of African Americans. The project includes pocket parks, outdoor sculptures, murals, street furniture, and landscaping.

=== Malcolm X Route ===
In 2023, a five-mile stretch (8.0 km) of Crenshaw Boulevard in Leimert Park, transacting the Rosa Parks Freeway, Obama Boulevard, Martin Luther King Jr. Boulevard, and Nipsey Hussle Square, was designated Malcolm X Route in honor of the minister and civil rights leader.

== Transportation ==
=== Metro Local ===
Metro Local lines 40 and 210, and Torrance Transit line 10 serve Crenshaw Boulevard; Metro line 210 run through the majority of Crenshaw Boulevard to Artesia Boulevard, Metro line 40 from Crenshaw District to Hyde Park, and Torrance Transit line 10 south of Artesia Boulevard. The Metro C Line serves the Crenshaw station on Crenshaw Boulevard underneath Interstate 105, while the Metro E and K Lines serves Expo/Crenshaw station at the intersection with Exposition Boulevard.

In the Crenshaw district, Crenshaw Boulevard and Baldwin Hills Crenshaw Plaza are served primarily by LADOT buses, trolleys, and a light rail subway line Los Angeles County Metropolitan Transportation Authority bus lines that are:

- Metro Local Line 40 - South Bay Galleria - Patsaouras Transit Plaza via Martin Luther King Boulevard and Hawthorne Boulevard
- Metro Local Line 210 - South Bay Galleria - Hollywood/Vine B Line Station via Crenshaw Boulevard, Rossmore Avenue, and Vine Street

Crenshaw Boulevard is also briefly served in the Crenshaw district by the following LA Metro lines:

- Metro Local Line 102 - LAX City Bus Center to Huntington Park via La Tijera Boulevard, Stocker Street, Exposition Boulevard and Jefferson Boulevard
- Metro Local Line 105 - West Hollywood - Vernon via La Cienega Boulevard, Barack Obama Boulevard and Vernon Avenue

The Metro K Line runs along the Crenshaw Boulevard alignment from the E Line to 67th Street, serving three more additional stations:

- Martin Luther King Jr
- Leimert Park
- Hyde Park

=== LADOT ===
Crenshaw Boulevard is served by these LADOT Dash lines:

- LADOT Crenshaw - Stocker and Coliseum via La Brea
- LADOT Leimert Park/Slauson - Down King Boulevard via Crenshaw Blvd
- LADOT Midtown - Down Crenshaw Blvd

== Notable landmarks ==
- The intersection of Slauson Avenue and Crenshaw Boulevard was named Ermias “Nipsey Hussle” Asghedom Square in April 2019 to honor him and his contributions to the neighborhood.
- Baldwin Hills Crenshaw Plaza – Shopping mall in Los Angeles, California
- Destination Crenshaw, 1.3-mile-long (2.1-kilometer) open-air museum of African American history and culture
- Crenshaw Square - historic outdoor shopping plaza
- Crenshaw High School
- The Holiday Bowl was a bowling alley and café known for being a center of ethnic diversity during the 1960s and 1970s. It featured a sushi bar known as the Sakiba Lounge with live musical acts with a Modernist Googie architecture style. It is City of Los Angeles Historic Cultural Monument #688.
- SpaceX Headquarters
- Gardena Cinema, last single-screen theater in the South Bay
