= Ingrid Calame =

American artist (born 1965)

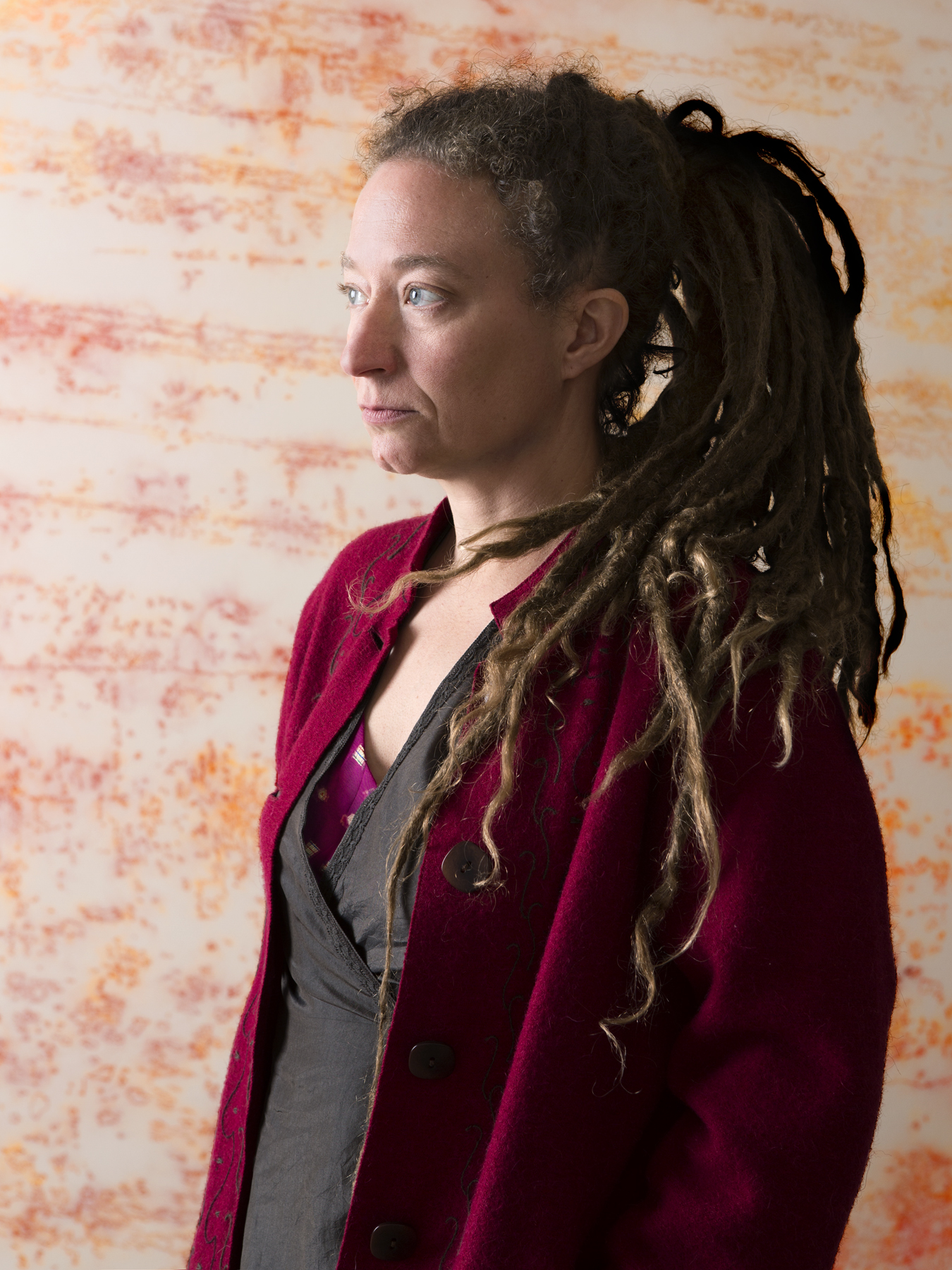
- Calame in 2013
- Born: 1965 (age 60–61); The Bronx, New York City, United States
- Education: State University of New York at Purchase; California Institute of the Arts
- Known for: Painting
- Style: Abstract art
- Website: ingridcalame.net

Ingrid Calame (born 1965) is an American artist based in Los Angeles, known for her abstract, map-like paintings inspired by human detritus. Her works are in the permanent collections of museums worldwide including the Los Angeles Museum of Contemporary Art, the Whitney Museum of American Art in New York City, the Museum of Modern Art in New York City, and the Kunstmuseum St. Gallen, Switzerland, as well as many private collections. Calame was included in the 2000 Whitney Biennial.

== Biography ==
=== Early life ===
Calame was born in 1965 in The Bronx, New York. She grew up in Westchester County, where her mother was a physical therapist and her father taught physical education. In college, Calame studied dance before shifting to painting. She graduated with a Bachelor of Fine Arts from the State University of New York at Purchase and later, a Master of Fine Arts (MFA) in art and film from the California Institute of the Arts.

=== Career ===
Shortly after earning her MFA in 1996, Calame began a series of paintings based on the accidental spills on her studio floor. In creating the series, Calame re-presented spontaneous spills as deliberately created art; this technique became a cornerstone of Calame's artistic process going forward. At the same time as Calame began developing this artistic technique, revelations about her grandmother's death impelled her to investigate the subject of human mortality. Calame increasingly chose to concentrate her artistic work on exhibiting "the ever-presence of our mortality and the almost equally human need to hide or not to see it," through tracing stains on streets and the floors of public spaces.

In 2007, Calame was invited to produce a site-specific commission at the Indianapolis Museum of Art. Out of that initial commission grew an entire exhibit, organized by the IMA's curator of contemporary art, Lisa Freiman, and titled:"Ingrid Calame: Traces of the Indianapolis Motor Speedway." The exhibit comprised several large colored-pencil drawings and enamel-on-aluminum paintings utilizing tracings of tire marks on the Indianapolis Motor Speedway. The centerpiece of the exhibit was a 76-by-20-foot enamel and latex wall painting of the pretzel-shaped skid mark made by Dan Wheldon in 2005 after winning the Indianapolis 500.

In 2008, Calame became the Albright-Knox Art Gallery's first artist-in-residence. During her residence, Calame and a group of assistants traced marks left on sites in and around Buffalo: on the floor of an ArcelorMittal Steel plant, on the Gallery's parking lot, and in a dilapidated wading pool. The results became a series of paintings and drawings organized into the exhibit, "Ingrid Calame: Step on a Crack..."

Calame's work has been the subject of solo exhibitions at the Albright-Knox Art Gallery, the Indianapolis Museum of Art, Institute of Contemporary Art, Philadelphia, the Monterey Museum of Art, the Art Gallery of Ontario, and Kunstverein Hannover, in Germany.

Her artwork is incorporated into the Leimert Park station of the Los Angeles Metro Rail system.

== Artistic style ==
Calame's works are often boldly-colored, multi-layered abstractions derived from human detritus, stains, and graffiti. Calame has stated that while her paintings and drawings are not maps, "they come from an impossible, cartographic impulse. I can't know the whole world, but going out into the world is really important to me, to try to know it through a kind of micro-mapping." Noting the map-like aspects of Calame's works, art historians Gayle Clemans and Katharine Harmon featured Calame in their book The Map as Art: Contemporary Artists Explore Cartography.
