= Vision Theatre =

Performing Arts Center and former movie theater in Leimert Park, CA

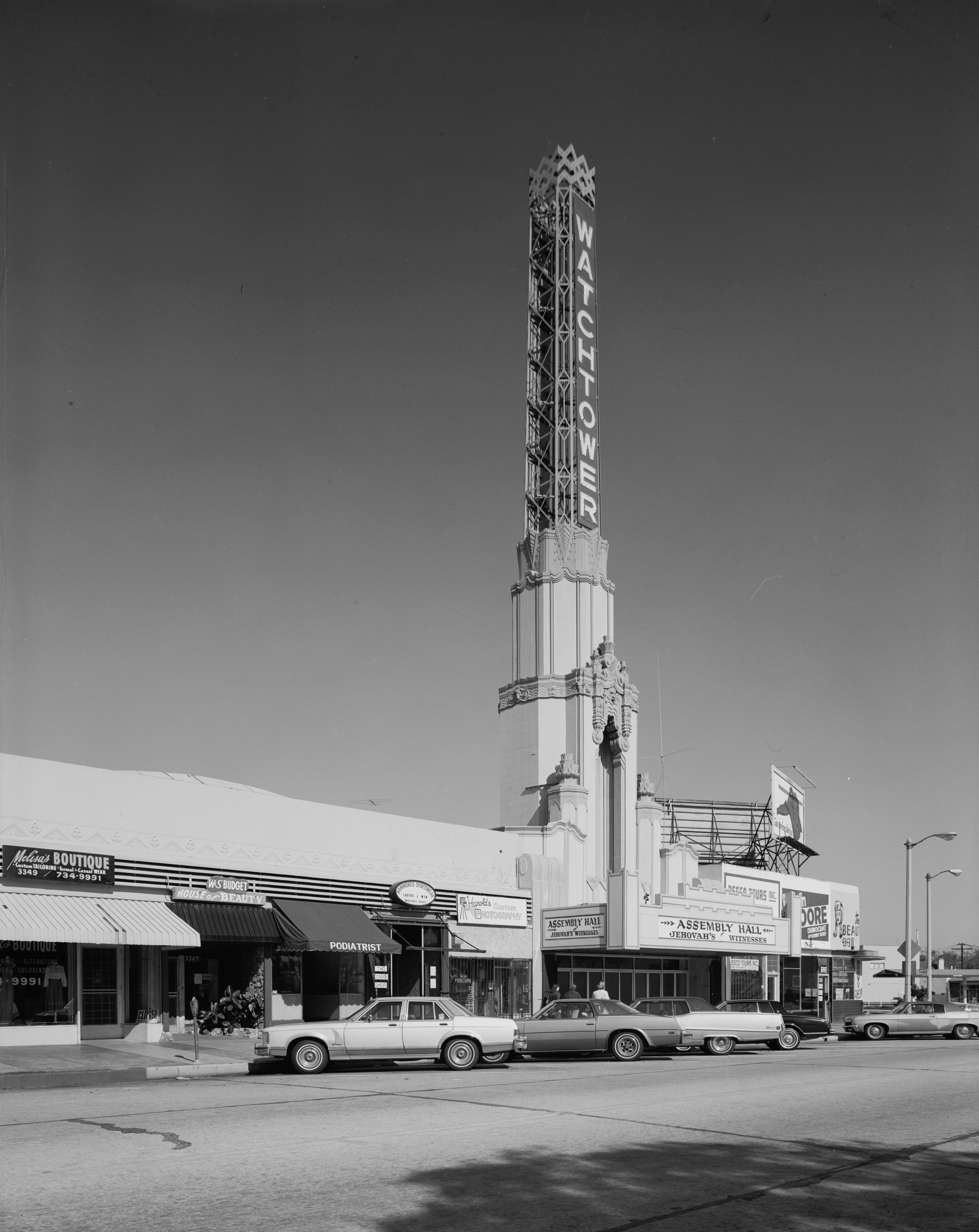
- The theater in 1972
- Interactive map of Vision Theatre
- Former names: Leimert Theatre
- Address: 3314 West 43rd Place; Los Angeles
- Coordinates: 34.0044°N 118.3301°W
- Capacity: 729
- Type: Indoor theatre
- Public transit: Leimert Park

Construction
- Built: 1931
- Opened: 1932
- Renovated: 2011-2026
- Closed: 1968
- Architect: Morgan, Walls and Clements

Vision Theatre, formerly Leimert Theatre and the Watchtower, also known as Vision Theatre Performing Arts Center, is a performing arts theater and former movie theater located at 3314 West 43rd Place in the Leimert Park neighborhood of Los Angeles, California.

== History ==
Leimert Theatre, built in 1931 and opened in 1932, was proposed by Walter H. Leimert, designed by Morgan, Walls and Clements, and owned by Howard Hughes and Fox West Coast Theatres, who sold it to Westland Theaters before construction was completed. The theater was originally designed to seat 1,100 spectators; however this was lowered to 729 to allow for more room between rows of seats.

Leimert Theatre remained in operation as a first-run movie theater until 1968. In 1977, it was purchased by Jehovah's Witnesses. It was renamed the Watchtower around this time.

Actress Marla Gibbs purchased the theater in 1990, after which she converted it to a live theater and renamed it Vision Theatre. Gibbs invested about $2.5 million into the theater, which she owned until 1997, when she was unable to pay off about $250,000 ($501,399 in 2025) in bank debts. The theater was subsequently purchased by the City of Los Angeles.

In 2011, the theater underwent an $11 million ($15.4 million in 2025) conversion to a performing arts center, paid for by the City of Los Angeles and the California Cultural and Historical Endowment. Final construction began in 2015, and the cost had increased to $40 million by the mid-2020s. The restoration was completed in August 2026.

In 2025, the Los Angeles Department of Cultural Affairs partnered with Tina Knowles's Where Art Can Occur to co-manage and co-operate the theater once construction is completed.

== Architecture and design ==
Vision Theater's exterior features a streamlined Spanish Colonial Revival rendition of Art Deco. It also features a 115-foot (35 m) steel framed tower with the theater's name on it. Inside, the theater's lobby featured a mural of Samson and Delilah by Andre Durenceau and ceilings designed by Anthony Heinsbergen.

In 2015, the building was deemed eligible by the city of Los Angeles for inclusion in local, state, and national historic registries. The city described the building as an "excellent example of a neighborhood theatre from the early 1930s" and an "excellent example of Art Deco architecture, conveying high quality craftmanship and design."
