= Hyde Park station (Los Angeles Metro) =

Light rail station in Los Angeles, California

Hyde Park
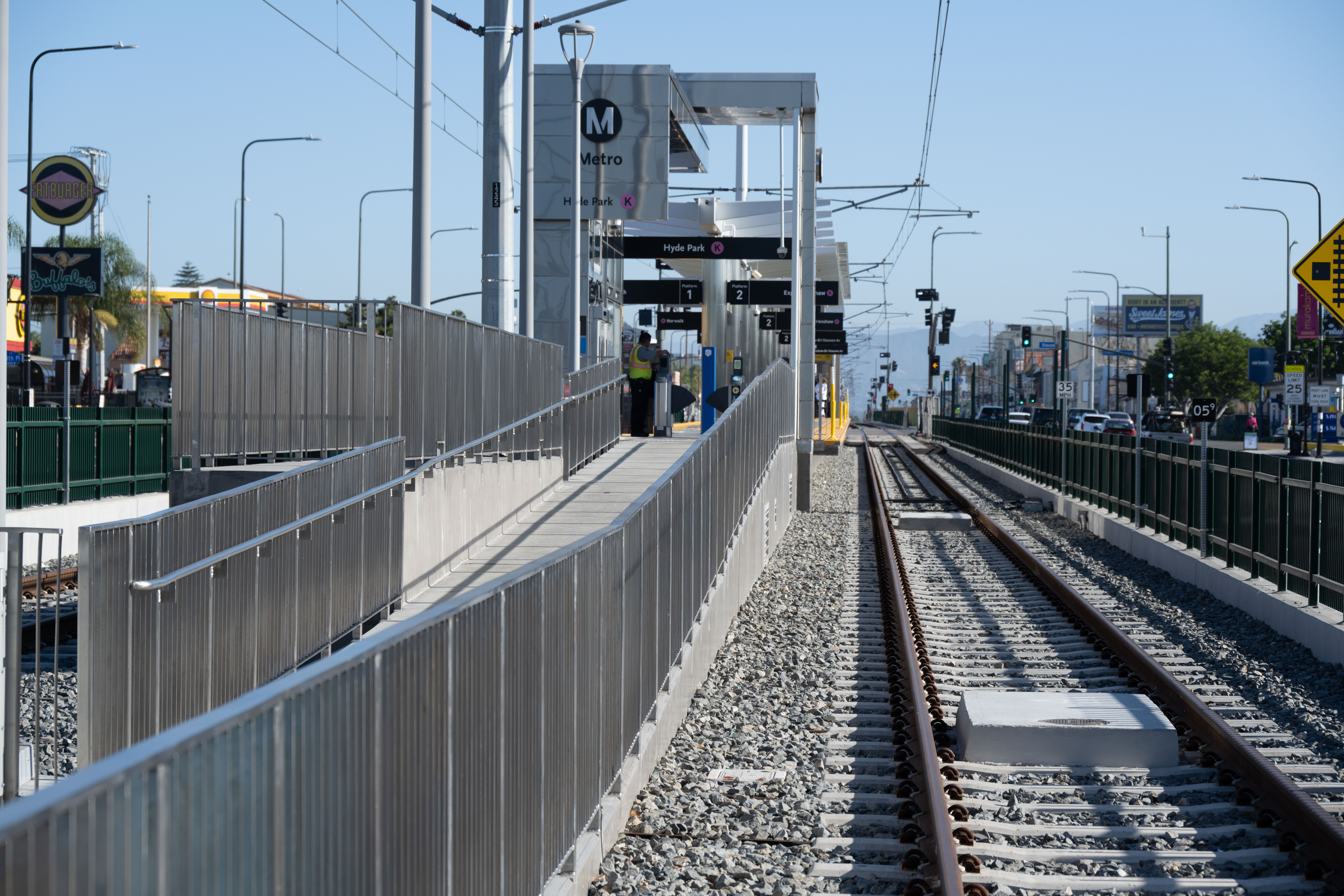
- Entrance to Hyde Park station in August 2022

General information
- Location: 5835 South Crenshaw Boulevard; Los Angeles, California
- Coordinates: 33.987906°N 118.330838°W
- Owner: Los Angeles County Metropolitan Transportation Authority
- Platforms: 1 island platform
- Tracks: 2
- Connections: Los Angeles Metro Bus; LADOT DASH

Construction
- Structure type: At-grade
- Accessible: Yes

History
- Opened: October 7, 2022

Passengers
- FY 2025: 394 (avg. wkdy boardings)

Services
Preceding station	Metro Rail	Following station
Leimert Park toward Expo/Crenshaw	K Line	Fairview Heights toward Redondo Beach
Location

Hyde Park station is an at-grade light rail station on the K Line of the Los Angeles Metro Rail system. It is located in the median of Crenshaw Boulevard between its intersections with Slauson Avenue and 59th Street in the Hyde Park neighborhood of Los Angeles.

During planning, the station was known as "Crenshaw/Slauson", with Metro adopting the current name in July 2015 in response to local feedback.

The station opened on October 7, 2022. Metro held a ceremonial ribbon cutting ceremony for the station on August 6, 2022.

The station features art by Carlson Hatton that visually celebrates the musical heritage of the area.

== Service ==
=== Hours and frequency ===
K Line service hours are approximately from 4:30 a.m. until 12:00 a.m. daily. Trains operate every 10 minutes throughout most of the day. Trains run every 20 minutes after 8:00 p.m. every day and before 8:00 a.m. on weekends.

=== Connections ===
As of June 6, 2025, the following connections are available:

- Los Angeles Metro Bus: 40, 108, 210
- LADOT DASH: Leimert/Slauson

== Notable places nearby ==
The station is within walking distance of the following notable places:

- Nipsey Hussle's The Marathon Clothing Company and memorial
- View Park Preparatory High School
