= Zena Howard =

American architect

Zena Howard, FAIA, is an American architect. She has overseen a number of high-profile projects, including the design of the National Museum of African American History and Culture in Washington, D.C. and the International Civil Rights Center and Museum in Greensboro, North Carolina.

== Education ==
Howard graduated from Rocky Mount High School in Rocky Mount, North Carolina. She received a B.S. degree in architecture from the University of Virginia.

== Career ==
Howard is a Principal and Managing Director at Perkins+Will in Durham, North Carolina. She has served as Senior Project Manager for the design of the National Museum of African American History and Culture, the International Civil Rights Center and Museum in Greensboro, North Carolina, and the Motown Museum expansion in Detroit, Michigan.

Howard is a founding member of her firm's Global Diversity and Inclusion Committee and is involved in projects and initiatives that aim to increase the number of women and minority architects.

== Notable projects ==
- National Museum of African American History and Culture, Washington, DC
- International Civil Rights Center and Museum, Greensboro, North Carolina
- Motown Museum Expansion, Detroit, Michigan
- Anacostia Library, Washington, DC
- Tenley-Friendship Neighborhood Library, Washington, DC
- Hogan's Alley Initiative, Vancouver, British Columbia
- Greenville Town Common, Sycamore Hill Gateway Plaza, Greenville, North Carolina
- Destination Crenshaw, Los Angeles, California

Raleigh, NC freedom park
