= Leimert Park station =

Light rail station in Los Angeles, California

Leimert Park
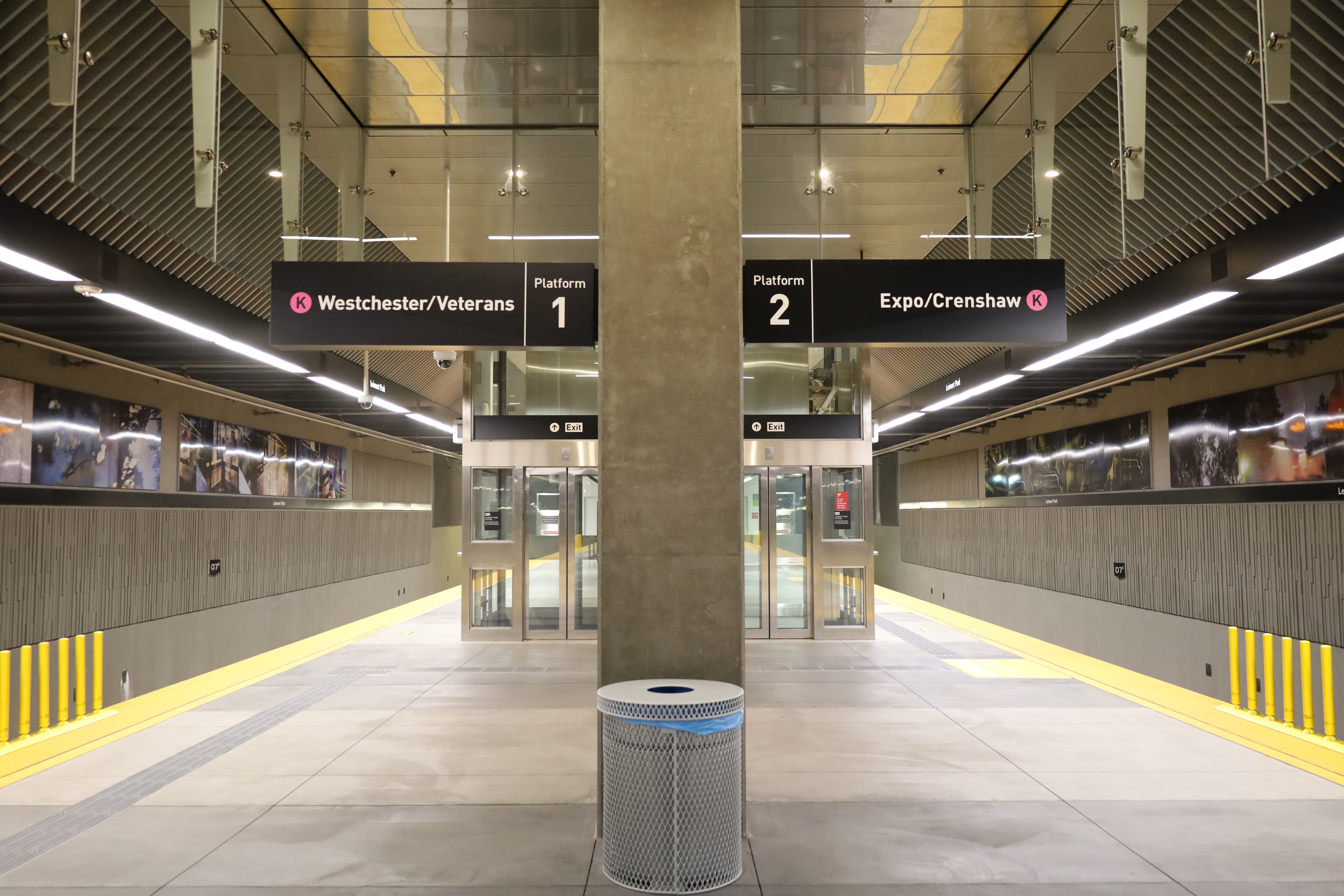
- Leimert Park station platform in 2022

General information
- Location: 4330 South Crenshaw Boulevard; Los Angeles, California
- Coordinates: 34.003951°N 118.332171°W
- Owner: Los Angeles County Metropolitan Transportation Authority
- Platforms: 1 island platform
- Tracks: 2
- Connections: Los Angeles Metro Bus; LADOT DASH

Construction
- Structure type: Underground
- Accessible: Yes

History
- Opened: October 7, 2022

Passengers
- FY 2026: 323 (avg. wkdy boardings)

Services
Preceding station	Metro Rail	Following station
Martin Luther King Jr. toward Expo/Crenshaw	K Line	Hyde Park toward Redondo Beach
Location

Leimert Park station is an underground light rail station on the K Line of the Los Angeles Metro Rail system. It is located underneath Crenshaw Boulevard at its intersection with Vernon Avenue in the Leimert Park neighborhood of Los Angeles.

The Leimert Park station was funded and fully incorporated into the project in May 2013 after massive community support for a tunnel under Park Mesa Heights.

During planning, the station was known as "Crenshaw/Vernon", with Metro adopting the current name in July 2015 in response to local feedback.

The station opened on October 7, 2022. Metro held a ceremonial ribbon cutting ceremony for the station on June 25, 2022.

The station incorporates artwork by three artists: Ingrid Calame, Mickalene Thomas, and Deanna Erdmann.

== Service ==
=== Hours and frequency ===
K Line service hours are approximately from 4:30 a.m. until 12:00 a.m. daily. Trains operate every 10 minutes throughout most of the day. Trains run every 20 minutes after 8:00 p.m. every day and before 8:00 a.m. on weekends.

=== Connections ===
As of June 6, 2025, the following connections are available:

- Los Angeles Metro Bus: 40, 102, 105, 210
- LADOT DASH: Leimert/Slauson

== Notable places nearby ==
The station is within walking distance of the following notable places:

- Leimert Plaza Park
- Vision Theatre
