= Museum of Death =

Two museums in Hollywood and New Orleans

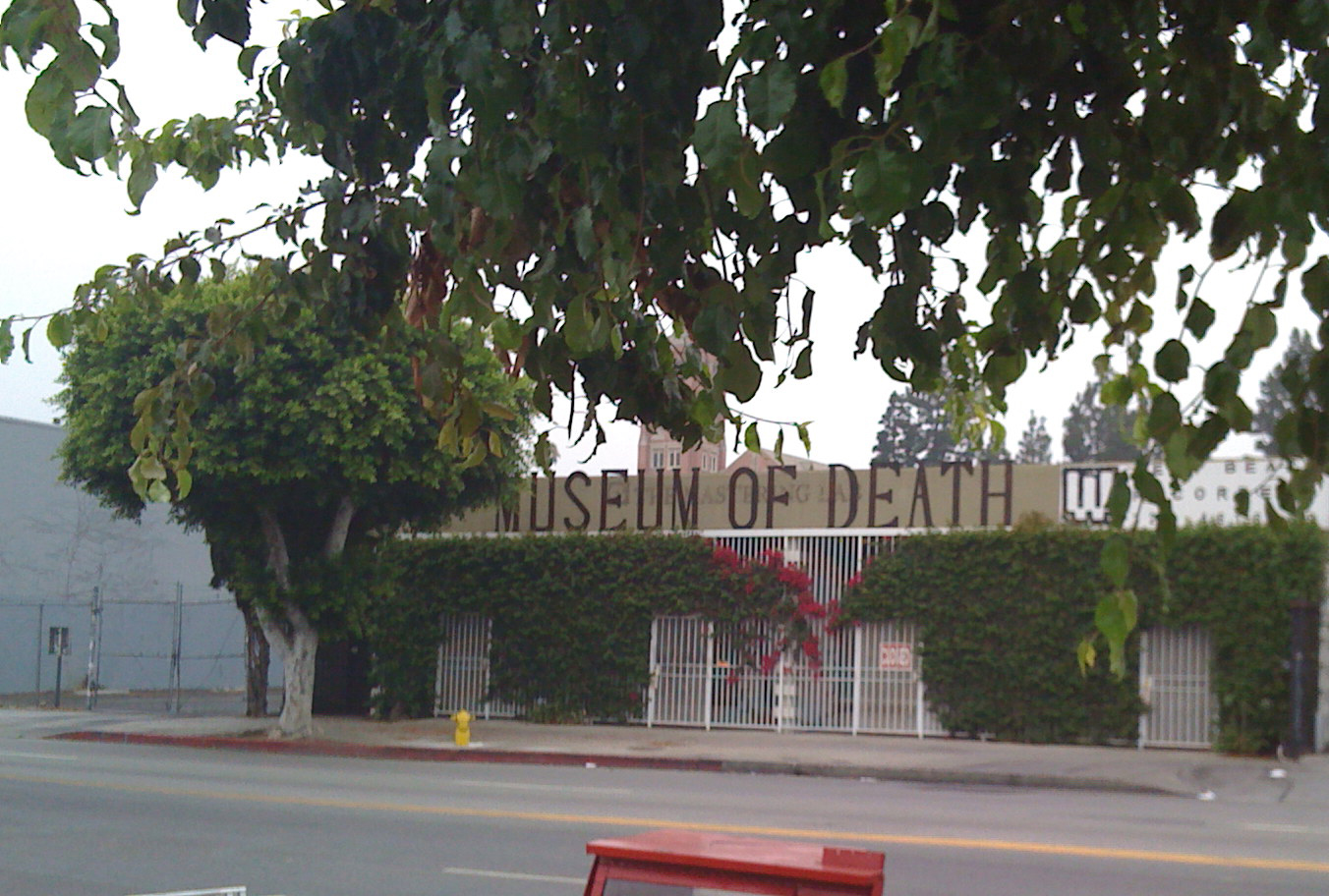
- Hollywood Branch of Museum of Death
- Established: 1995
- Location: 6031 Hollywood Boulevard; Hollywood, Los Angeles, California
- Coordinates: 34.1018°N 118.3212°W
- Founders: J. D. Healy (a.k.a. James Dean Healy); Catherine Shultz
- Website: museumofdeath.bigcartel.com

Museum of Death is a museum with locations on Selma Ave in Hollywood, Los Angeles, and New Orleans. It was established in June 1995 by J. D. Healy and Catherine Shultz with the museum's stated goal being "to make people happy to be alive."

Originally founded in San Diego, the museum began as a hobby of Healy and Shultz in a building claimed to be the city's first mortuary. They would write to serial killers they were interested in, and then show off the artwork their pen pals had created once a year at a specialist show. In 1995, after a few years of exhibitions, the collection, and many other materials, were made into a museum.

In mid 1999, the couple attempted to acquire a large amount of materials from the Heaven's Gate cult suicides. Although they had been able to purchase many items prior to the main police auction, their interest in buying enough merchandise to recreate the scene in its entirety, led to enormous press interest and publicity. They were subsequently evicted by their landlord, and moved to Hollywood Boulevard in Los Angeles.

Prior to the new Los Angeles building becoming a museum, the building was the home of Westbeach Recorders, and prior to that, Producers Studio, where Pink Floyd and others recorded. The walls include deadening agents to help with recordings, which now serve to lend a quiet acoustic setting for the various exhibitions.

== New Orleans branch ==
Musée de Mort Orleans
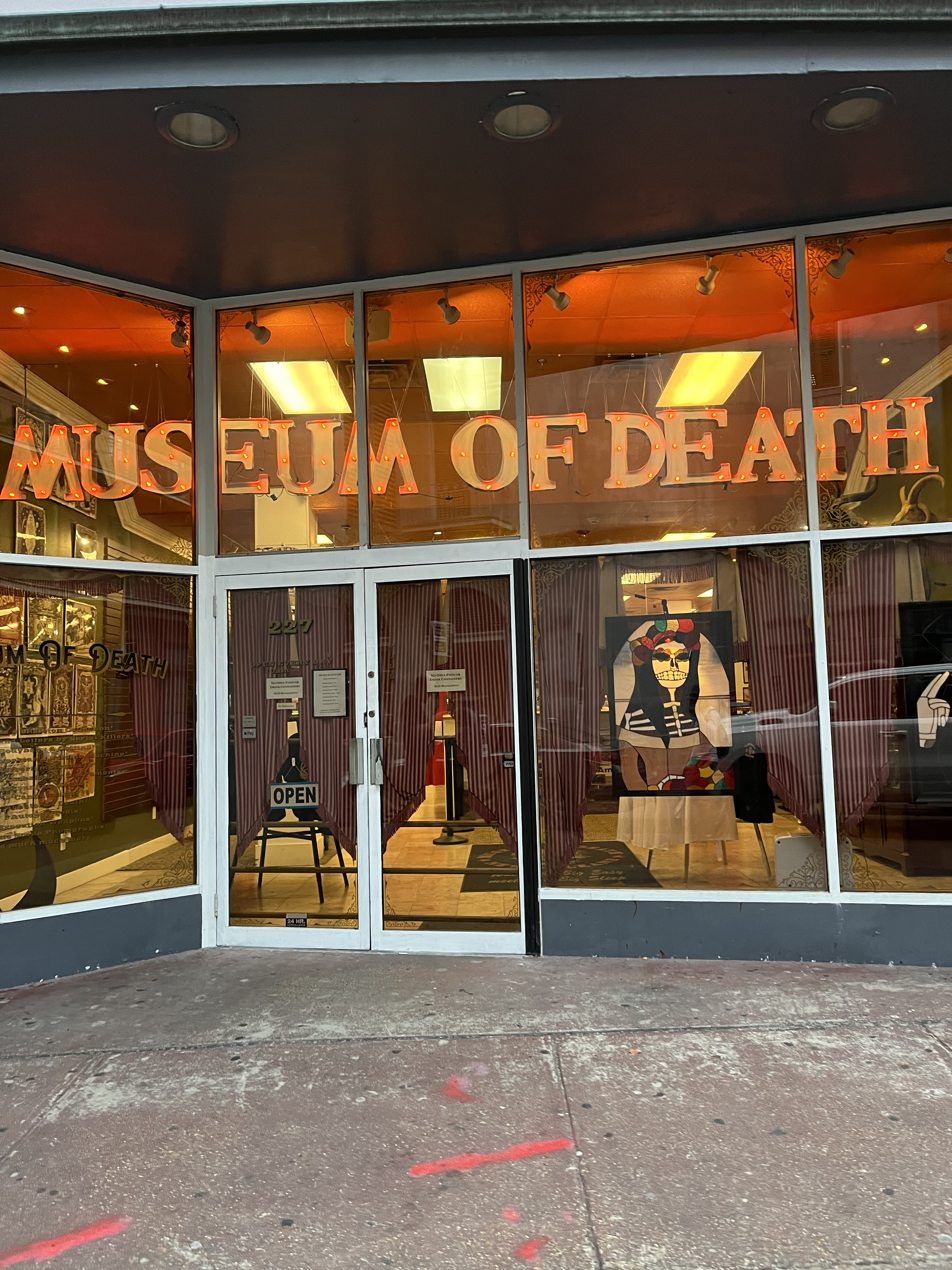
- Established: 2014
- Location: 227 Dauphine St. New Orleans, Louisiana
- Coordinates: 29.9560°N 90.0698°W

In 2014, the couple expanded to a new location of the museum in the French Quarter of New Orleans called "Musée de Mort Orleans." With approximately 12,000 square meters of space, the new museum branch allows for a greater display of the collection, while limited space in the California location restricts exhibitions to just a third of the available items at a time.

== Collection ==
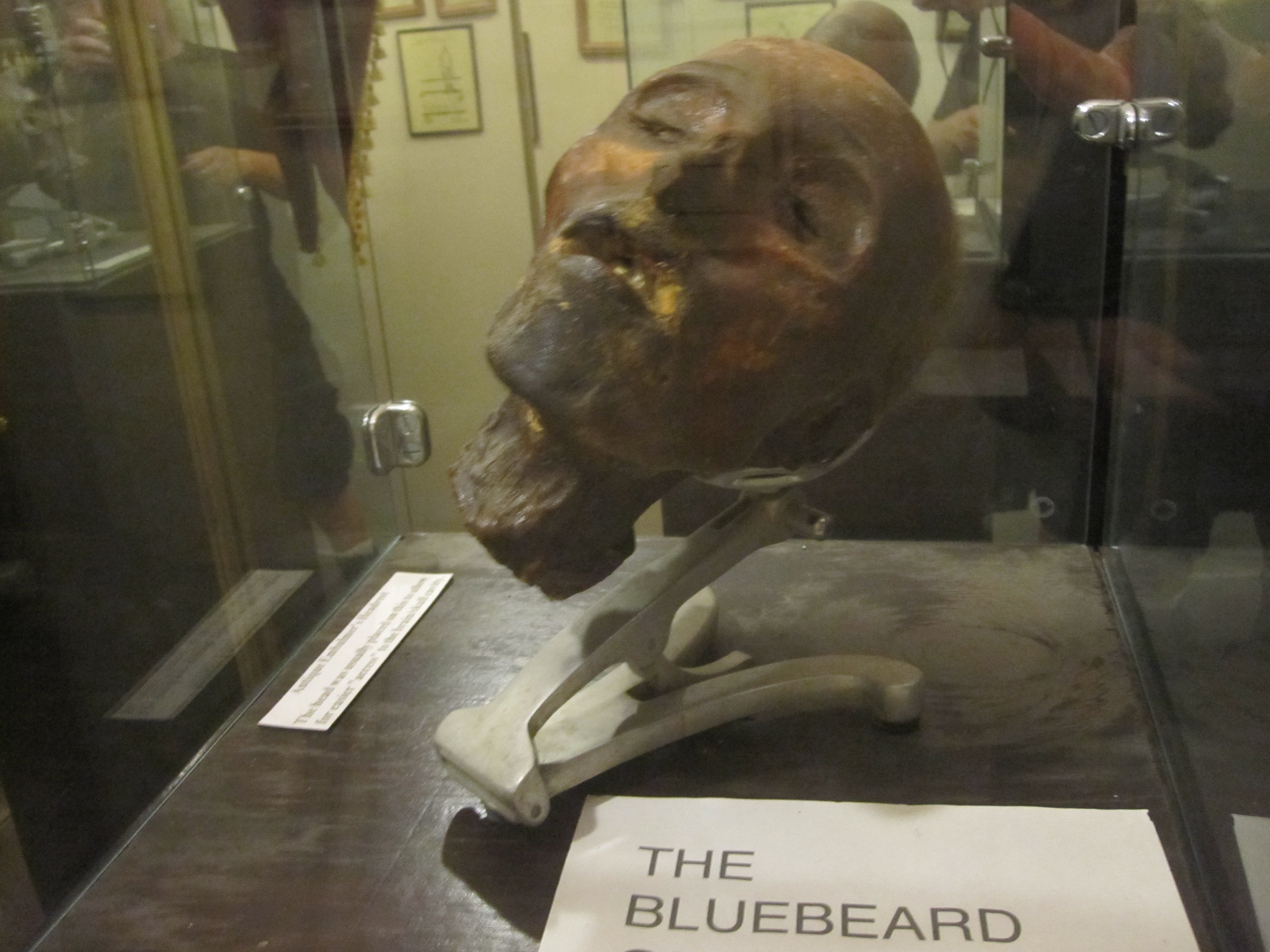
Severed head presented as Henri Landru's.

The museum displays a wide variety of art and artifacts surrounding the subject of death. Baby coffins are in one section, letters and artwork from various serial killers in another. There are films regarding autopsies as well as explicit photographs of crime victims. There is also a room filled exclusively with taxidermy of various types of animals. The museum's recreation of the Heaven's Gate mass suicide includes the original beds. However, the most notable item at the museum is the head of Henri Landru. In 2014 the museum also acquired Thanatron, one of the original suicide machines built by Jack Kevorkian.

Once a year, the museum holds a Black Dahlia look-alike competition, where contestants have to dress as both pre- and post-mortem Dahlia.

A 2001 attempt to procure a real electric chair was unsuccessful.
