= Slauson Avenue =

Thoroughfare in Los Angeles County, California, US

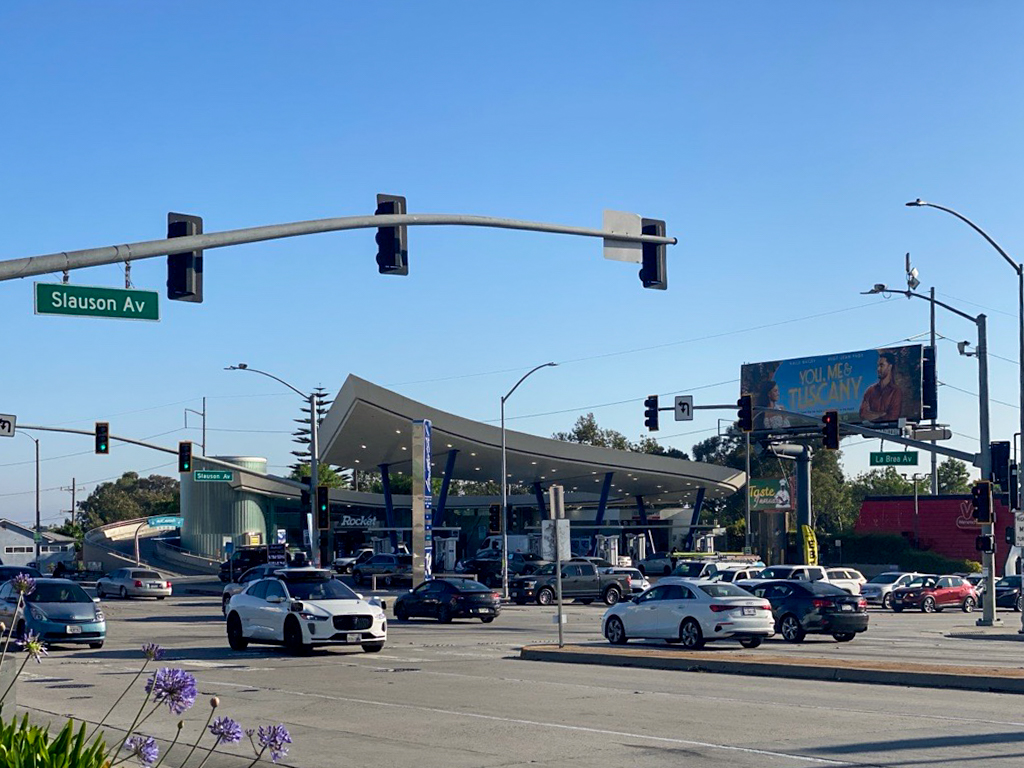
- Slauson Avenue at the intersection with La Brea Avenue
- Namesake: J. S. Slauson
- Maintained by: Local jurisdictions
- Nearest metro station: : Hyde Park; Slauson; Slauson
- West end: Culver Boulevard in Culver City
- Major junctions: SR 90 / I-405 in Culver City; I-110 in Los Angeles; I-5 in Commerce; SR 19 in Pico Rivera; I-605 in West Whittier-Los Nietos
- East end: Santa Fe Springs Road in Whittier

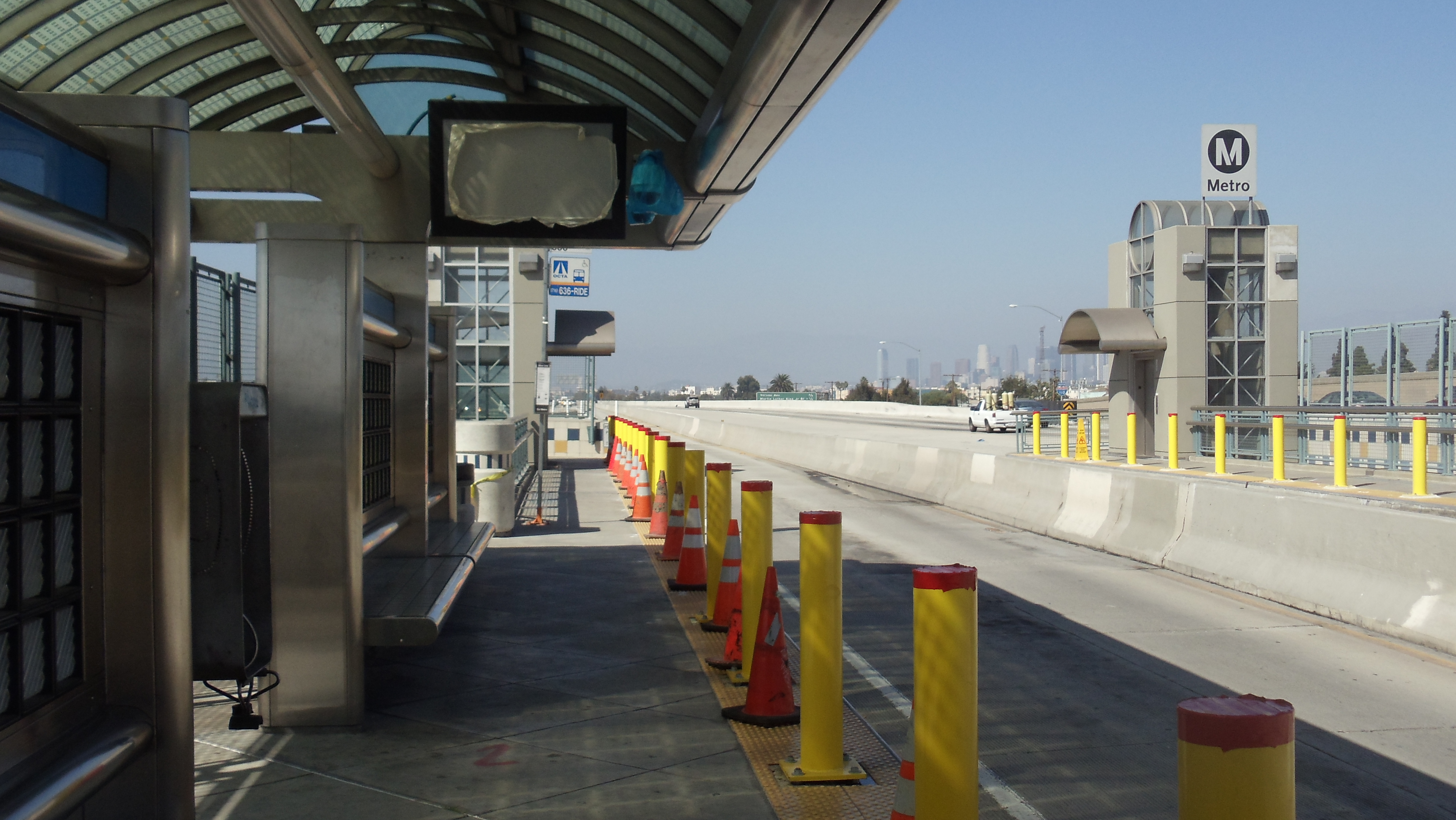
Slauson Ave & Slauson/I-110 Metro J Line Station

Slauson Avenue is a major east–west thoroughfare traversing the central part of Los Angeles County, California. It was named for the land developer and Los Angeles Board of Education member J. S. Slauson. It passes through Culver City, Ladera Heights, View Park-Windsor Hills, South Los Angeles, Huntington Park, Maywood, Commerce, Montebello, Pico Rivera, Whittier, and Santa Fe Springs. The street runs 20.9 miles (33.6 km) from McDonald Street in Culver City and to Santa Fe Springs Road, where it becomes Mulberry Drive in Whittier. Mulberry Drive ends at Scott Avenue in South Whittier.

== Transit ==
=== Metro Rail ===
There are three major transit stations (two light rail) on Slauson Avenue. They include the Slauson Station of the Metro A Line and the Hyde Park Station on the Metro K Line.

=== Metro Bus and freeways ===
Slauson/I-110 Station of the Metro J Line is elevated in the median of Interstate 110 freeway.

Metro Local line 108 operates on Slauson Avenue.

The eastern terminus of the State Route 90, the Marina Freeway, is at Slauson Avenue. In Los Angeles, the street is south of Washington Boulevard and Vernon Avenue, but north of Gage Avenue and Florence Avenue.

=== 2022 Crash ===
On August 4th, 2022, a traveling nurse from Houston, Nicole Linton, deliberately sped up to 130mph hour, and slammed her car into traffic, killing six people including an unborn baby, and injured eight others. She was later found guilty of six counts of second-degree murder. It is one of the worst vehicle crashes in recent Los Angeles history. A permanent memorial was made at the intersection honoring the victims.

== Landmarks ==
Slauson Avenue was noted for a former Bethlehem Steel mill on the 3300 block. At one time Slauson Avenue was a center for urban heavy industry in Los Angeles; the ATSF Harbor Subdivision once ran along Slauson Avenue. It is also known for the Simply Wholesome Vegetarian restaurant and Health food store, the Wateridge office park and the historic Jet Inn motor hotel.

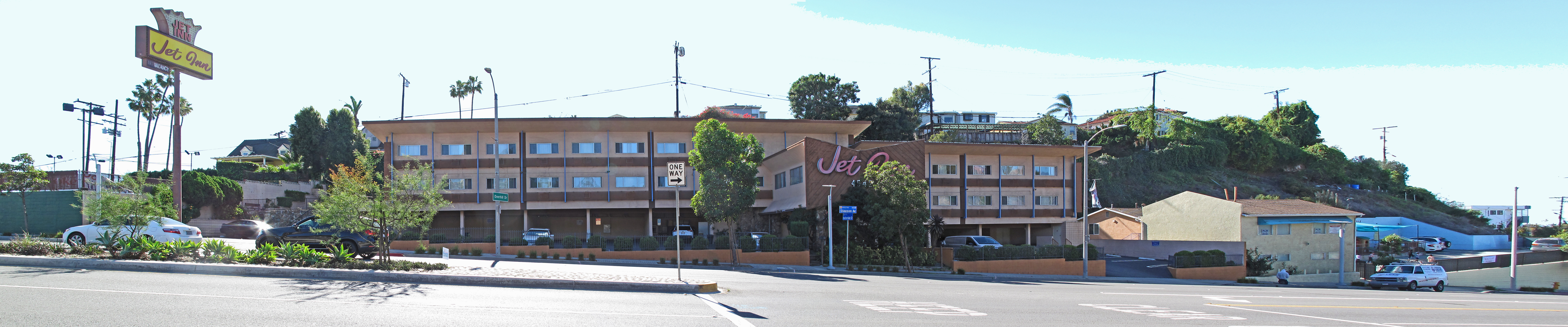
Jet Inn at 4542 Slauson Avenue

=== Revitalization project ===
Portions of Slauson Avenue have been revitalized with a new tree-lined barrier, new LED street and traffic lights, and Metro Local bus benches. The project was officially completed in May 2017.

== In popular culture ==
Rapper and Los Angeles native Nipsey Hussle frequently referred to Slauson Avenue in his music. He owned the Marathon Clothing Store at the intersection of Slauson and Crenshaw. The intersection was named Ermias "Nipsey Hussle" Asghedom Square in April 2019 in his honor.

On The Johnny Carson Show, Carson played a character named Art Fern who would advertise dubious businesses, giving the audience convoluted driving directions that often ended in "Go to the Slauson Cutoff, stop the car, then cut off your Slauson".

== See also ==
- Baldwin Hills Mountains
- Lester R. Rice-Wray—Los Angeles City Council member recalled from office because of his stand on a mid-20th-century Slauson storm-drain proposal
