= Hyde Park, Los Angeles =

Hyde Park
- Neighborhood of Los Angeles
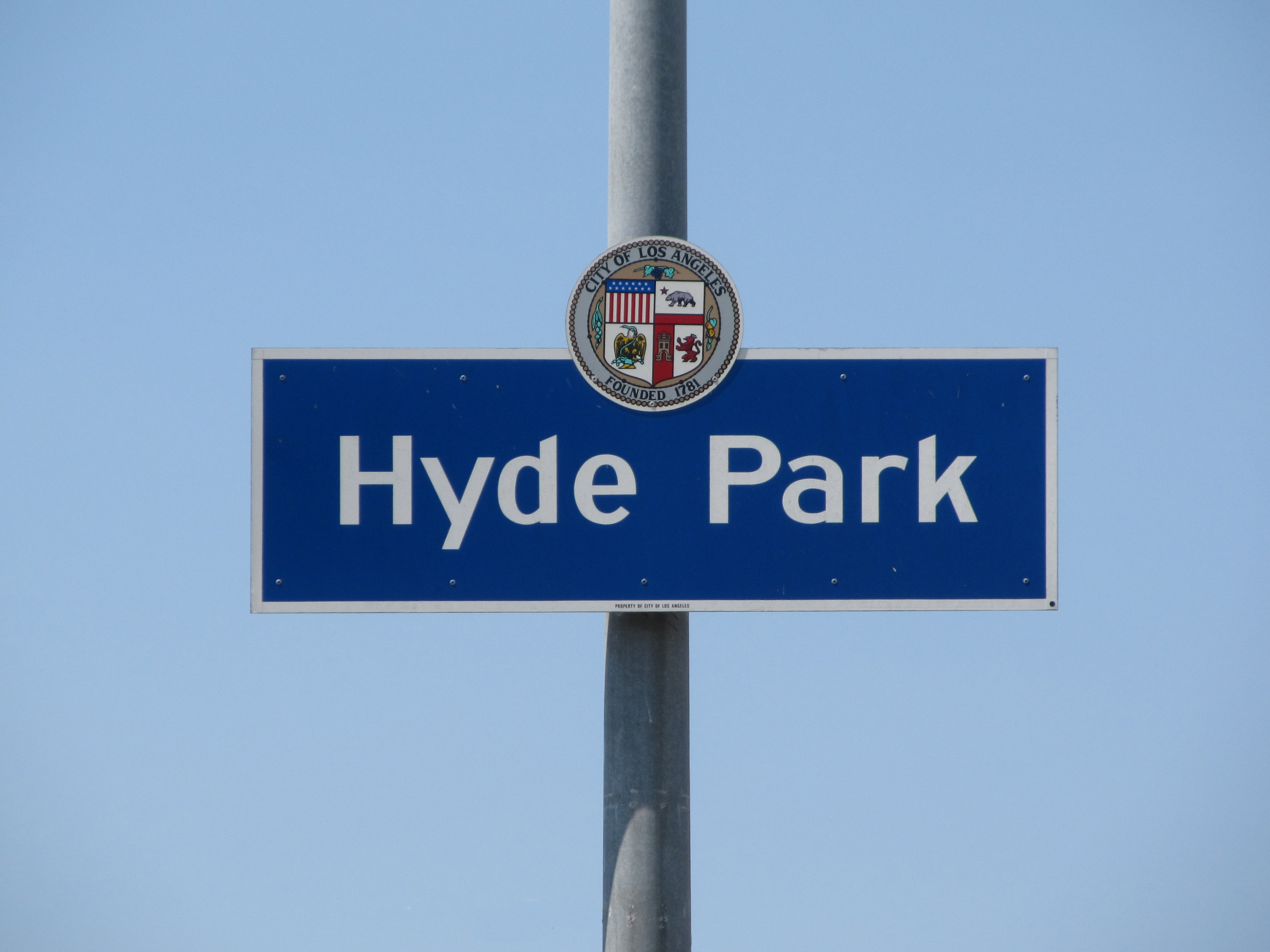
- "Hyde Park" city signage located at Crenshaw Boulevard & 79th Street.

- Location within Central Los Angeles
- Coordinates: 33°58′50″N 118°19′51″W
- Country: United States
- State: California
- County: Los Angeles
- City: Los Angeles
- Time zone: Pacific
- Zip Code: 90043
- Area code: 323

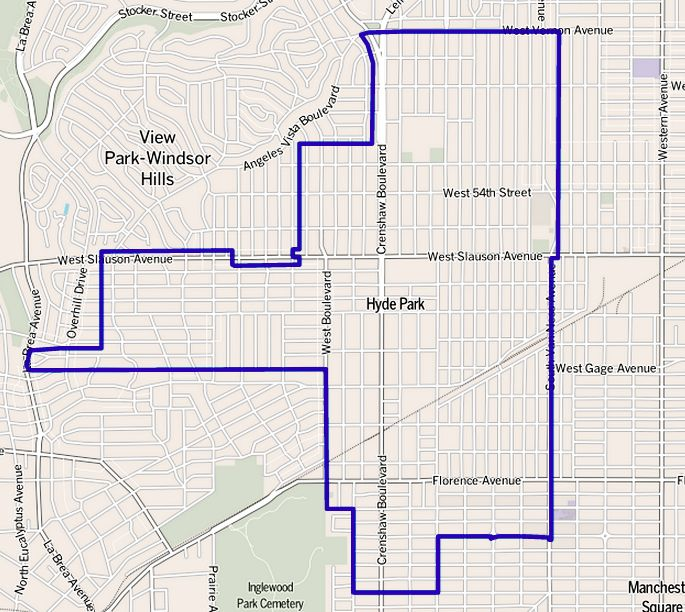
The Hyde Park neighborhood of the city of Los Angeles, as mapped by the Los Angeles Times

Hyde Park is a neighborhood in the South region of Los Angeles, California. Formerly a separate city, it was consolidated with Los Angeles in 1923.

The commercial corridor along Crenshaw Boulevard is known as "the heart of African American commerce in Los Angeles". Destination Crenshaw is an open-air museum along Crenshaw Boulevard that celebrates African American history and culture.

== History ==
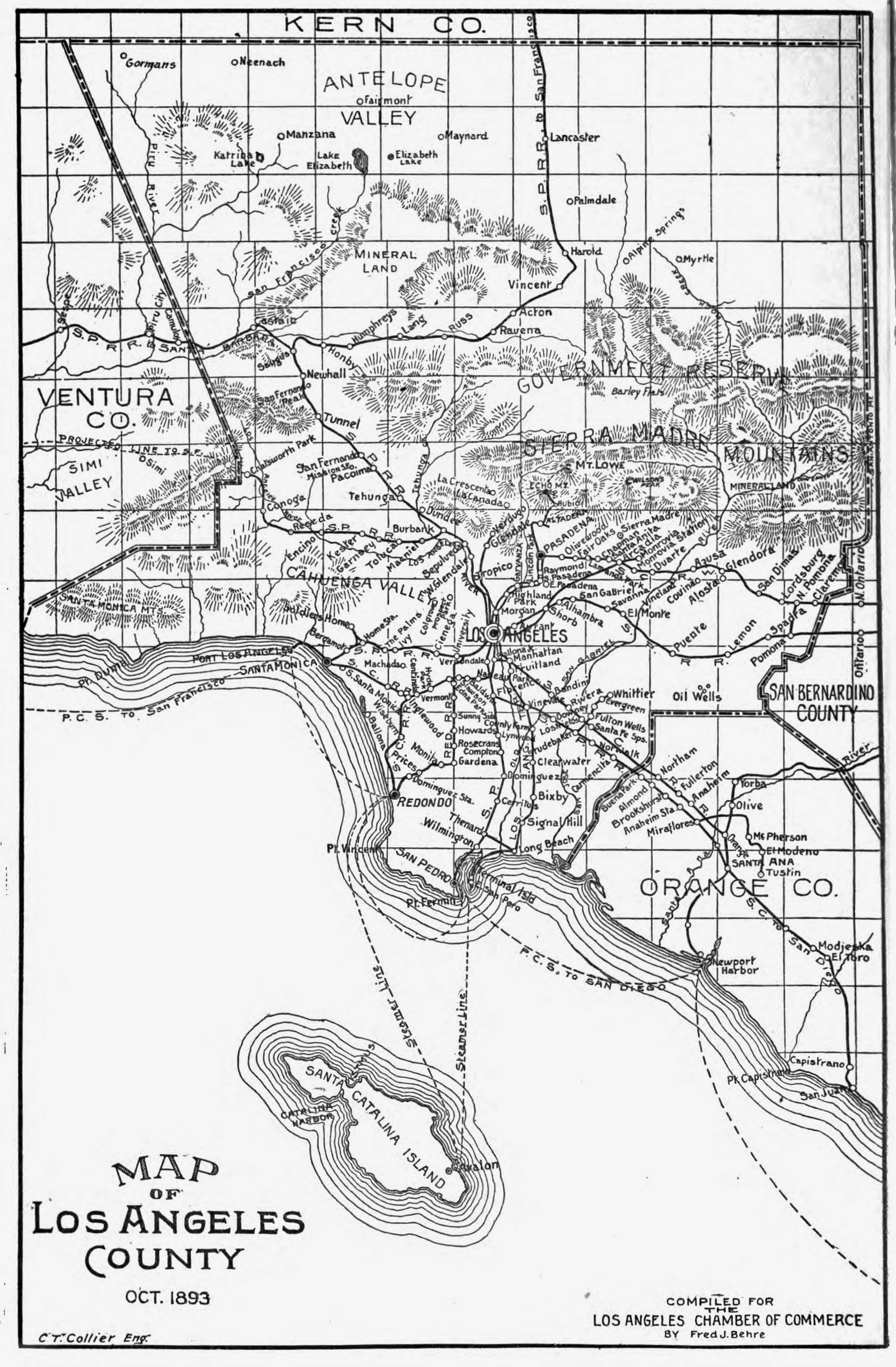
Hyde Park on a map of Los Angeles County published October 1893 for the World's Columbian Exposition

North is at the top of this map from the Los Angeles Times, August 20, 1916. A Santa Fe Railroad track runs northeast-southwest through Hyde Park. Southwest from Mesa Drive (now Crenshaw Boulevard) lies a paved boulevard (now Florence Avenue) to Redondo Beach. Manchester Avenue (now Boulevard) is at the bottom. The “Proposed Road” at the top (signaled by an arrow) and Mesa Drive are now part of Crenshaw Boulevard. The Baldwin Hills (mountain range) are at top left.

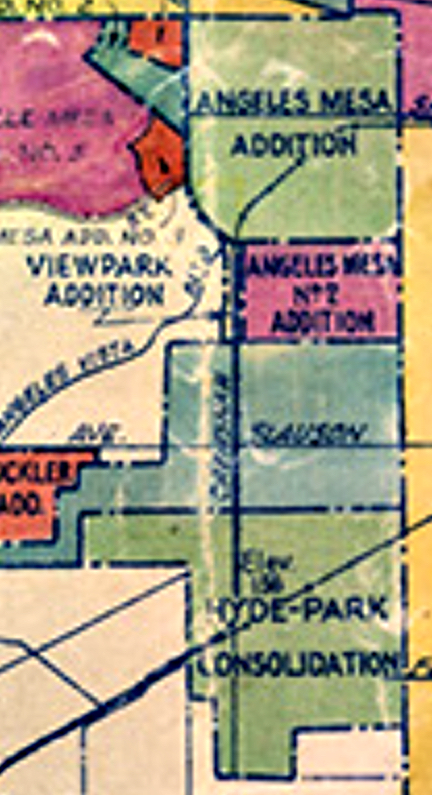
Three annexations of Angeles Mesa areas to Los Angeles are noted, at top, as is the small annexation of the View Park residential tract. The city of Hyde Park, which was consolidated with Los Angeles, is at the bottom of the map.

Hyde Park is one of the oldest neighborhoods in the city of Los Angeles. It was "laid out as a town" in 1887 as a stop on the Atchison, Topeka and Santa Fe Railway's Harbor Subdivision, which ran from Downtown Los Angeles to the port at Wilmington in a westward loop.

It was incorporated as a city in 1922 and had its own government. However, on May 17, 1923, its 1.2 square miles (3.1 km^{2}) was consolidated with the larger city of Los Angeles after a favorable vote by Hyde Park residents. The city of Hyde Park was bordered by 60th Street on the north, Van Ness (now 8th Avenue) on the east, Florence Avenue on the south, and West Boulevard on the west.

== Geography ==
Hyde Park's street and other boundaries are: West Vernon Avenue on the north, South Arlington/Van Ness Avenues on the east and the Los Angeles city boundary on the south and west.

According to the Mapping L.A. project of the Los Angeles Times, Hyde Park touches Leimert Park on the north, Vermont Square on the northeast, Chesterfield Square on the east, Manchester Square on the southeast; Inglewood on the south and southwest, and View Park-Windsor Hills on the west and northwest.

== Demographics ==
=== 2000 ===
A total of 36,635 people lived in the 2.88 square miles (7.5 km^{2}) neighborhood, according to the 2000 U.S. census—averaging 12,700 inhabitants per square mile (4,900/km^{2}), about the same as the population density in the city as a whole. The median age was 31, also about the same as the rest of the city.

In 2000, there were 2,474 families headed by single parents, or 28.5%, a rate that was high for the county and the city. There were 2,237 veterans, or 8% of the population, considered high when compared with the city overall.

Hyde Park residents aged 25 and older holding a four-year degree amounted to 12.2% of the population in 2000, considered low when compared with the city and the county as a whole, but the percentages of residents aged 25 and older with a high school diploma and college bachelor's degree was considered high for the county.

Mexican was the most common ancestry. Mexico and El Salvador were the most common foreign places of birth.

=== 2008 ===
The median household income in 2008 dollars was $39,460, considered average for both the city and county. The percentage of households earning $20,000 or less was high, compared to the county at large. The average household size of 2.8 people was also average. Renters occupied 53.3% of the housing units, and homeowners occupied the rest.

=== 2016 ===
According to the 2016 United States Census Bureau American Community Survey the demographics of the Hyde Park neighborhood was 56.80% African American, and 48.6% were Hispanic of any race.

== Parks and recreation ==
- Van Ness Recreation Center - 5720 2nd Avenue. It has 2 indoor gymnasiums, barbecue pits, outdoor basketball courts and 3 baseball diamonds .

== Library ==
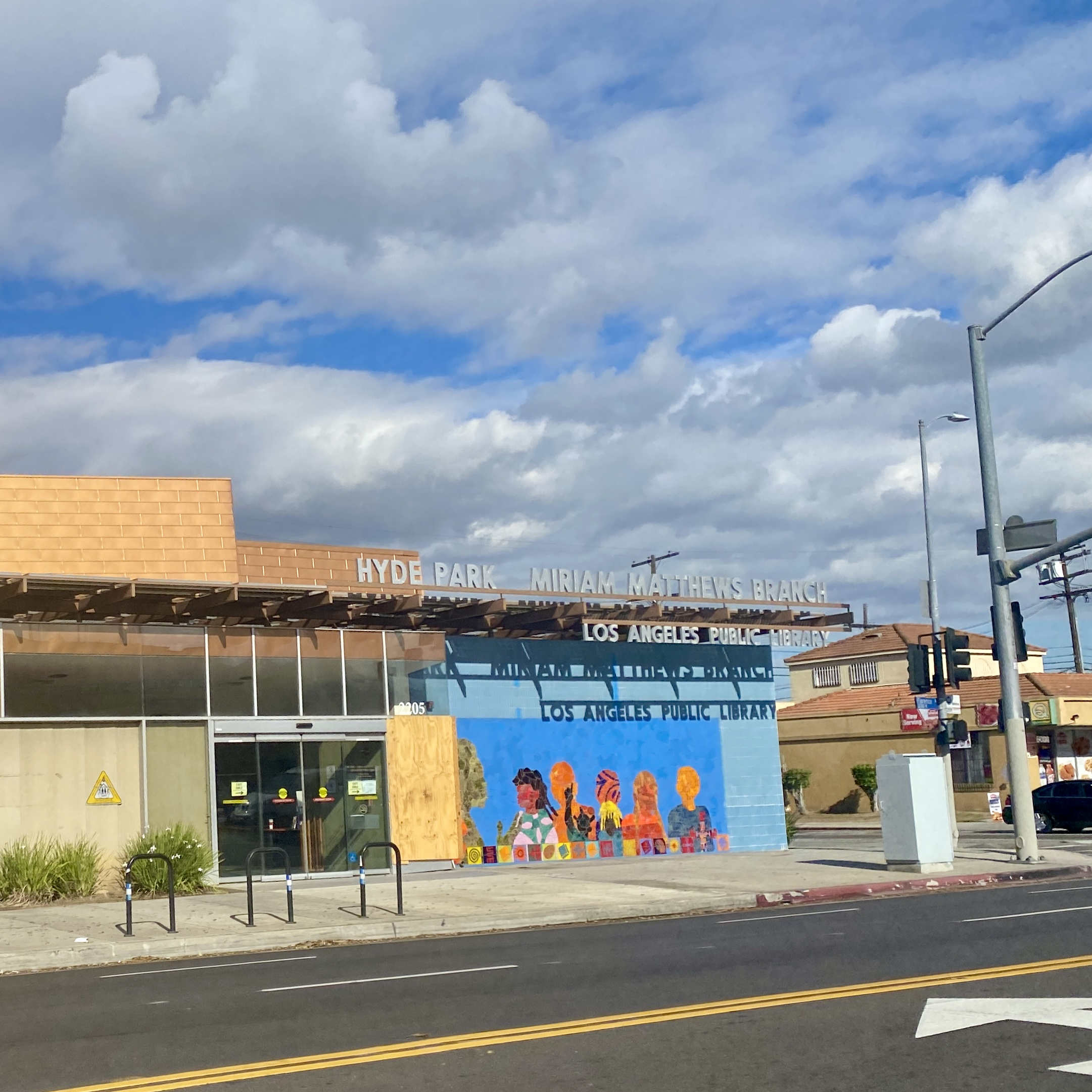
Hyde Park branch (2023)

- Hyde Park Miriam Matthews branch of the Los Angeles Public Library - 2205 W. Florence Avenue

== Attractions ==
- Destination Crenshaw - Crenshaw Boulevard between 48th and 60th streets

== Education ==
Public schools within the Hyde Park boundaries are:

- Crenshaw Senior High School, LAUSD, 5010 11th Ave
- Alliance William and Carol Ouchi Academy High, LAUSD charter, 5356 South Fifth Avenue
- View Park Preparatory Accelerated High, LAUSD charter, 5701 South Crenshaw Boulevard
- Crenshaw Arts-Technology Charter High, LAUSD, 4120 11th Avenue
- Whitney Young Continuation, LAUSD, 3051 West 52nd Street
- KIPP Academy of Opportunity, LAUSD charter middle, 7019 South Van Ness Avenue
- Today's Fresh Start Charter, LAUSD, 4514 Crenshaw Boulevard
- Angeles Mesa Elementary, LAUSD, 2611 West 52nd Street
- View Park Preparatory Accelerated Charter Middle, LAUSD, 5749 South Crenshaw Boulevard
- Fifty-Ninth Street Elementary, LAUSD, 5939 Second Avenue
- YES Academy, LAUSD elementary, 3140 Hyde Park Boulevard
- Alliance Renee and Meyer Luskin Academy High School, 2941 70th Street

== Notable people ==
- Nipsey Hussle
- Teresa Graves
