= The Shifting Grounds of Race =

The Shifting Grounds of Race: Black and Japanese Americans in the Making of Multiethnic Los Angeles
- Cover of the first edition
- Author: Scott Kurashige
- Language: English
- Published: 2008
- Publication place: United States
- Media type: Print

The Shifting Grounds of Race: Black and Japanese Americans in the Making of Multiethnic Los Angeles is a nonfiction book by Scott Kurashige, published in 2008 by Princeton University Press. It discusses interactions between African Americans and Japanese Americans in the Los Angeles area from the 1920s through the 1990s. Kurashige argued that the distinct civil rights' movements of both the African-Americans and the Japanese Americans in Los Angeles were affected by the "shifting grounds of race"; aspects of their movements overlapped but they used distinct methods and strategies. On many occasions members of the two ethnic groups lived in proximity to one another. Japanese people focused on business as they were unable to participate in politics, since they were not U.S. citizens. African-Americans, who were U.S. citizens, were able to participate in politics while having less footing in the business world. The focus on black-Japanese relations is distinct from the usual tendency of race-related nonfiction works to focus on white-black relations. Kurashige emphasized the presence of "triangular relations" among blacks, Japanese, and the politically dominant white political center.

David O. Sears of the University of California, Los Angeles wrote that the book is a part of a "second wave" of scholarship discussing 20th century race and ethnicity-related effects on cities in the northern-influenced United States.

== Background ==
The author, an associate professor teaching urban U.S. history and Asian American history at the University of Michigan, aimed this book at an academic audience. He used government records, manuscripts, and area newspapers in his research. Much of the research he used originated from Japanese-American scholars. The author consulted five libraries, with a total of 19 collections used. Jeremiah B. C. Axelrod of Occidental College stated that stories of ground-level interactions between ethnic groups "only rarely show up" in sources consulted by the author.

As part of his research Kurashige consulted Politics in Black and White (1994) by Raphael Sonenshein, My Blue Heaven (2002) by Becky Nicholaides, Suburban Warriors (2002) by Lisa McGirr, Bound for Freedom (2006) by Douglas Flamming, and L.A. City Limits (2006) by Josh Sides. Kurashige consulted Occupied America: A History of Chicanos by Rodolfo Acuña for much of his information on Latinos.

== Contents ==
The book's primary focus is on the conflict and cooperation among blacks and Japanese, while it also explores the Japanese community of Los Angeles and black history in Los Angeles.

The book chapters are arranged chronologically. However, events discussed within a chapter may not be arranged chronologically.

The book's coverage begins with the 1920s. White persons in Los Angeles became less racially tolerant in the post-World War I era, and the book discusses how blacks and Japanese began to work together. During that time both blacks and Japanese shared space in close proximity as they were kept out of white neighborhoods through housing covenants. The whites were trying to exclude minorities from the Los Angeles Westside, while the blacks and Japanese both fought to gain access to employment and housing. Moon-Ho Jung of University of Washington wrote that according to the book these efforts were "common, if largely separate, efforts".

The portions discussing the beginning of the divergence of black and Japanese outcomes are Chapter 4 through 7. Shifting Grounds discusses the Japanese internment period; African-Americans argued that they needed to be included in the economy and that it would be unpatriotic to deny them. In the book Kurashige discusses how many Japanese Americans in the post-Japanese internment period wished to make themselves model American citizens while many African-Americans wished to challenge the legitimacy of the government; Yuichiro Onishi of the University of Minnesota Twin Cities stated that this was a "notable" aspect. According to Kevin Allen Leonard of Western Washington University, the "most path-breaking and cohesive chapters" were the portions discussing the World War II and post-war eras. Shana Bernstein of Southwestern University wrote that the chapter discussing the nikkei during World War II was among the most interesting in the book.

Kurashige discusses how the black and Japanese rights' movements diverged in the later portion of the 20th century in the final portions of his book. The remaining four chapters discuss the more favorable treatment given to Japanese persons and less favorable treatment given to blacks. Kurashige stated that Cold War politics and a shift of racial politics resulted in Japanese-Americans being labeled as a "model minority" and that this was used to downplay African-Americans. Japan became an ally of the U.S. in the Cold War, leading to increasing acceptance of Japanese Americans. Ultimately the two ethnic groups had different rates of assimilation and integration into Los Angeles. Jason Narlock of the Department of American Studies, King's College London wrote that this is "arguably [Kurashige's] strongest analysis". The Watts riots and the increasing role of Latinos and Hispanics in the civil rights movement are discussed. Bernstein wrote "Kurashige's concluding section traces how the postwar groups, in effect, exchanged places. Japanese Americans' fortunes improved while blacks' conditions deteriorated."

The 1970s is the ending point of the book, where it analyzes the black Mayor of Los Angeles Tom Bradley's efforts to establish Los Angeles the "gateway to the Pacific Rim".

Alisa Kramer, an independent reviewer of the History: Reviews of New Books stated that the book "relies heavily on the ideological language of race and class". Edward J.W. Park of Loyola Marymount University wrote that the author's knowledge of and discussions about how neighborhoods changed and developed was his "central and singular strength". Sarah Schrank of California State University, Long Beach wrote that the interrogative avenue "that most haunts the book is how the actual and metaphoric intersection of these two social groups at Little Tokyo/Bronzeville produced entirely different political narratives after World War II."

== Reception ==
The book won the 2008 Albert J. Beveridge Book Award of the American Historical Association and the 2008 Book Award in History of the Association for Asian American Studies.

=== Book reviews ===
Axelrod stated "we are fortunate that Kurashige has given us an insightful and wide-ranging investigation into how leaders of two subaltern communities navigated the dangerous waters of race in a twentieth-century American city."

Randal Beeman of Bakersfield College wrote that the book was an "exemplary student" and that it "is charged with the kind of details that suggests Kurashige knows his subject intimately". Beeman argues that the book could have added more information about "whiteness" in Los Angeles terms, discussed the relations between Mexicans and the blacks and Japanese. Beeman added that the book "occasionally lapses into academic theory and terminology that detracts from the otherwise fascinating story."

Bernstein wrote that the book overall is "a thoroughly researched study". She argued that the introduction "is somewhat dense and confusing and would have benefited from further editing.." She also argued that the book should have further supported its conclusions about and re-examine the role of the Los Angeles Congress of Industrial Organizations (CIO) and the Los Angeles Jewish community, and she considered the idea of the book exploring the Latino population.

J. Borchert, emeritus at Cleveland State University stated that he recommended the book and that it was an "excellent study".

Hillary Jenks of Portland State University wrote that the book "makes significant contributions to multiple fields of scholarly enquiry", including ethnic, political, and urban studies. She added that the book neglected to discuss the sizeable Latino population and neglected to analyze neighborhoods outside of the Los Angeles city limits.

Kramer stated that the book is "a well researched analysis of multicultural Los Angeles that enriches scholarship of the city’s history." She argued that sometimes the book does not define certain terms and phrases and uses them too often, gives too much significance to Communist Party activity since the number of members was in reality too few, and "minimizes gains made by the black middle class in the postwar years."

Leonard stated that the book is "provocative and often persuasive", and that it "represents a significant addition not only to the growing bodies of historical scholarship about African Americans and Japanese Americans in Los Angeles but also to the literature about racial discourse and politics in the twentieth-century United States." Leonard stated that sometimes the author did not include explanation on why certain subjects say or write what they said, and therefore "is not always clear that [Kurashige] examined his sources critically." Leonard also wrote that Kurashige "seems to accept uncritically the arguments of a number of other historians" and "rarely pauses to explore how events in the intervening years may have influenced the recollections of these interviewees and authors." Leonard argued that the lack of chronological order in some chapters makes it difficult to follow some arguments. In addition he believed that the lack of information on interactions with the Latino community and a lack of references to more contemporary books about Latinos was detrimental to the book's goal to explore multi-ethnic Los Angeles.

Narlock wrote that it "provides an invaluable framework for reconstructing a ‘‘multiethnic historical narrative from the ground up, ’’[...]" and is "[w]ell crafted and well researched".

Onishi argues that the book omits racial experiences and therefore "tends to marginalize" the intended focus by characterizing the relationship between blacks and Japanese as Los Angeles as "interethnic" rather than being interracial; Onishi stated that this is because blacks and Japanese are parts of two distinct racial groups. Onishi also stated that the author "does not engage the social theories and histories that explain how and why the grounds of race shifted in early 20th century Los Angeles."

Park concluded that the author "has made a valuable contribution to the history of Japanese Americans by documenting the urban story of internment during World War II" in addition to their overall history of in Los Angeles.

Schrank described the book as a "remarkable work of research and analytical precision", as well as "a smart and provocative book". She added that "is not an easy one to read."

Sears wrote that the book had "impressive historical scholarship" and that he "recommend[s] [The Shifting Grounds of Race and Newark: A History of Race, Rights, and Riots in America by Kevin Mumford] as fascinating reads."

Dean S. Toji, a Japanese-American California State University, Long Beach professor from Crenshaw, stated that he "found [the book] to be consistently enlightening about familiar individuals, organizations, and events, both Japanese American and African American." Toji added that the accounts of neighborhood-by-neighborhood racial interactions are "an outstanding feature of the book".

Scott Whitaker of Arizona State University wrote that he "highly recommends" this book.

== See also ==
- History of African Americans in Los Angeles
- History of the Japanese in Los Angeles
