= History of African Americans in Los Angeles =

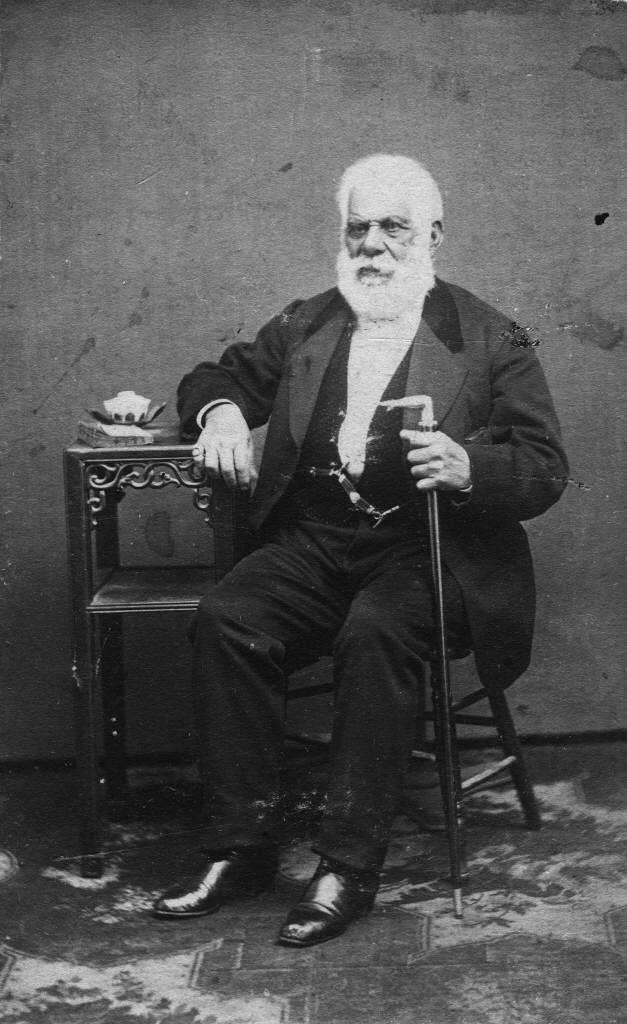
Pío Pico, California's last governor under Mexican rule, was of mixed Spanish, Native American, and African ancestry

The history of African Americans in Los Angeles includes participation in the culture, education, and politics of the city of Los Angeles, California, United States.

The first blacks in Los Angeles were mulattos and Afro-Mexicans who immigrated to California from Sinaloa and Sonora in northwestern Mexico.

Contributions to the city's culture have particularly been in music, dance, visual arts, stage, and film.

African Americans are concentrated in South Los Angeles; as well as a Black community in suburban cities such as Compton and Inglewood. There are sizable African immigrant communities in Greater Los Angeles. There is also a Louisiana Creole community in Los Angeles County. There is an Ethiopian and Eritrean community in Little Ethiopia. Some are Afro-Latino people from Central and South American countries, especially Garifuna American people. Many were born in Nigeria, Eritrea, Ethiopia, Somalia, Belize, Honduras, Panama, and Ghana.

The Black population in Los Angeles has declined since 2017, due to gentrification and more Latinos such as Mexicans and Central Americans moving to their neighborhoods. Many blacks leaving Los Angeles and also California moved to cities in the Southern United States, including Atlanta, Charlotte, Dallas, Houston, Little Rock, New Orleans, and San Antonio. Including partly Black people, Los Angeles proper is 10% Black (estimated 385,000 residents in 2021). Many African Americans have become homeless in the city. African Americans make up 34% of Los Angeles's homeless, while only being 8% of the city's population in 2020.

Blacks in Los Angeles have a lower life expectancy and die younger than other racial groups in Los Angeles.

Los Angeles also has a sizable Black immigrant population. Los Angeles has the largest Ethiopian population in the United States after Washington, D.C.. 45,000 Ethiopians live in the Los Angeles area. 6,000 Eritreans live in Los Angeles.

== History ==
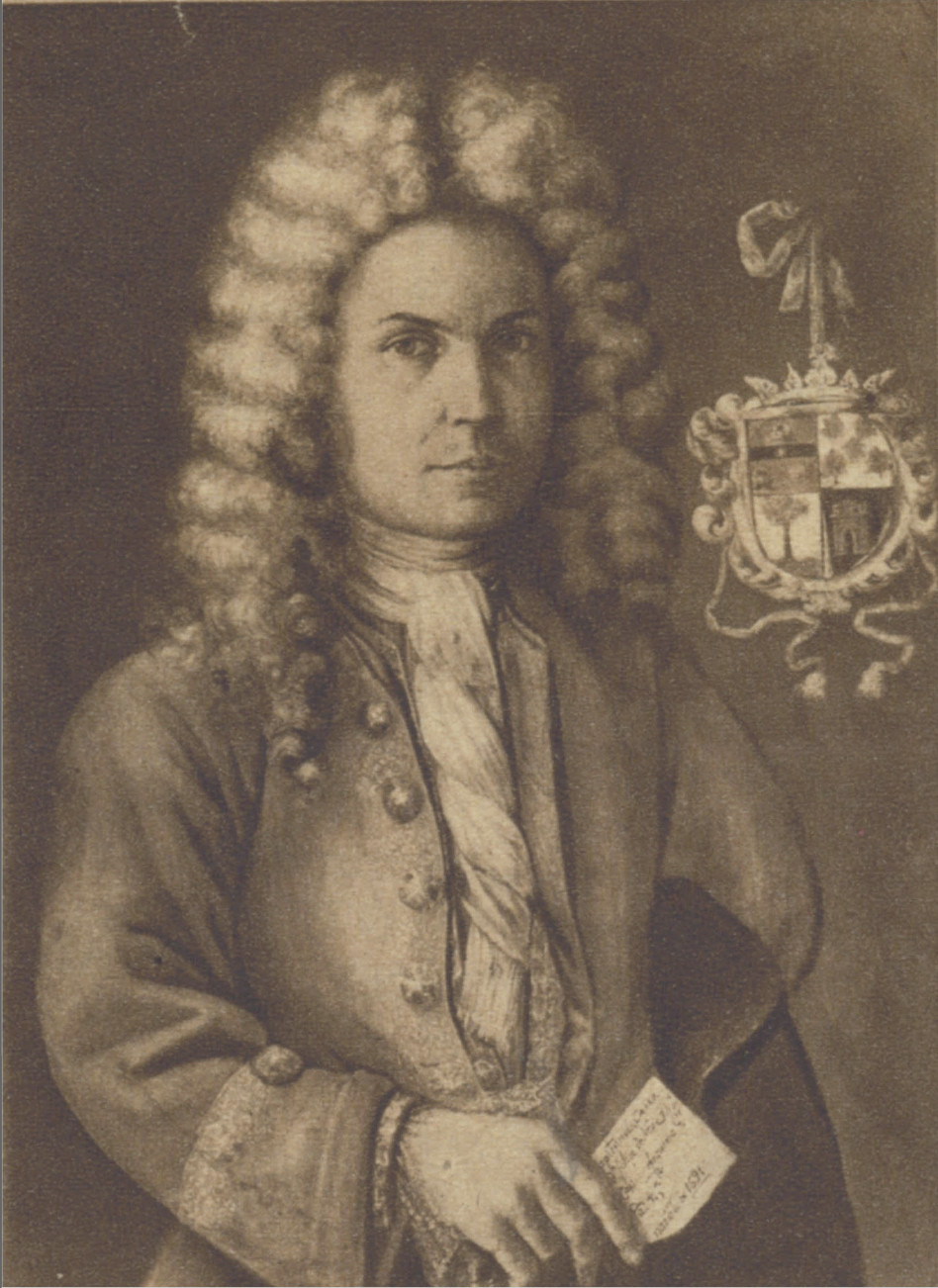
Spanish governor of the Californias Felipe de Neve brought Afro-Mexicans to help build the city in 1777.

Tongva people inhabited the area before the arrival of European colonists and African slaves.

=== 18th century ===
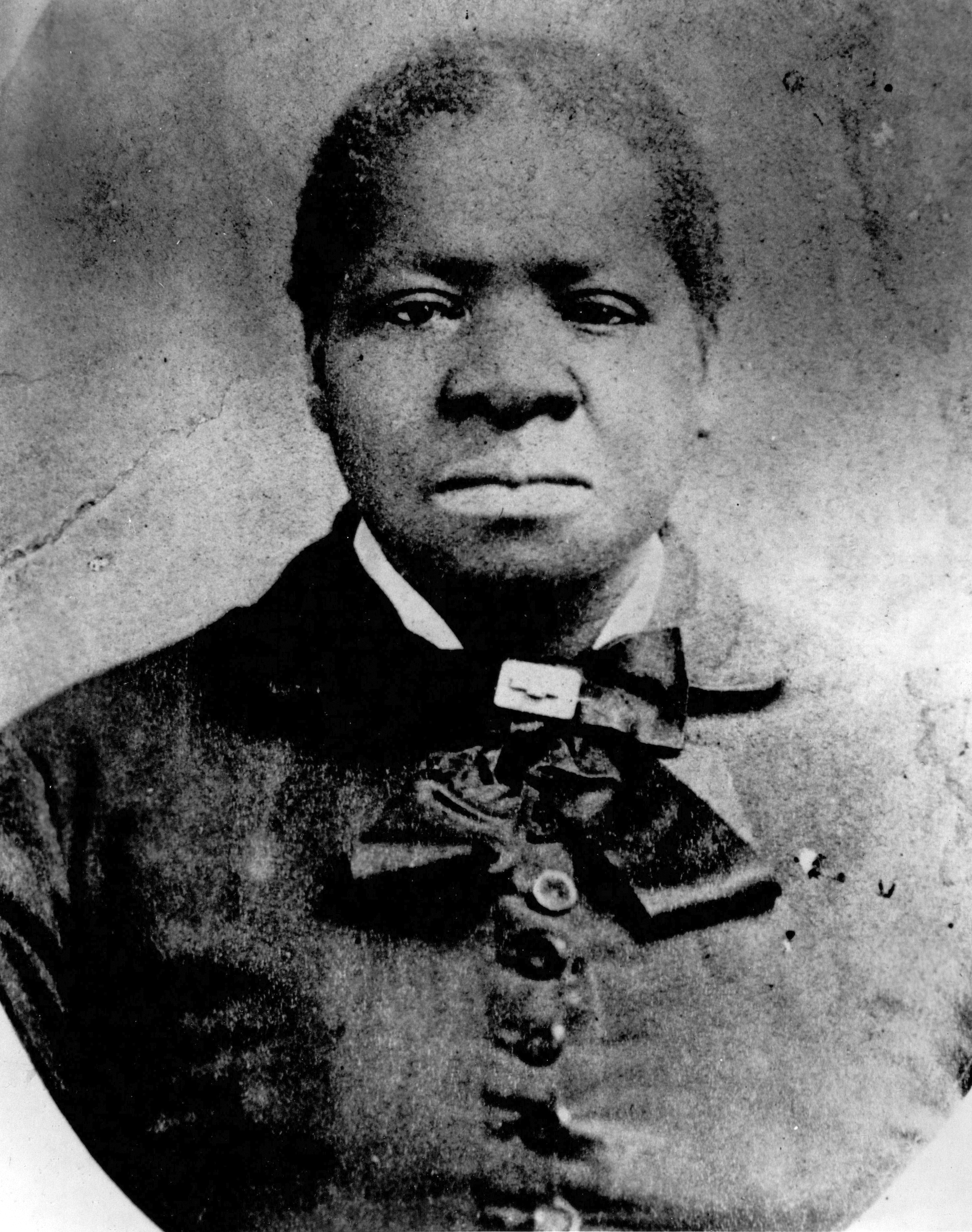
Biddy Mason, Los Angeles pioneer

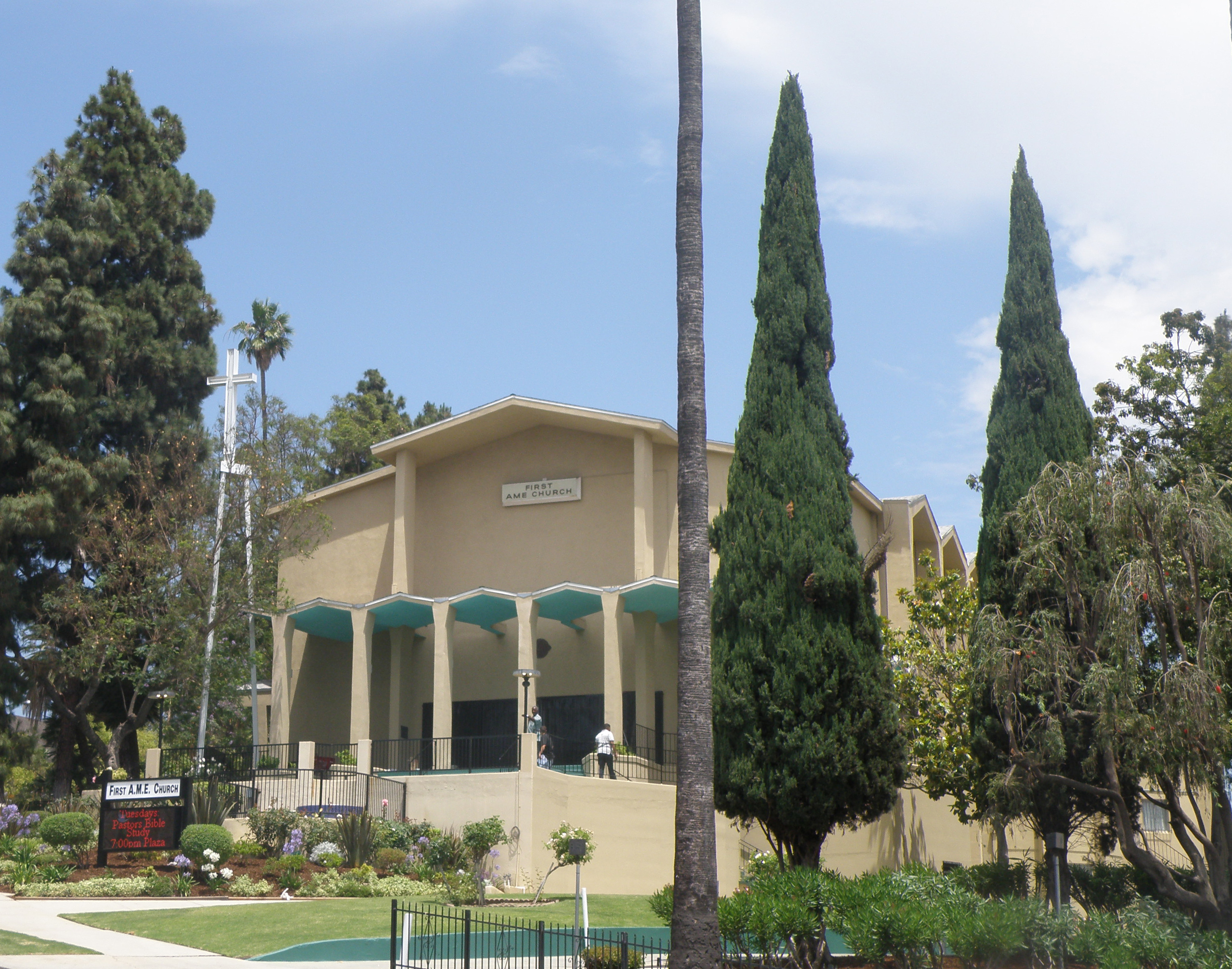
First African Methodist Episcopal Church of Los Angeles, founded in 1872

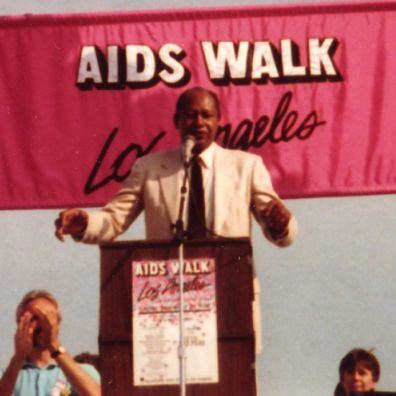
Tom Bradley speaking at AIDS Walk LA at the Paramount Studios lot in 1988

In 1781, the early non-Indian settlers in Los Angeles (or 'Los Angeles Pobladores') included upwards of two dozen Afro-Spanish individuals from the Spanish colonies in California (part of New Spain).

Pío Pico, California's last governor under Mexican rule, was of mixed Spanish, Native American, and African ancestry. Pico spent his last days in Los Angeles dying in 1894 at the home of his daughter Joaquina Pico Moreno in Los Angeles. He was buried in the old Calvary Cemetery in downtown Los Angeles. His brothers and their descendants were also early influencers in the same era.

Spanish Governor of Las Californias, Felipe de Neve called on eleven Afro-Mexican families from Sonora and Sinaloa to help build Los Angeles.

=== 19th century ===
Many white Southerners who came to California during the Gold Rush brought racist attitudes and ideals with them. In 1850, twelve black people were registered as residents of Los Angeles. Because many blacks were enslaved until the abolition of slavery occurred in 1865, few blacks migrated to Los Angeles before then. Due to the construction of the Santa Fe Railroad and a settlement increase in 1880, increasing numbers of blacks came to Los Angeles. By 1900, 2,131 African Americans, the second-largest black population in California, lived in Los Angeles.

In 1872, the First African Methodist Episcopal Church of Los Angeles (First A.M.E. or FAME) was established under the sponsorship of Biddy Mason, an African American nurse and a California real estate entrepreneur and philanthropist, and her son-in-law Charles Owens. The church now has a membership of more than 19,000 individuals.

=== 20th century ===
Between the 1890s and 1910, African Americans migrated to Los Angeles from Southern places like Texas, Shreveport, Atlanta, and New Orleans to escape the racial violence, racism, white supremacy, and bigotry of the Southern United States. The presence of the first transcontinental railroad meant that Los Angeles had a relatively high African American population for a city in the Western United States; in 1910 it had 7,599 African Americans. The first branch of the NAACP in California was established in Los Angeles in 1913. Housing segregation was a common practice in the early 20th century. Many private property deeds explicitly banned owners from selling to anyone but whites.

They also came from Oklahoma to flee Jim Crow laws and due to being intimidated by white people and white supremacist gangs such as the Ku Klux Klan.

The African American population did not significantly increase during the first Great Migration. From approximately 1920 to 1955, Central Avenue was the heart of the African American community in Los Angeles, with active rhythm and blues and jazz music scenes.

Central Avenue had two all-black segregated fire stations. Fire Station No. 30 and Fire Station No. 14 were segregated in 1924. They remained segregated until 1956 when the Los Angeles Fire Department was integrated. The listing on the National Register notes, "All-black fire stations were simultaneous representations of racial segregation and sources of community pride." In 1928, World War I veteran William J. Powell founded the Bessie Coleman Aero Club. In 1931, Powell organized the first all-black air show in the United States for the Club in Los Angeles, an event that drew 15,000 visitors. Powell also established a school to train mechanics and pilots.

World War II brought the Second Great Migration, tens of thousands of African American migrants, mostly from Louisiana, Mississippi, Arkansas, and Texas, who left segregated Southern states in search of better opportunities in California. The African American population significantly increased in the Second Great Migration of the 1940s as area factories received labor for the effort in World War II. In 1940 the black population was 63,700.

Areas in Los Angeles that were once predominantly white, such as South Central Los Angeles, Watts, and Compton became predominantly African American after the white flight.

William Parker became police chief in 1952. He largely refused to hire black police officers. During most of his tenure, those already on the force were prohibited from having white partners.

The 1965 Watts Riots were triggered by the arrest of a 21-year-old black man named Marquette Frye at 116th Street and Avalon Boulevard for driving drunk. A torrent of built-up rage erupted in the streets of Watts and South Los Angeles. An investigating commission found that the African American citizens had been denied respect and endured substandard housing, education and medical care. The King-Drew Hospital in Willowbrook opened in 1972 as a response to the area having inadequate and insufficient hospital facilities.

In 1972, Wattstax, also known as the Black-Woodstock, took place in the Los Angeles Memorial Coliseum. Over 100,000 black residents of Los Angeles attended this concert for African American pride. Later, in 1973, a documentary was released about the concert.

In 1973, Tom Bradley was elected as Mayor of Los Angeles, a role he'd hold for 20 years. L.A.'s first African American mayor, Bradley served over five terms, prior to the establishment of successive term limits, making him the longest-serving mayor of Los Angeles.

In 1991, Rodney King was beaten by police officers. His videotaped beating was controversial, and heightened racial tensions in Los Angeles. Just 13 days after the videotaped beating of King, a 15-year-old African American girl named Latasha Harlins was shot and killed by a 51-year-old Korean American store owner named Soon Ja Du after being falsely accused of stealing in a store. A jury found Du guilty of voluntary manslaughter, an offense that carries a maximum prison sentence of 16-years. However, trial judge, Joyce Karlin, sentenced Du five years of probation, four hundred hours of community service, and a $500 fine. The lenient response by the courts over the murder was one of the contributing factors to the 1992 Los Angeles riots. When four Los Angeles Police Department officers were acquitted of charges associated with the beating of Rodney King, the decision led to the 1992 Los Angeles riots.

The trial of the O. J. Simpson murder case took place in 1994 and 1995.

African Americans moved to the city for jobs in military production.

=== 21st century ===
In 2004, singer-songwriter Ray Charles's music studio on Washington Blvd. was declared a historic landmark.

Many African Americans in Los Angeles live in poverty in 2019. In 2020, 34% of homeless people in Los Angeles are African Americans despite being only 8% of the population.

In 2021, African Americans in Los Angeles County were more at risk for COVID-19. In the 2021, African Americans in Los Angeles had the highest COVID-19 hospitalization rate, as well as one of the lowest COVID-19 vaccination rates.

A 2026 article said African Americans are moving out the city in droves due to high rents, high cost of living, the city becoming unaffordable and gentrification.

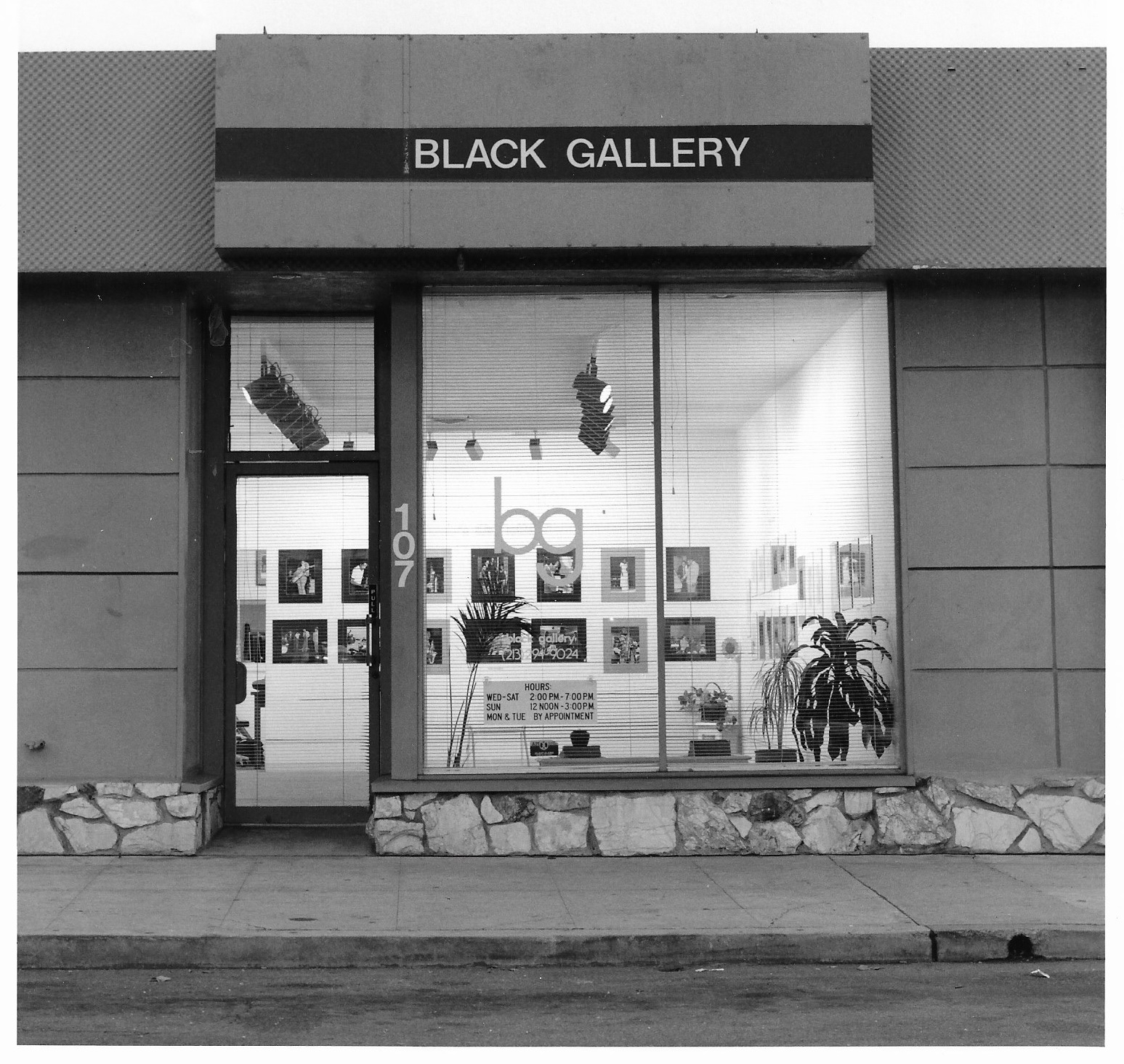
The Black Gallery (1984–1998), exhibition space for African American photographers

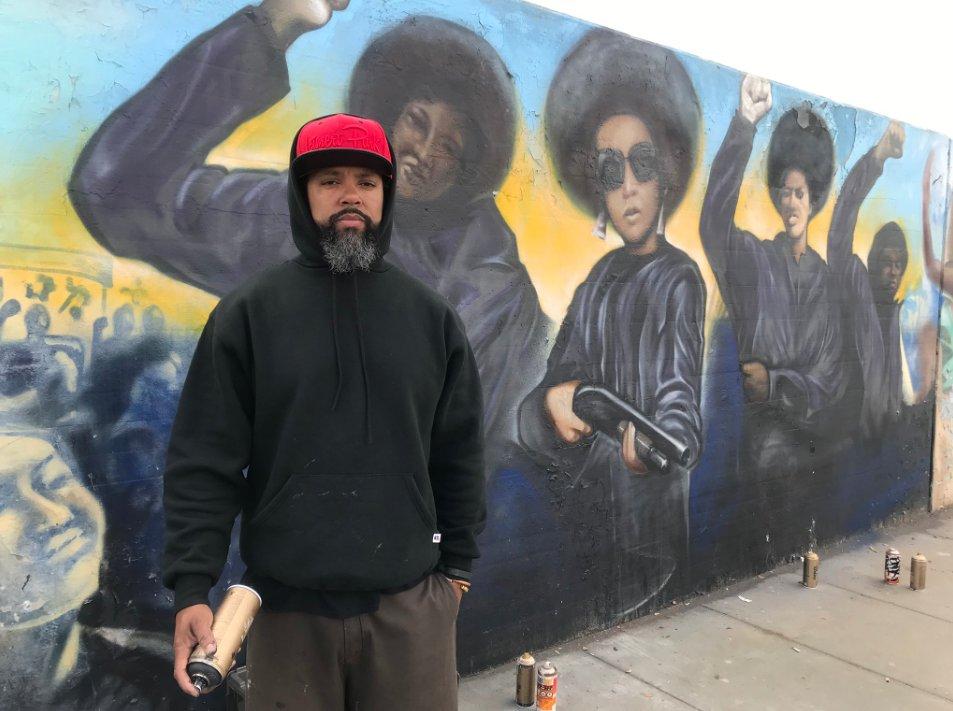
Destination Crenshaw, an open air museum of African American street art

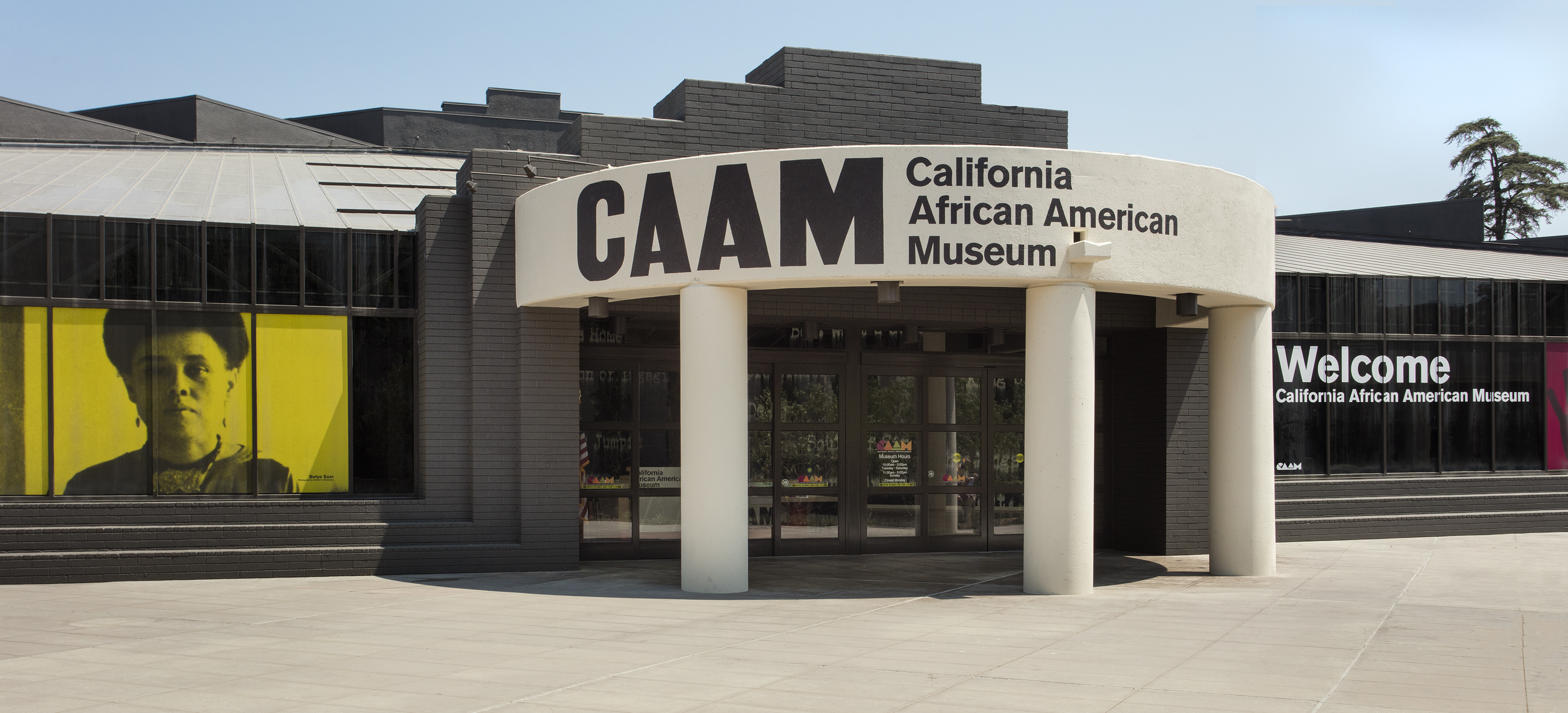
California African American Museum

== Geography and population ==
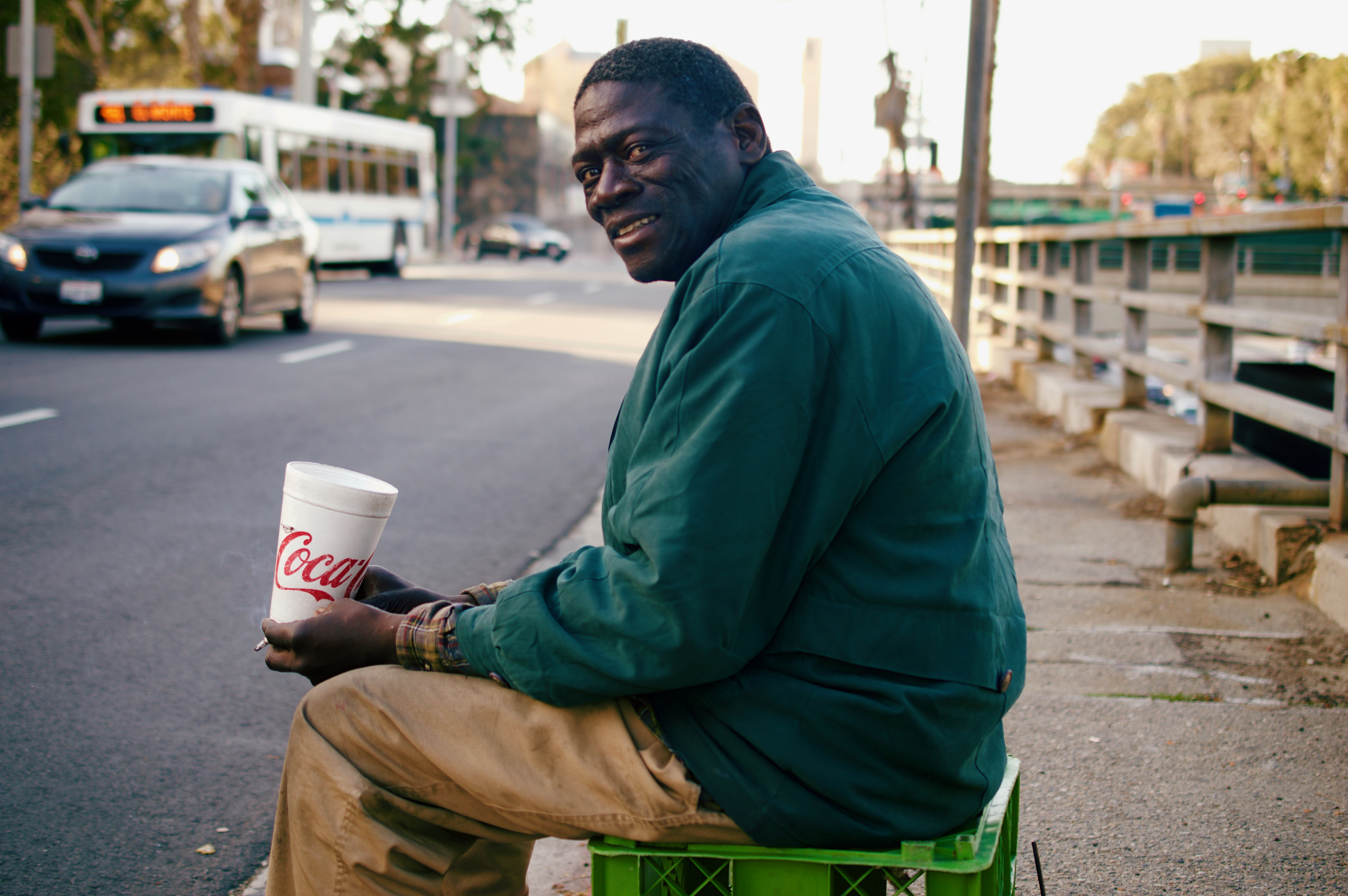
Homeless African American man in Los Angeles begging

=== 1950s and 1960s ===
Philip Garcia, a population specialist and the assistant director of institutional research for California State University, stated that a group of communities in South Los Angeles became African American by the 1950s and 1960s. These communities were Avalon, Baldwin Hills, Central, Exposition Park, Santa Barbara, South Vermont, Watts, and West Adams. Since then the Santa Barbara street was renamed Martin Luther King Jr. Boulevard. 98,685 blacks moved to Los Angeles in the period 1965 through 1970. During the same period 40,776 blacks moved out.

=== 1970s and 1980s ===
In 1970, there were 763,000 African Americans in Los Angeles. They were the second-largest minority group after the then estimated 815,000 Mexican Americans. Los Angeles had the west coast's largest black population. Between 1975 and 1980, 96,833 blacks moved to Los Angeles while 73,316 blacks left Los Angeles. Over 5,000 of the blacks moved to the Riverside-San Bernardino-Ontario area. About 2,000 to 5,000 blacks moved to the Anaheim-Santa Ana-Garden Grove area. James H. Johnson, a University of California-Los Angeles (UCLA) associate professor of geography, stated that due to affordable housing, blacks tend to choose "what is called the balance of the counties" or cities neutral to the existing major cities. In the Inland Empire, blacks tended to move to Rialto instead of Riverside and San Bernardino.

Of the blacks who left the City of Los Angeles between 1975 and 1980 who moved away from the Los Angeles area, over 5,000 moved to the Oakland, California area, about 2,000–5,000 went to San Diego, about 1,000–2,000 went to Sacramento, and about 1,000 to 2,000 went to San Jose, California. About 500–1,000 blacks moved to Fresno, Oxnard, Santa Barbara, Simi Valley, and Ventura. Johnson stated that the areas from Fresno to Ventura are "areas that traditionally blacks haven't settled in". Many blacks leaving Los Angeles who also California moved to cities in the U.S. South, including Atlanta, Charlotte, Dallas, Houston, Little Rock, New Orleans, and San Antonio. Other cities receiving Los Angeles blacks include Chicago, New York City, and Las Vegas.

=== 1990s ===
In the late 1990s, many African Americans moved away from the traditional African Americans neighborhoods, which overall reduced the black population of the City of Los Angeles and Los Angeles County. Many African Americans moved to eastern Los Angeles suburbs in Riverside County and San Bernardino County in the Inland Empire, such as Moreno Valley. From 1980 to 1990 the Inland Empire had the United States' fastest-growing black population. Between the 1980 United States census and the 1990 U.S. census, the black population increased by 119%. As of 1990 the Inland Empire had 169,128 black people.

Many new African American businesses appear in the Inland Empire, and many of these businesses have not been previously established elsewhere. The Inland Empire African American Chamber of Commerce began with six members in 1990 and the membership increased to 90 by 1996. According to Denise Hamilton of the Los Angeles Times, as of 1996 "there has been no large-scale migration from the traditional black business districts such as Crenshaw, black business people say." During the 1990s, the black population of the Moreno Valley increased by 27,500, and by 1996 13% of Moreno Valley was African American.

In the 1990s many African Americans moved to cities and areas in north Los Angeles County such as Palmdale and Lancaster and closer-in cities in Los Angeles County such as Hawthorne and Long Beach. In the 1990s, the black population of Long Beach increased by 66,800.

=== 2000s and 2010s ===
In the 2019 census, 8% of the Los Angeles County population identified as black or African American.

In the 2000s, new black immigrants from Africa, the Caribbean and the Americas have arrived in Los Angeles. Nigerians, Ethiopians, Ghanaians, Belizeans, Jamaicans, Haitians, and Trinidadians are clustered in African American neighborhoods in Los Angeles. In 2001, within the Los Angeles metropolitan area, Compton, Ladera Heights, and View Park had the highest concentration of blacks. The cities of Malibu and Newport Beach have the lowest concentrations of blacks. As of 2001, in the majority of cities within Los Angeles, Orange, Riverside, San Bernardino, and Ventura counties had black populations below 10%. From 1990 to 2010 the population of Compton, previously African-American, changed to being about 66% Latino and Hispanic. The Black percentage of the population has declined in Los Angeles in 2017, possibly due to an increase of Mexican and Central American immigrants.

== Culture ==
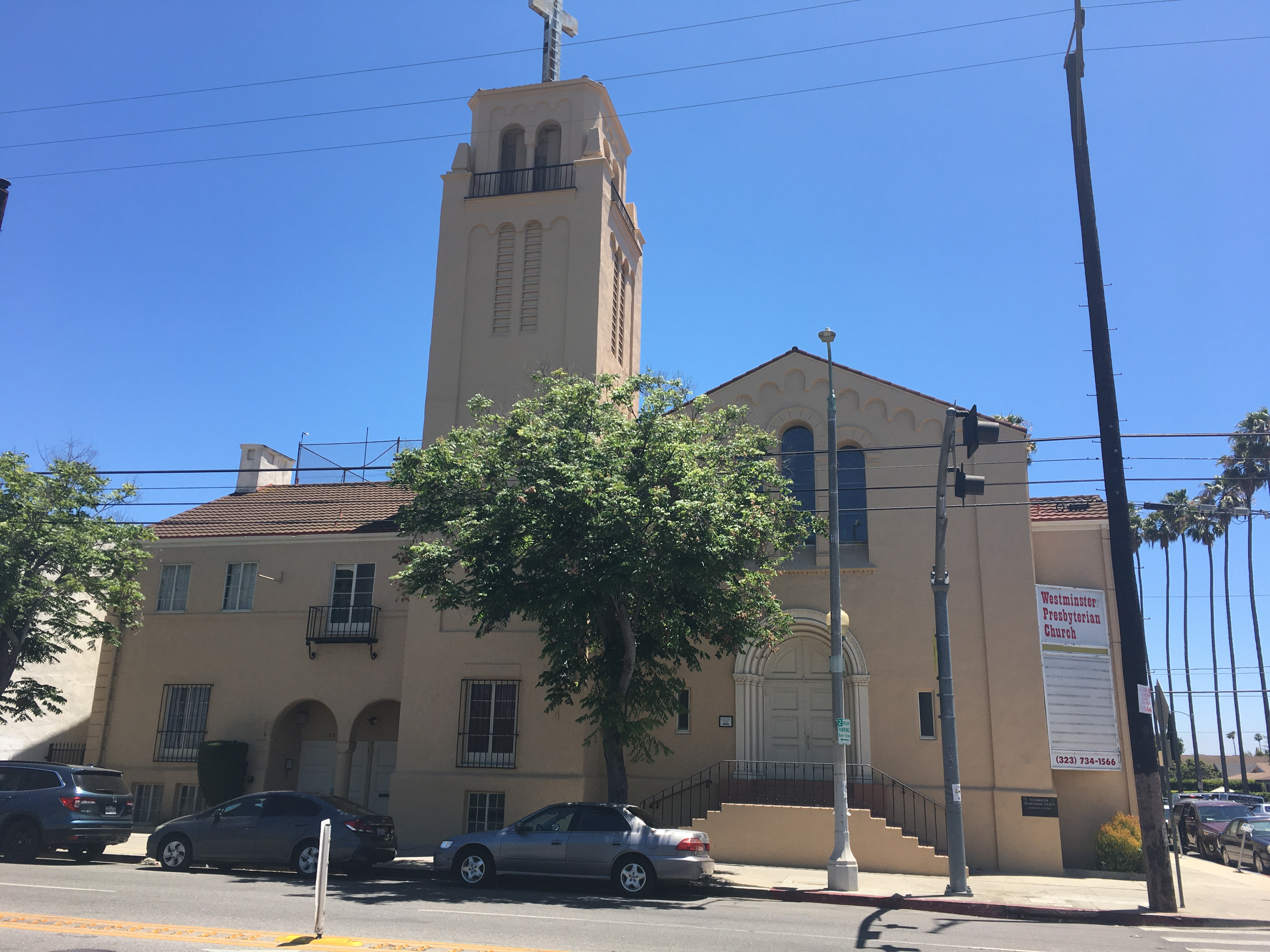
Westminster Presbyterian Church, an African American church in Los Angeles

There is a black Christian community in Los Angeles, the first black church to be established in the city was First African Methodist Episcopal Church (FAME) which was organized in the year 1872.

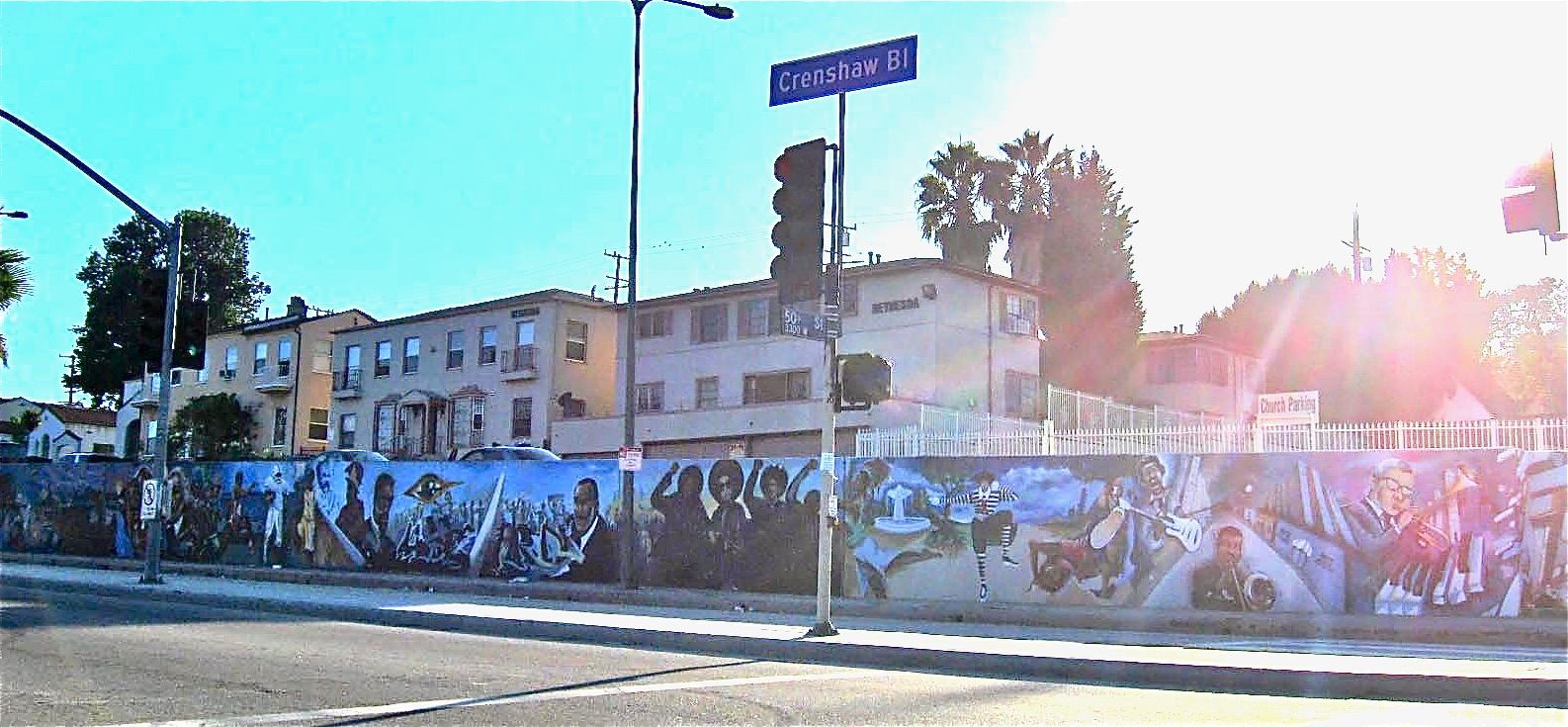
African American mural in Crenshaw

The Compton Cowboys formed in the late 1990s and are a group of friends from childhood who use horseback riding and equestrian culture to provide a positive influence on inner-city youth, and to combat negative stereotypes about African Americans in the city of Compton.

African Americans in Los Angeles have contributed to gangsta rap, particularly in the early years between 1988 until 1992. African Americans influenced West Coast hip hop with African American rappers such as Ice-T, DJ Quik, Coolio, Eazy-E, Ice Cube and Dr. Dre.

There are numerous black-owned soul food restaurants in Los Angeles.

There is a black Muslim community in Los Angeles, and Islam has had a large influence on the African American population in California. African American make up around 15% of mosque attendants in Southern California in 2021.

There are numerous graffiti murals, dedicated to African Americans in the city, such as the Crenshaw Wall located in Destination Crenshaw, an African American open-air museum.

There is also a Garifuna museum in the city.

=== Gangs ===
Restrictive covenants in the 1920s forced Blacks into specific areas of LA, leading to overcrowding and housing congestion, especially in the Central Avenue area. Blacks of the time fought back against these discriminatory pieces of legislation, which led to strife that ensued between Whites and Blacks. White gangs at the time, such as the Spook Hunters, attacked Black youth in the neighborhoods and communities that surrounded them. Raymond White was one of the original founders of the Black club the Businessmen. He proclaimed that it was almost impossible to pass by Alameda Blvd at the time because the White gangs would always be there waiting for them.

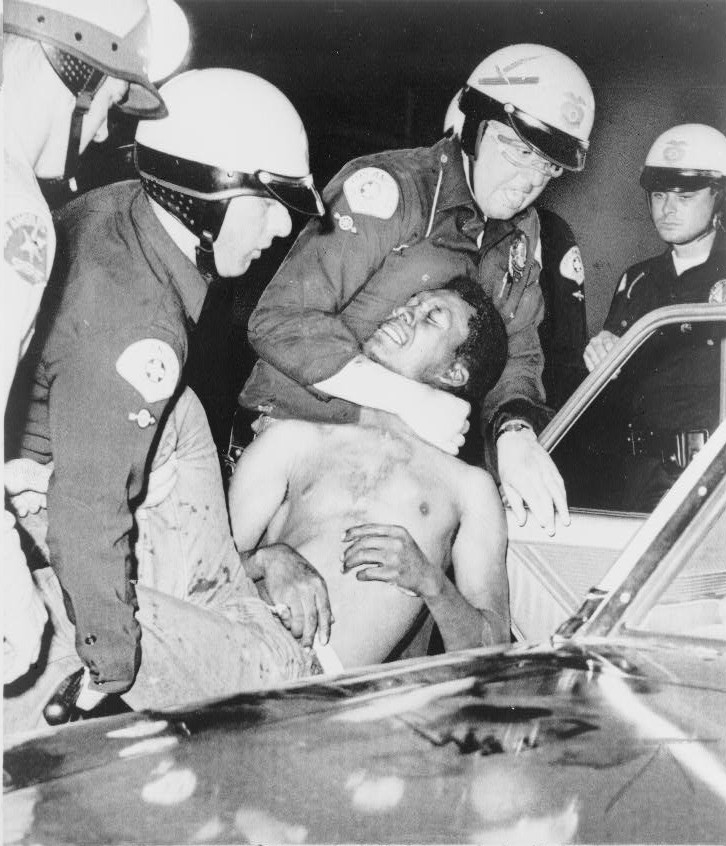
Police officers arrest a Black man during the Watts riots, a week long uprising against the racist practices displayed by the Los Angeles Police Department at the time.

Black gangs first made an appearance in the late 20's and early 30's on the Eastside of Los Angeles, around the Central and Vernon Avenues near Jefferson High School. The Blacks gangs that formed during this time were aimed at protecting Black communities and defending them against attacks from White gangs. During the mid 40's, more African American gangs began to rise. Some of the gangs gave themselves distinctive names such as "Purple Hearts" and others go by the name of the street they represented. Although these gangs were making an appearance, the two gangs that became most notable that are still very big today, are the Crips and Bloods, both of which trace their origins back to the 1960s.

White gangs eventually started fading from the LA area in the 1960s, and the Black gangs that were initially created to protect Black communities ended up turning against their own brethren. The Watts riots in 1965 was the nail in the coffin that put an end to most Black gang on Black gang violence, and many gangs ended up siding with one another taking political stances against police brutality, as displayed in the Watts riots.

=== Lesbian, gay and bisexual ===
In 2007, 4% of African American adults in Los Angeles County identified as lesbian, gay, or bisexual.

Most Black LGBTQIA+ persons live in Black neighborhoods. Of black LGBTQ+ persons, 38% lived in South Los Angeles, 33% lived in the South Bay, and less than 1% lived in the Los Angeles Westside. Mignon R. Moore, the author of "Black and Gay in L.A.: The Relationships Black Lesbians and Gay Men Have to Their Racial and Religious Communities," wrote that black LGBTQ+ people had a tendency to not have openness about their sexuality and to not discuss their sexuality, and also that "they were not a visible group in neighborhoods like Carson and Ladera Heights".

== Little Ethiopia ==
Little Ethiopia is home to the third largest Ethiopian American after Washington, D.C. and Minneapolis, Minnesota. Little Ethiopia is the only area in the city to recognize the culture of the African continent. There are many Ethiopian restaurants in the neighborhood, serving Ethiopian cuisine.

== Discrimination ==
Blacks in Los Angeles County are often affected by homelessness, poverty and incarceration due to discrimination. Anti-black hate crimes increased in Los Angeles in 2023. African Americans in Los Angeles are also more likely to be killed by police officers; with African Americans representing 24% of law enforcement killings, from 2000 to 2023. Racial violence against black women in Los Angeles remains high.

African Americans experienced housing discrimination, redlining and segregation in the Los Angeles region.

== Crime ==
Per 2018 data, approximately 39% of homicide victims in the city are African Americans and they account for about 24% to 37% of all violent crime victims.

== Gentrification ==
African American neighborhoods in South Los Angeles have been gentrified. Many Latinos have moved to their historical neighborhoods.

== Suburbs ==
African Americans have faced significant challenges when attempting to integrate into predominantly white suburban areas. Following 1960, they began to establish a presence in a limited number of suburbs, which triggered a rapid exodus of white residents during the white flight from places such as Compton and later Inglewood. However, there were notable exceptions for suburbs including Pasadena and Monrovia, where black communities had established longstanding historical ties. After 1980, the movement of African Americans into suburban regions increased, with many residing alongside Hispanic populations in emerging majority-minority suburbs such as Compton, Inglewood, Hawthorne, Carson and Gardena.

== Notable people ==
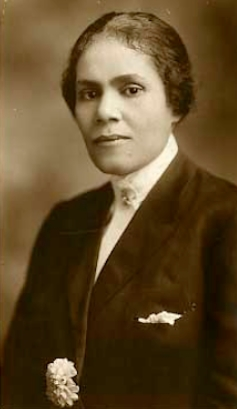
Georgia Ann Robinson, police officer

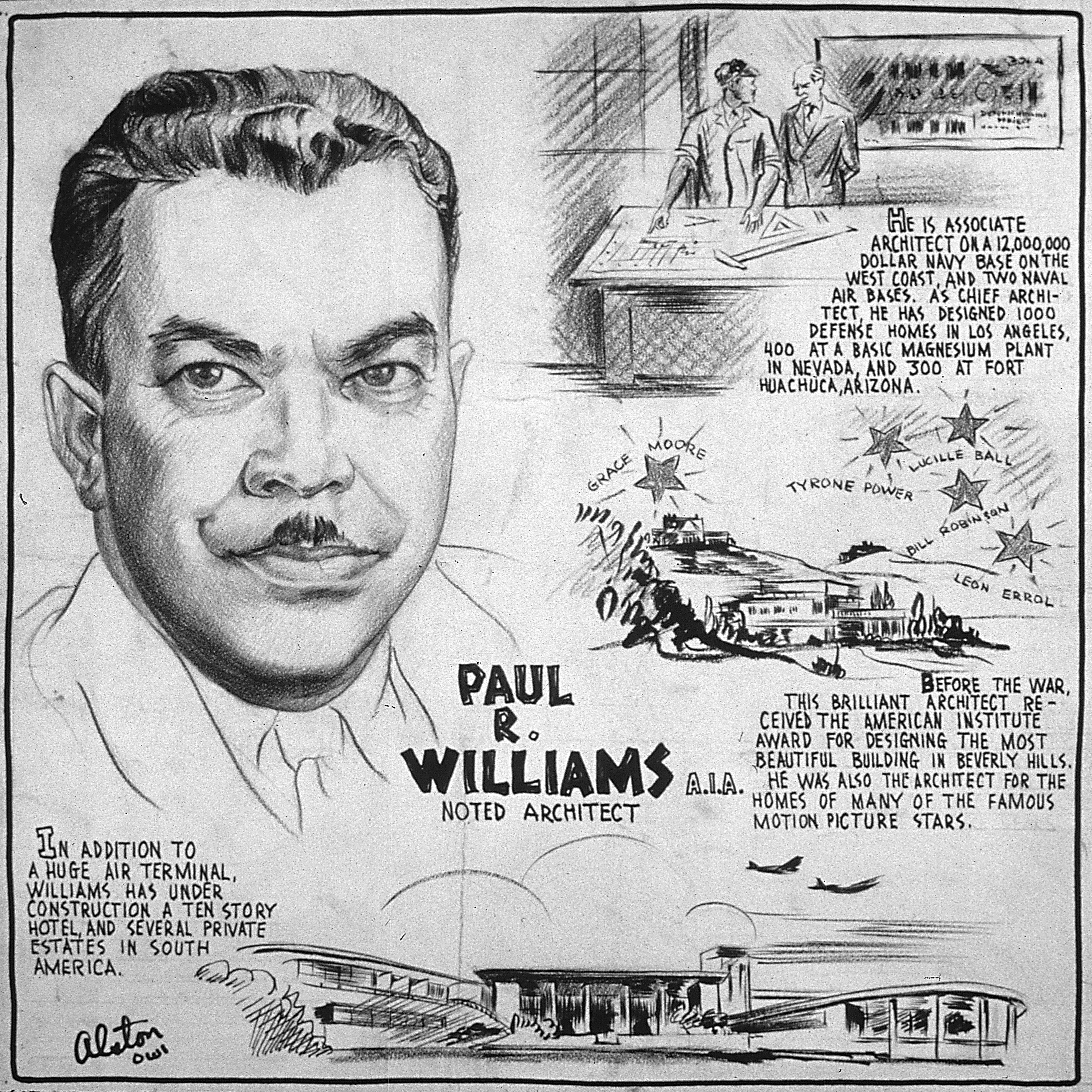
Paul Williams, architect

- Jhené Aiko (born 1988), singer of African American, Japanese, Dominican, Spanish, Native American and German-Jewish descent.
- Yvonne Brathwaite Burke (born 1932), an attorney from Los Angeles, became the first African American woman in the California Legislature and in 1972 became the first African American woman elected to the U.S. Congress from the West Coast. She served in Congress from 1973 until the end of 1978.
- Doja Cat (born 1995), South African American musician born and raised in Los Angeles.
- Nat King Cole (1919–1965), singer and jazz pianist
- Dorothy Dandridge (1922–1965), the first black actress to be nominated for an Academy Award for Best Actress in 1954.
- Mervyn Dymally (1926–2012), teacher and politician, the first African American to serve in the California State Senate. He went on to be elected as Lieutenant Governor in 1974.
- Larry Elder (born 1952), talk radio host and attorney
- Meagan Good (born 1981), actress and model
- Tiffany Haddish (born 1979), actress and comedian of Eritrean descent.
- Nipsey Hussle (1985–2019), rapper of Eritrean descent.
- Etta James (1938–2012), noted singer born the Watts neighborhood of Los Angeles; in 1993, she was inducted into the Rock and Roll Hall of Fame
- Magic Johnson (born 1959), basketball player with the Los Angeles Lakers and businessmen; in 1981 he signed a 25-year, $25-million contract with the Lakers, which was the highest-paying contract in sports history up to that point.
- Florence Griffith Joyner (also known as Flo-Jo; 1959–1998), track and field hurdle athlete; she won three gold medals at the 1988 Olympics in Seoul and was considered the fastest woman of all time.
- Carl Lewis (born 1961), track and field athlete; he came to prominence at the 1984 Summer Olympics in Los Angeles, where he won four gold medals.
- Tim Moore (comedian) (1887–1958), actor and comedian
- Regina King (born 1971), actress and film director
- Charles Mingus (1922–1979), jazz musician; was born in Los Angeles and raised largely in the Watts area; he recorded in a band in Los Angeles in the 1940s.
- Karyn Parsons (born 1966), actress and children book author
- Judy Pace (1942-2026), actress and mulitiple NAACP Image Awards winner
- Georgia Ann Robinson (1879–1961), police officer; she was the first black woman to be hired by the LAPD in 1919. She began as a volunteer jail matron, and was later hired as an official policewoman. Robinson worked mainly on juvenile cases and cases involving black women.
- Lela Rochon (born 1964), actress, born in Los Angeles and raised in Torrance, California
- Tracee Ellis Ross (born 1972) , actress and bussinesswomen
- Tavis Smiley (born 1964), talk show host and author
- Gilbert D. Smith (born 1933/1934) first African-American mayor of Carson, California
- Emma “Ginger” Smock (1920–1995), jazz violinist and bandleader who made her way into the LA jazz scene during WWII. The vast majority of male musicians were drafted for the war effort, which in turn made restaurant owners, bar owners, and bandleaders alike much more willing to hire female musicians to perform in their venues. This turn of events allowed Ginger Smock to infiltrate the Central Avenue jazz scene and make a name for herself.
- Kofi Siriboe (born 1994), actor and model
- Tyga (1989), rapper, of Black and Vietnamese ancestry.
- Karrueche Tran (born 1988), model, of African American and Vietnamese descent and identifies as Blasian
- Maxine Waters (born 1938), politician
- Paul R. Williams (1894–1980), architect; Williams became a certified architect in 1921, and the first certified African-American architect west of the Mississippi River.
- Jody Watley (born 1959), singer and actress
- Serena Williams (born 1981), tennis player; she was raised in Los Angeles, and in 2002 she became the Women's Tennis Association's World No. 1 player.
Notable African American politicians from Los Angeles

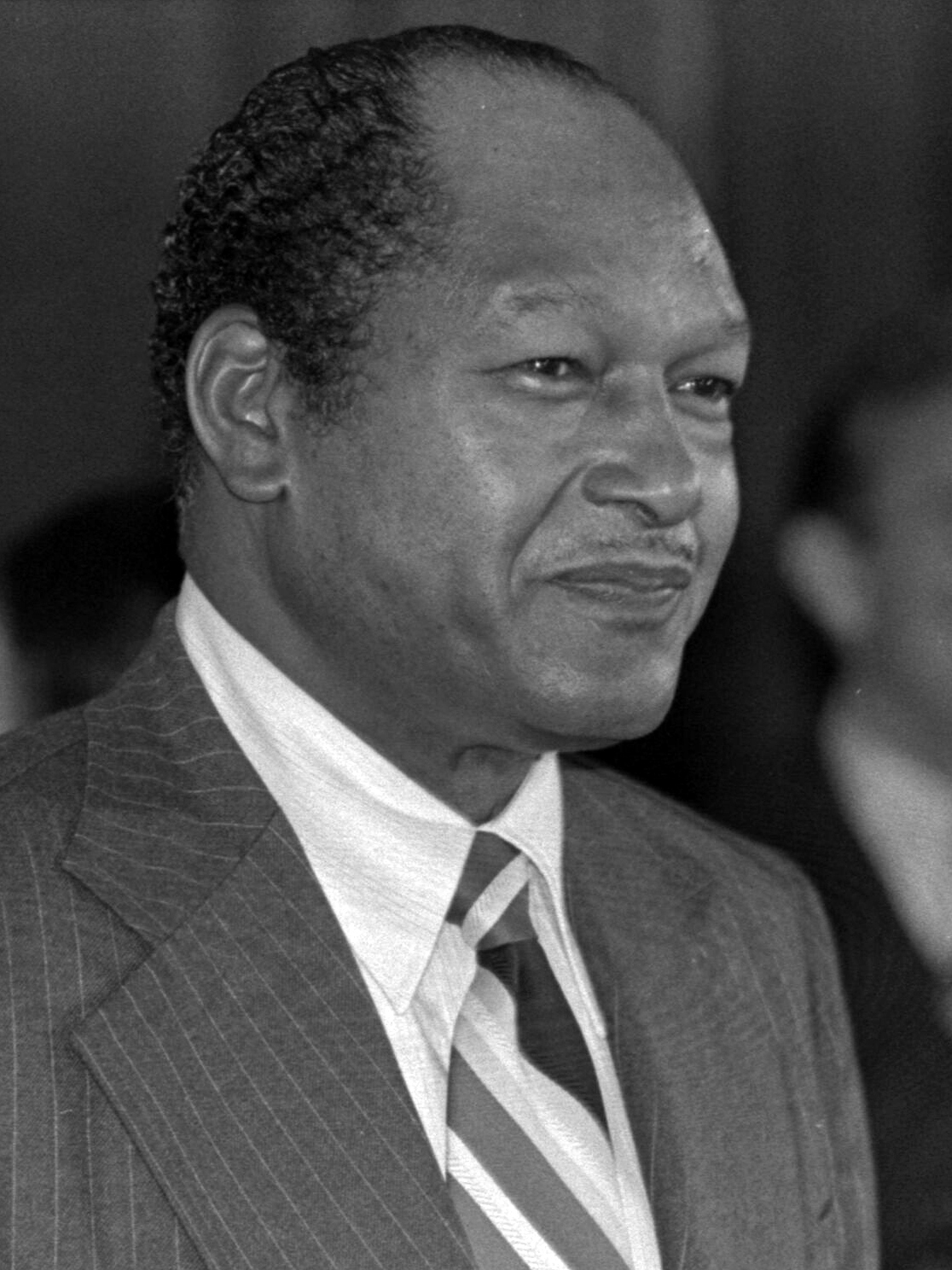
Tom Bradley

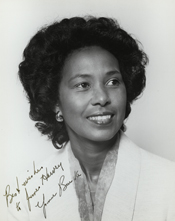
Yvonne Brathwaite Burke

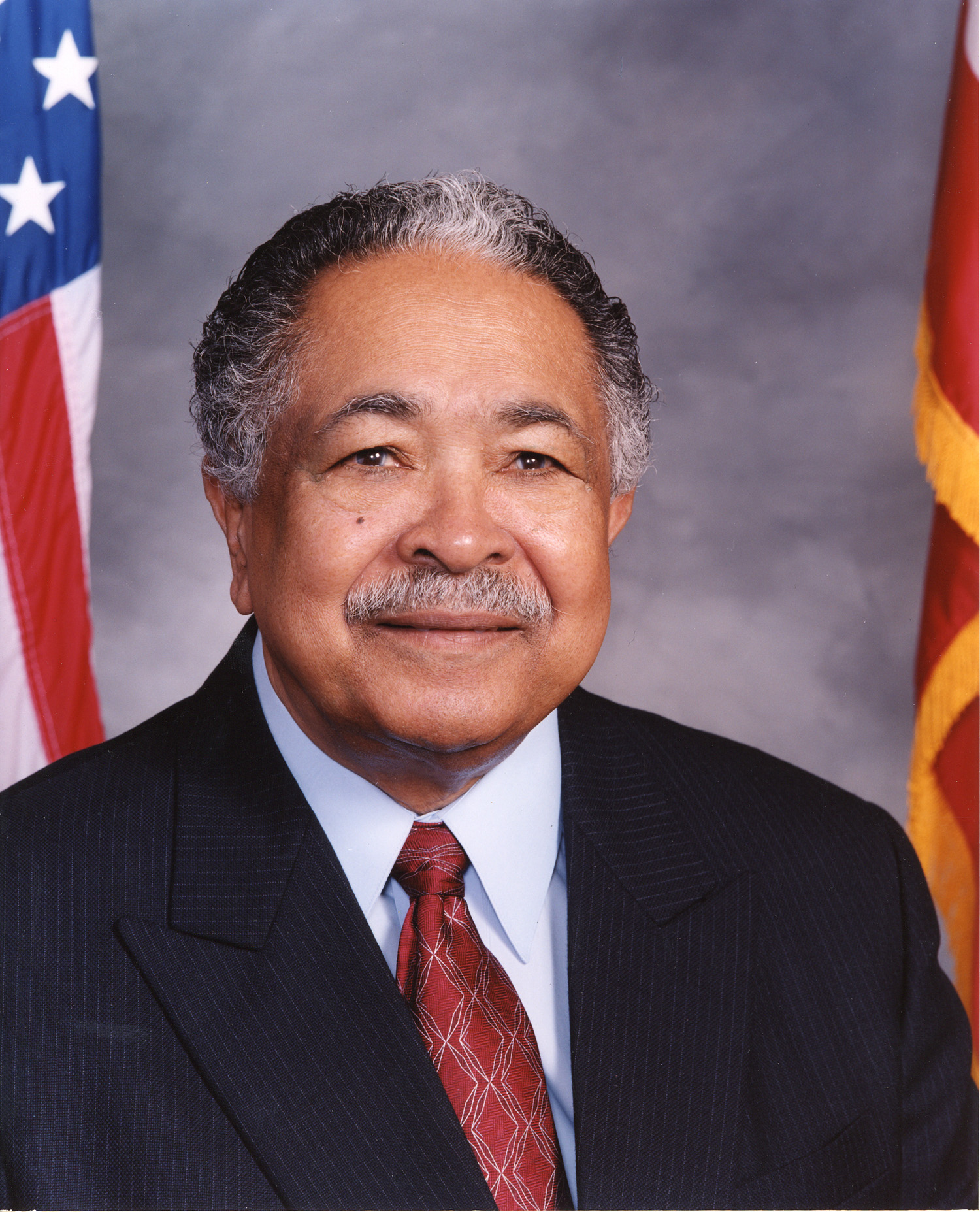
Mervyn Dymally

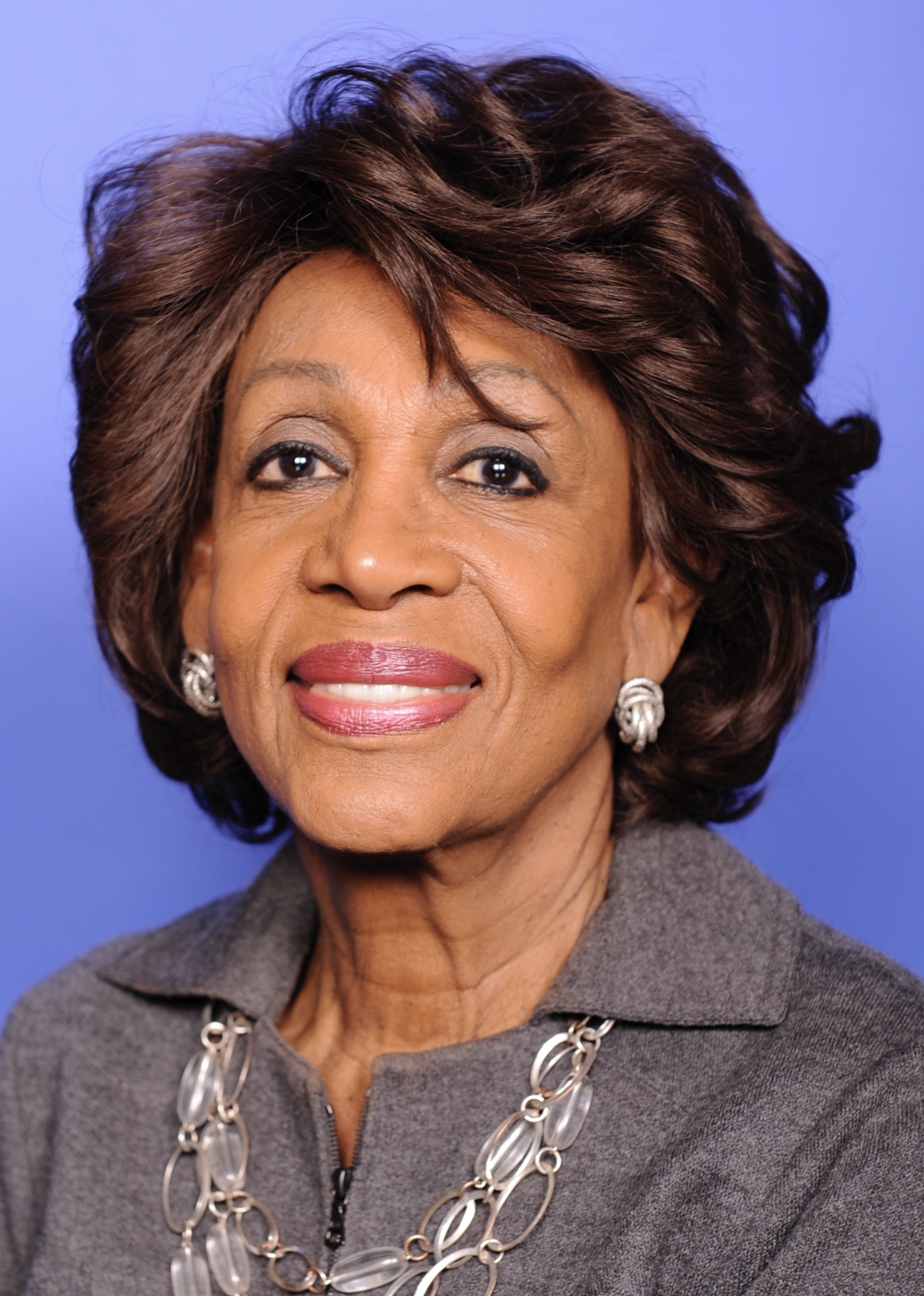
Maxine Waters
Notable African American musicians from Los Angeles

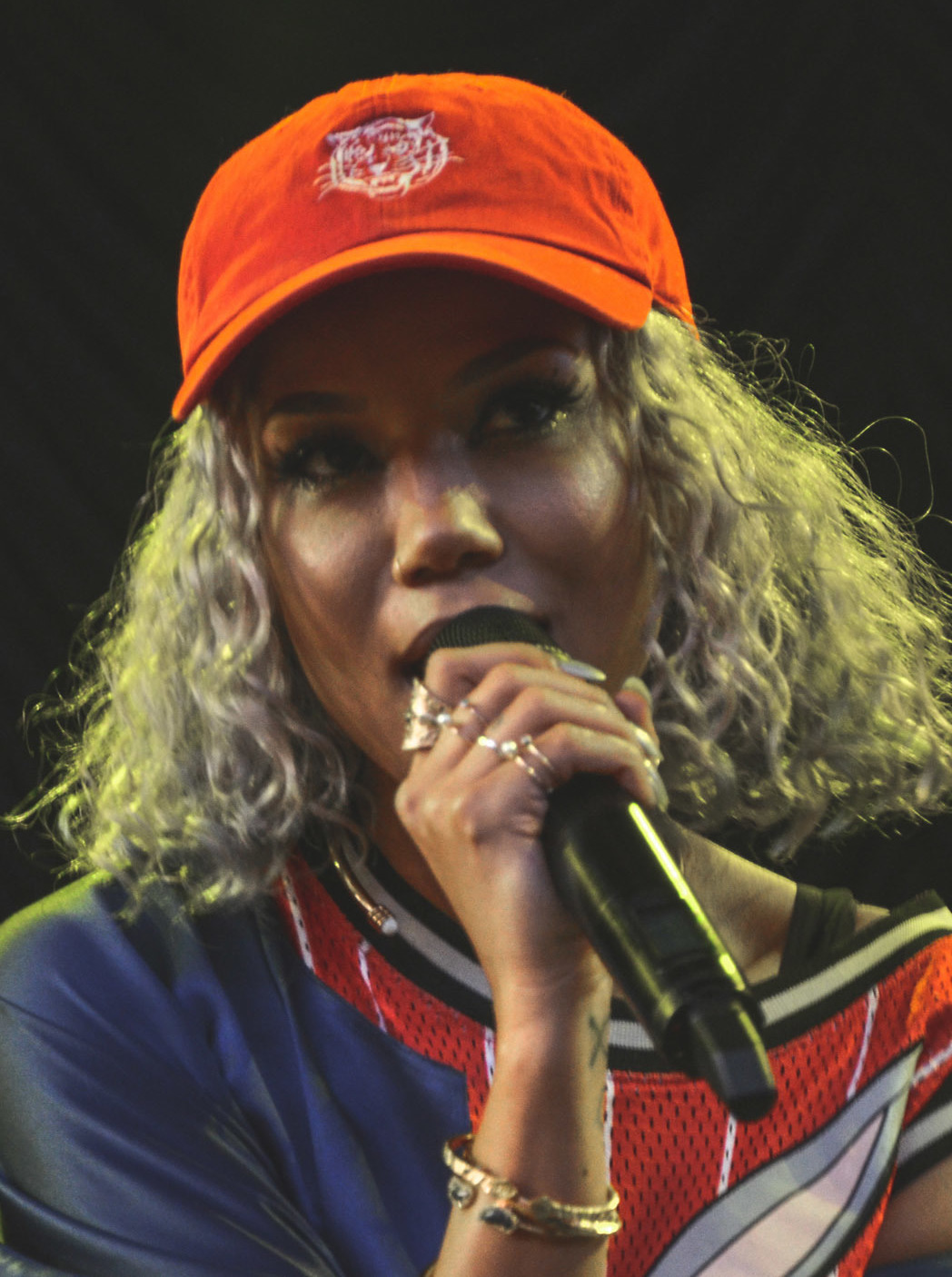
Jhené Aiko, singer

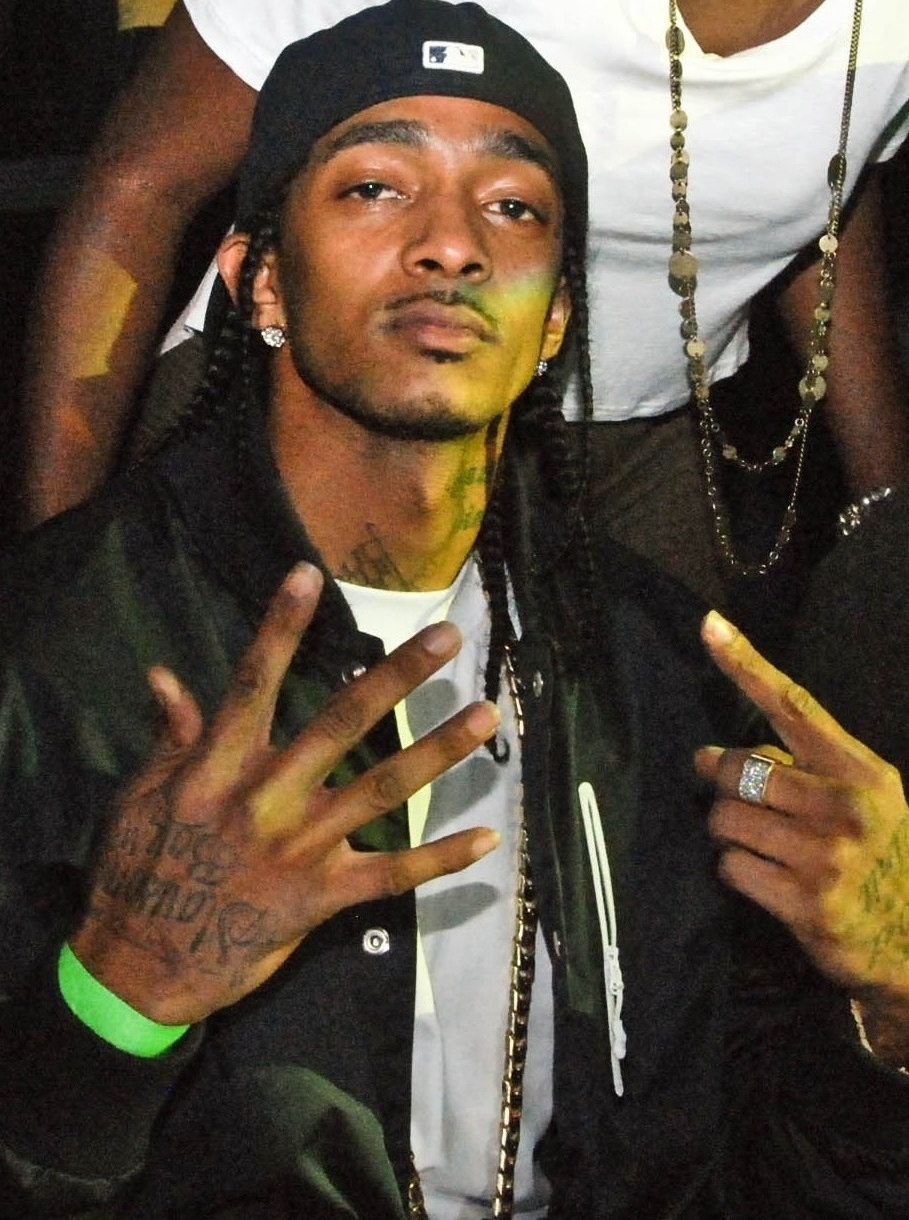
Nipsey Hussle, rapper

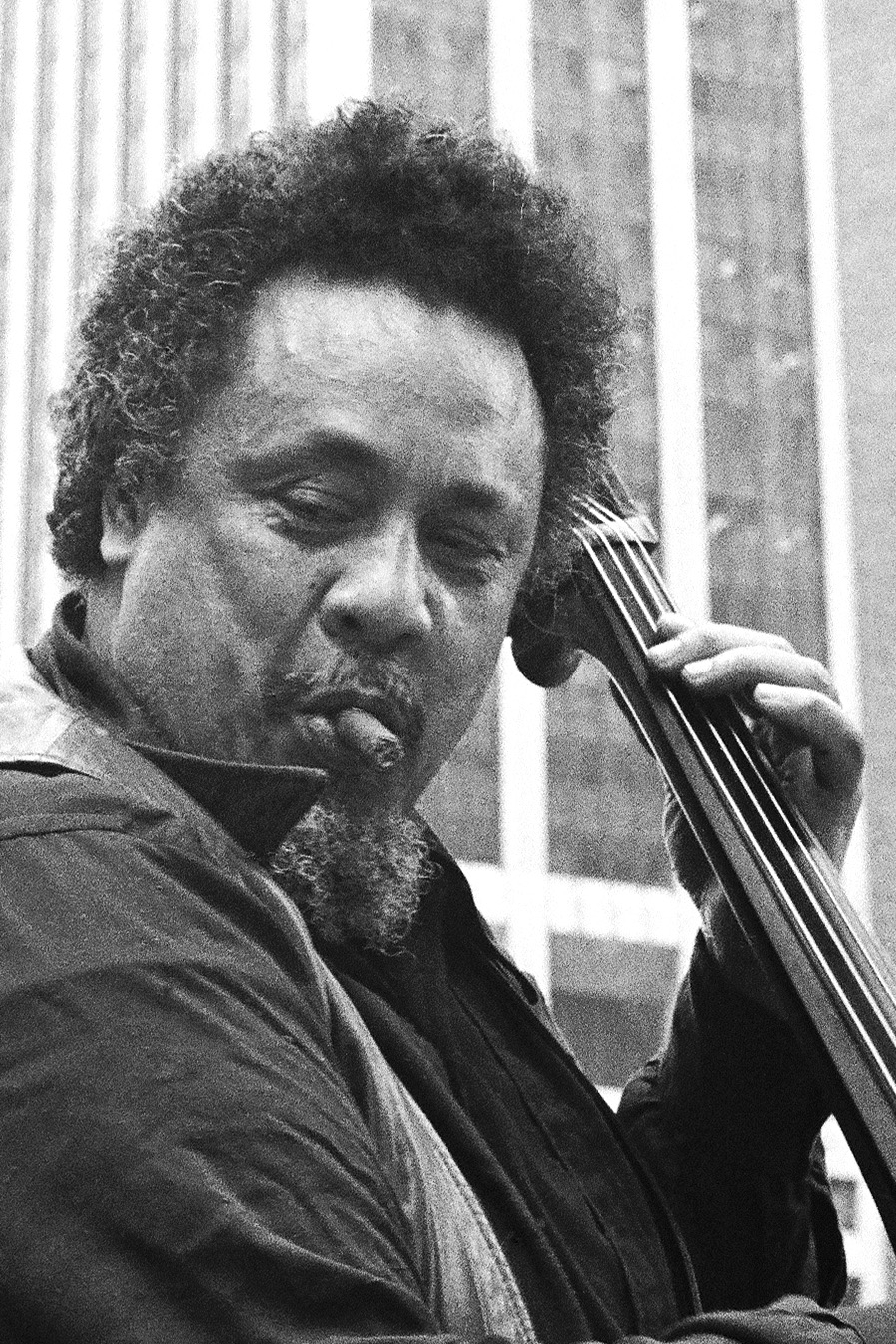
Charles Mingus, jazz musician

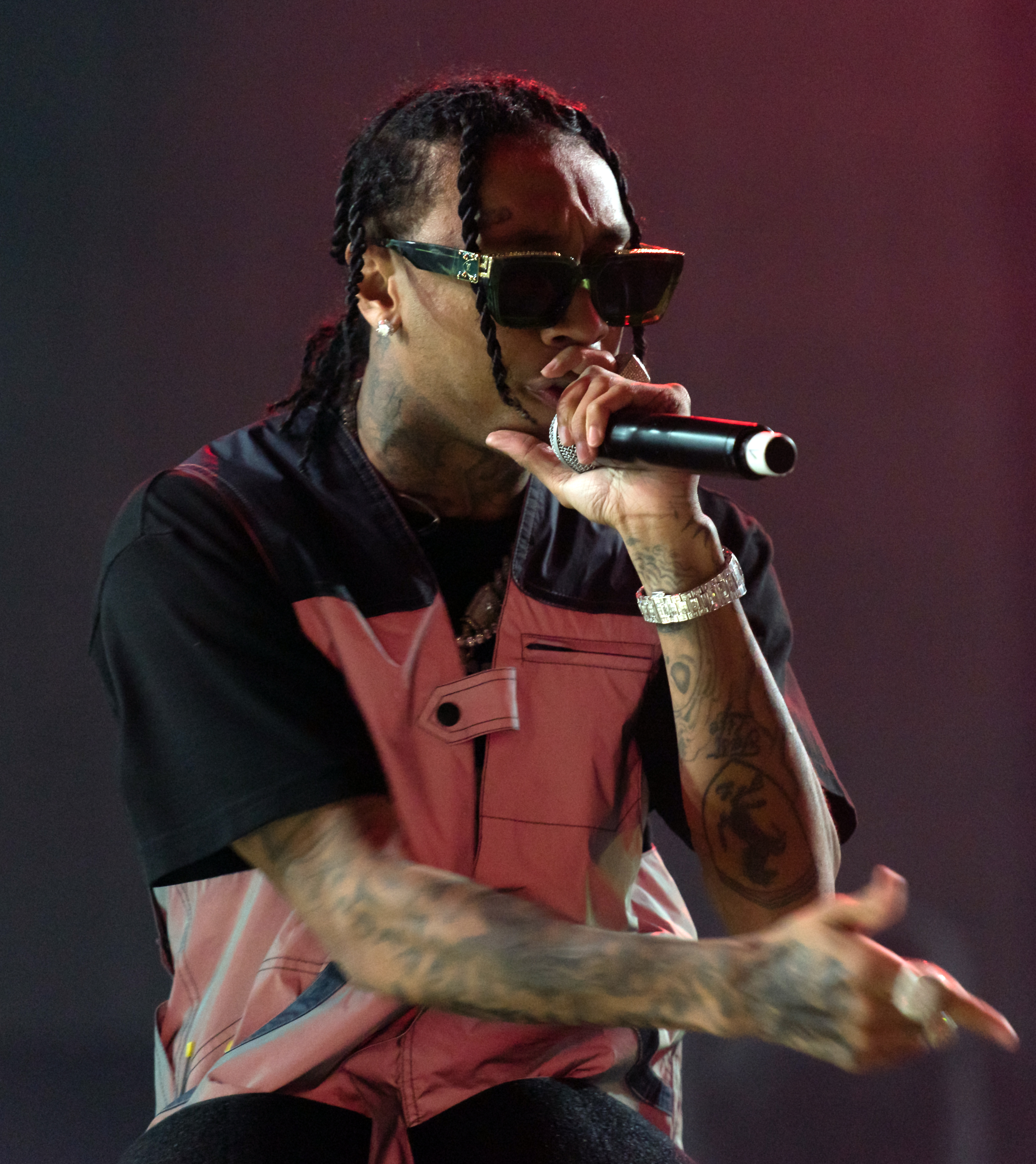
Tyga, rapper

== See also ==
- Bibliography of California history
- Bibliography of Los Angeles
- Demographics of Los Angeles
- African American mayors in California
- Ethnic groups in Los Angeles
- Little Ethiopia, Los Angeles
- Outline of the history of Los Angeles
- Leimert Park, Los Angeles
- California African American Museum
- History of Armenian Americans in Los Angeles

== Other reading ==
- Flamming, Douglas. Bound for Freedom: Black Los Angeles in Jim Crow America (The George Gund Foundation imprint in African American studies). University of California Press, August 1, 2006. ISBN 0520249909, 9780520249905.
- Hunt, Darnell and Ana-Christina Ramón (editors). Black Los Angeles: American Dreams and Racial Realities. NYU Press, April 19, 2010. ISBN 0814773060, 9780814773062.
- Kurashige, Scott. The Shifting Grounds of Race: Black and Japanese Americans in the Making of Multiethnic Los Angeles. Princeton University Press, March 15, 2010. ISBN 1400834007, 9781400834006.
- Pulido, Laura. Black, Brown, Yellow, and Left: Radical Activism in Los Angeles (Volume 19 of American crossroads). University of California Press, January 1, 2006. ISBN 0520245202, 9780520245204.
- Sides, Josh. L.A. City Limits: African American Los Angeles from the Great Depression to the Present. University of California Press, June 1, 2006. ISBN 0520248309, 9780520248304.
- Sonenshein, Raphael. Politics in Black and White: Race and Power in Los Angeles. Princeton University Press, 1993. ISBN 0691025487, 9780691025483.
- Tolbert, Emory J. The UNIA and Black Los Angeles: ideology and community in the American Garvey movement (Volume 3 of A CAAS monograph series, Volume 3 of Afro-American culture and society). Center for Afro-American Studies, University of California, Los Angeles, 1980. ISBN 0934934045, 9780934934046.
- Widener, Daniel. Black Arts West: Culture and Struggle in Postwar Los Angeles. Duke University Press, January 1, 2009.
