= Politics in Black and White =

Politics in Black and White: Race and Power in Los Angeles is the first book by Raphael Sonenshein. It deals with racial politics in Los Angeles.
