= Raphael Sonenshein =

American political scientist

Raphael J. Sonenshein (born November 10, 1949, in Nutley, New Jersey) is Executive Director of the Pat Brown Institute for Public Affairs at California State University, Los Angeles and was previously a professor of political science at California State University, Fullerton, where he also served as chairman of the department. An instructor at California State University, Fullerton from 1982 to 2012, Sonenshein holds a bachelor's degree in public policy from Princeton University and a doctorate in political science from Yale University. His books, Politics in Black and White: Race and Power in Los Angeles and The City at Stake: Secession, Reform, and the Battle for Los Angeles detail the political history of Los Angeles in the last fifty years. He is currently working on a third book. Sonenshein recently returned to the United States after completing a semester teaching in Paris on a Fulbright Scholarship. Sonenshein recently transferred to California State University, Los Angeles, where he was appointed Executive Director of the Edmund G. "Pat" Brown Institute of Public Affairs.

He was executive director of the Los Angeles Appointed Charter Reform Commission, which, along with the Los Angeles Elected Charter Reform Commission that operated simultaneously and with the same mandate, created a "unified charter" proposal for the ballot that provided the first successful and comprehensive update to the city's 1925 charter. The charter measure achieved a 60 percent approval at the polls in June 1999. It boosted the mayor's power and led to the creation of neighborhood councils and area planning commissions.

He is a nephew of retired U.S. Navy Rear Admiral Nathan Sonenshein. He currently resides in Santa Monica. Sonenshein is also a frequent editor and writer for the Jewish Journal.

== Books ==
- Politics in Black and White: Race and Power in Los Angeles. Princeton University Press, 1994. ISBN 978-0-691-02548-3
- The City at Stake: Secession, Reform, and the Battle for Los Angeles. Princeton University Press, 2004. ISBN 978-0-691-12603-6
