= University Park, Los Angeles =

University Park
- Neighborhood of Los Angeles
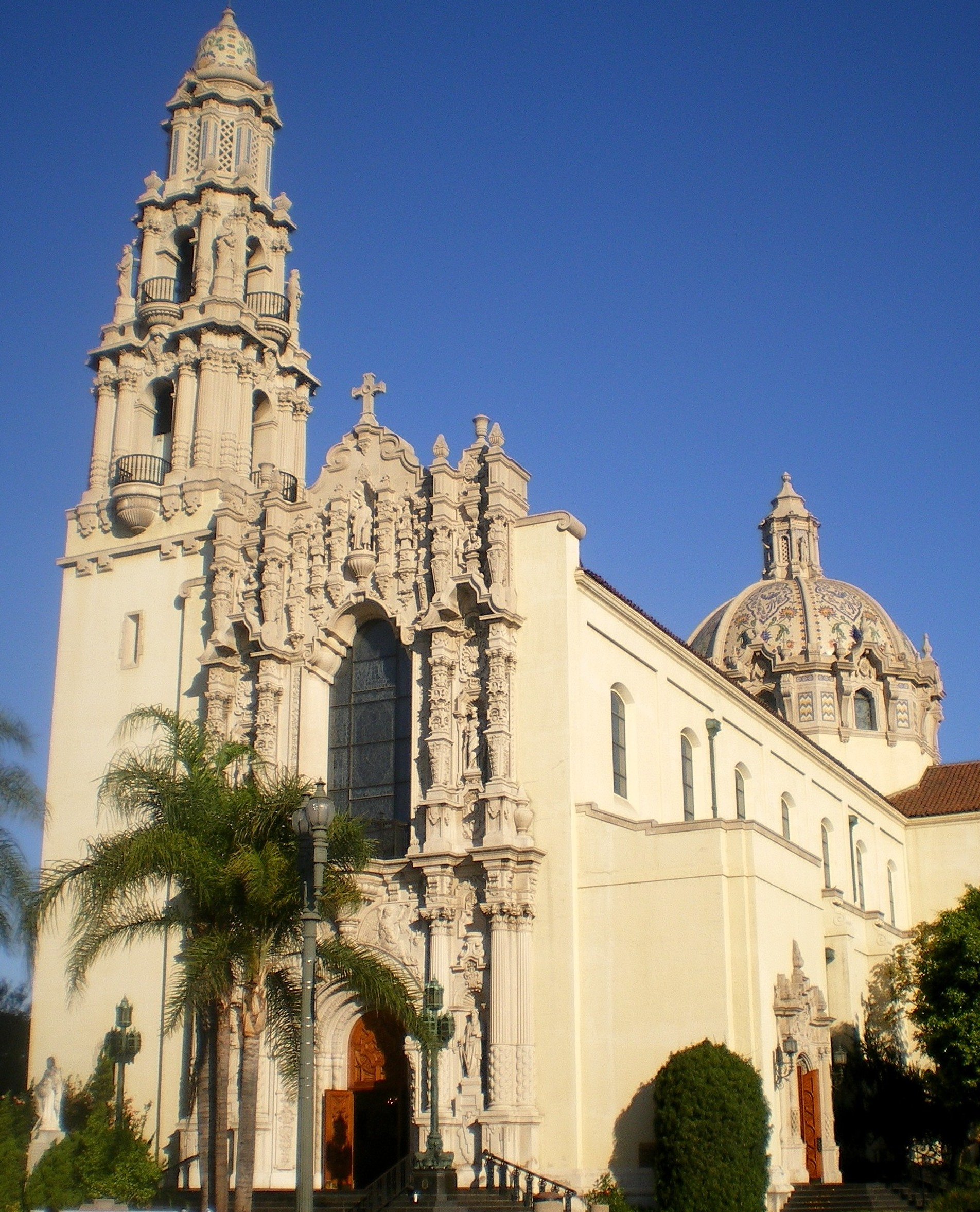
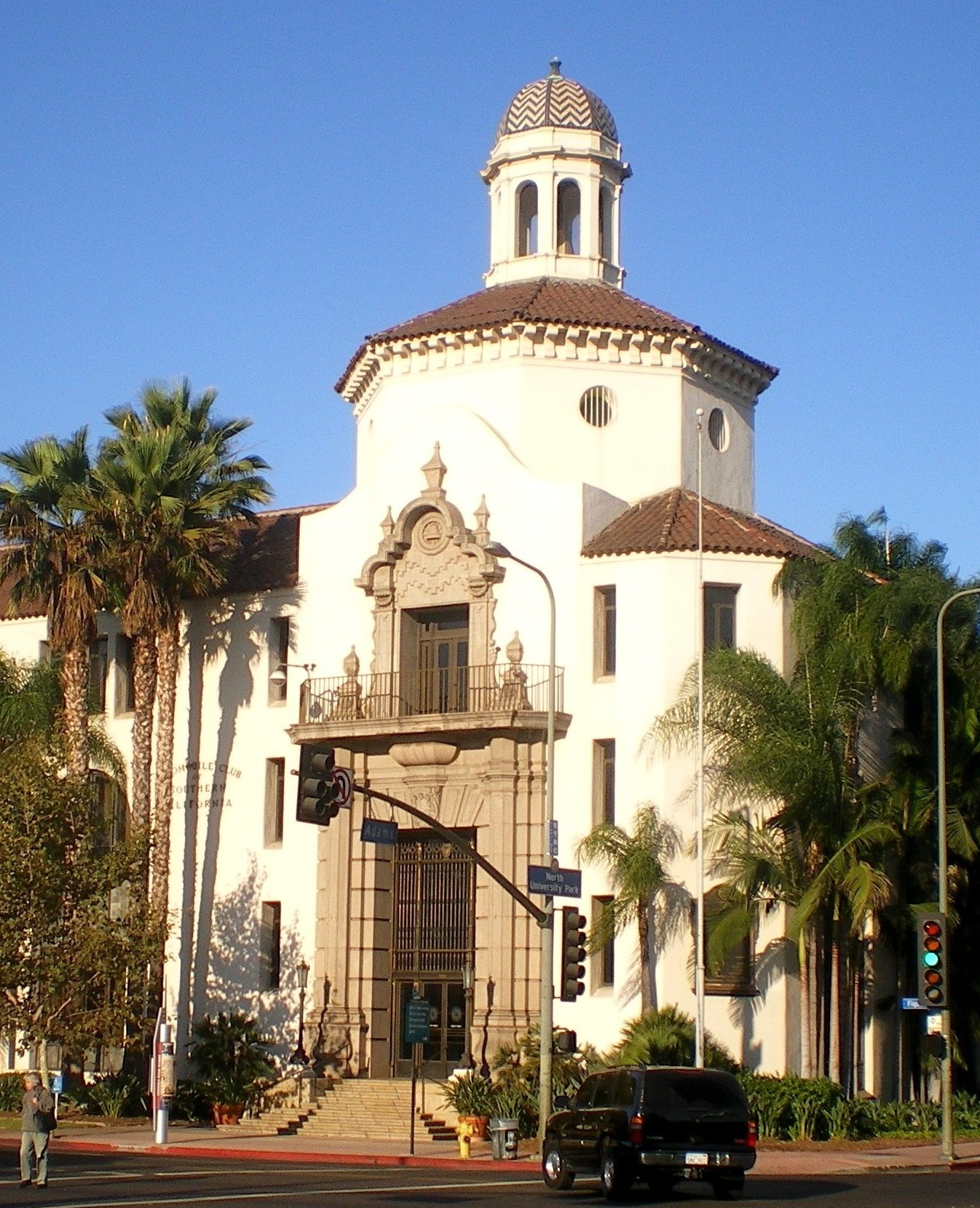
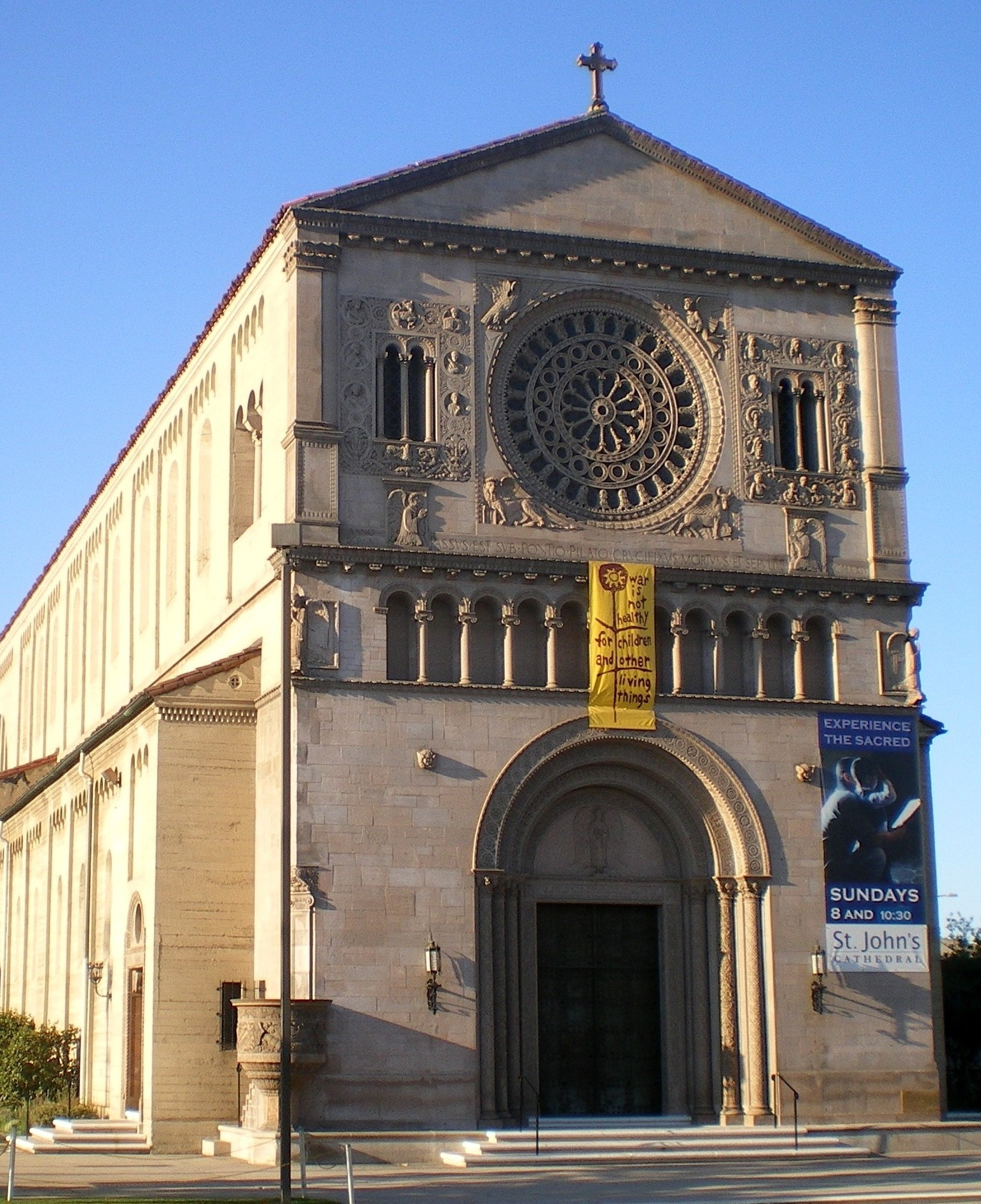
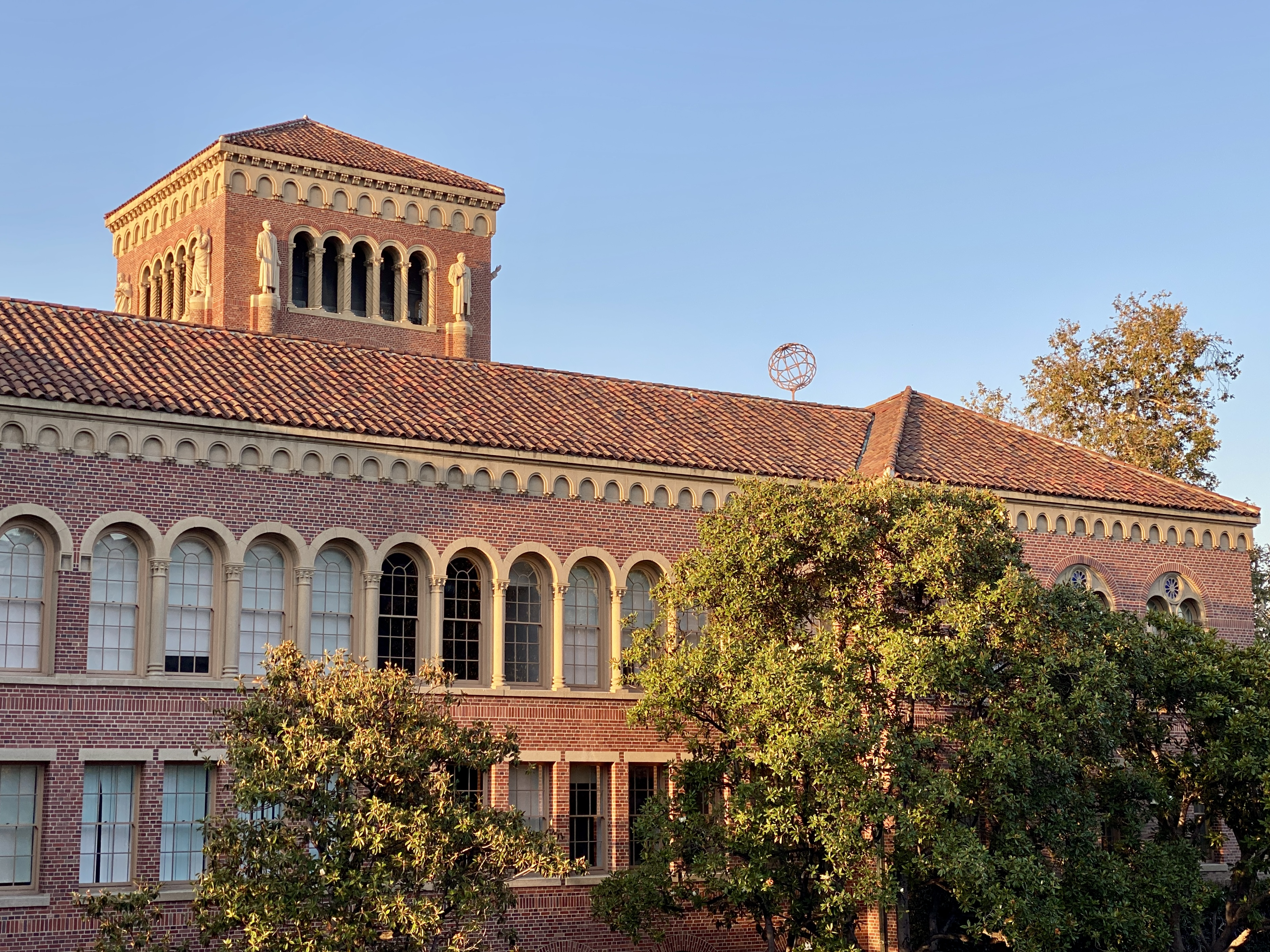
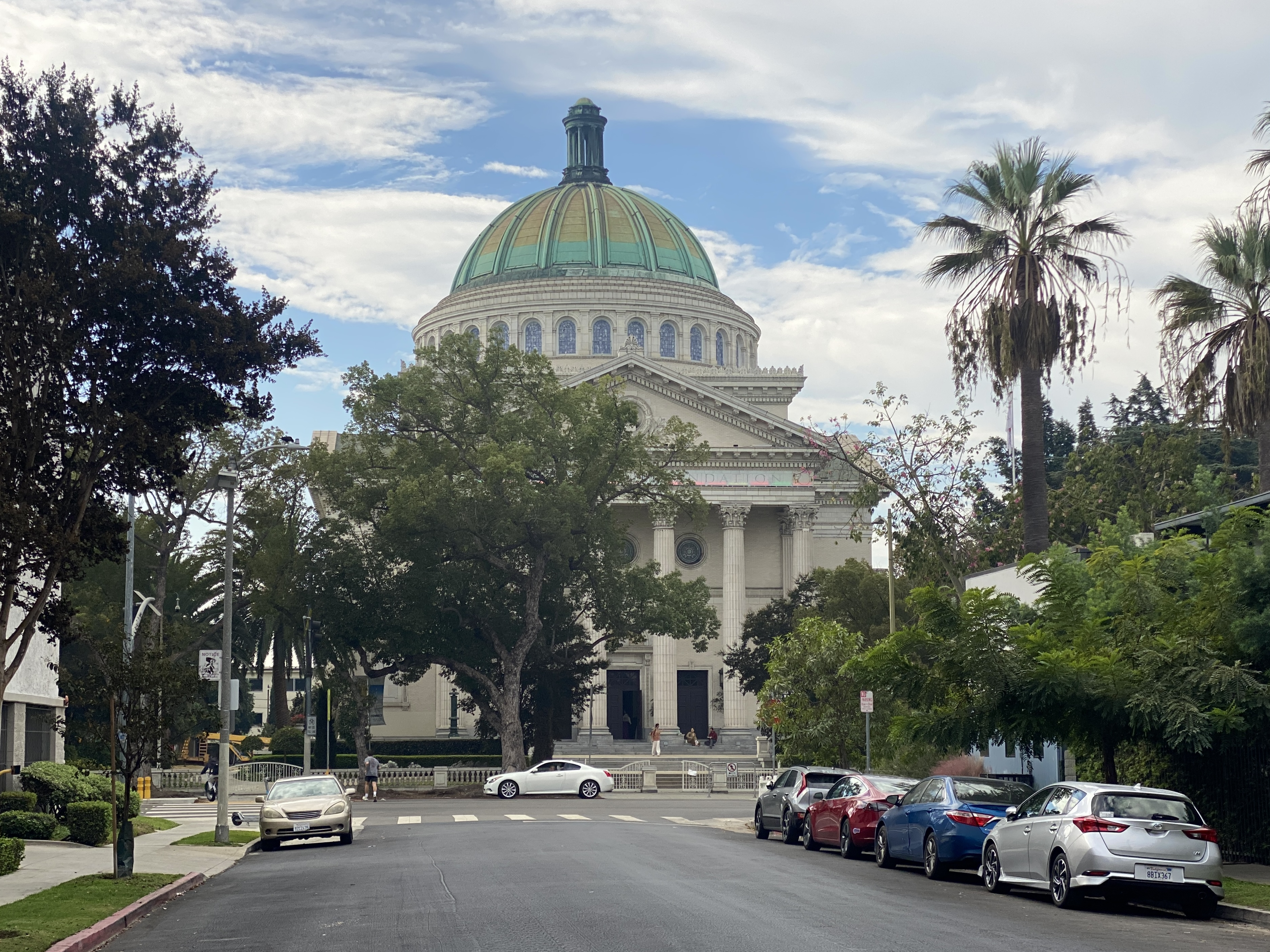
- Top: St. Vincent de Paul Church (left), Automobile Club of Southern California (middle), St. John's Cathedral (right); bottom: Bovard Auditorium in the USC campus (left) and Second Church of Christ, Scientist

- Location within South Los Angeles
- Coordinates: 34°01′40″N 118°17′00″W
- Country: United States
- State: California
- County: Los Angeles
- Time zone: Pacific
- zip: 90007 (north of Jefferson), 90089 (USC campus)
- Area code: 323

University Park is a 1.17 square miles (3.0 km^{2}) neighborhood in the South Los Angeles region of Los Angeles, California. The area includes the University of Southern California (USC), and the residential neighborhoods located immediately north of the campus: North University Park, Chester Place and St. James Park.

The area contains two historic districts that are both on the National Register of Historic Places: The North University Park Historic District and the Menlo Avenue–West Twenty-ninth Street Historic District.

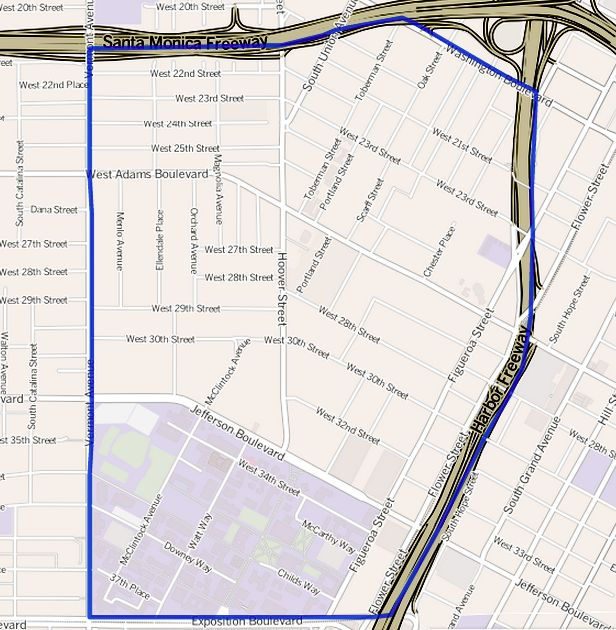
University Park as outlined by the Los Angeles Times. The University of Southern California is in the lower left corner.

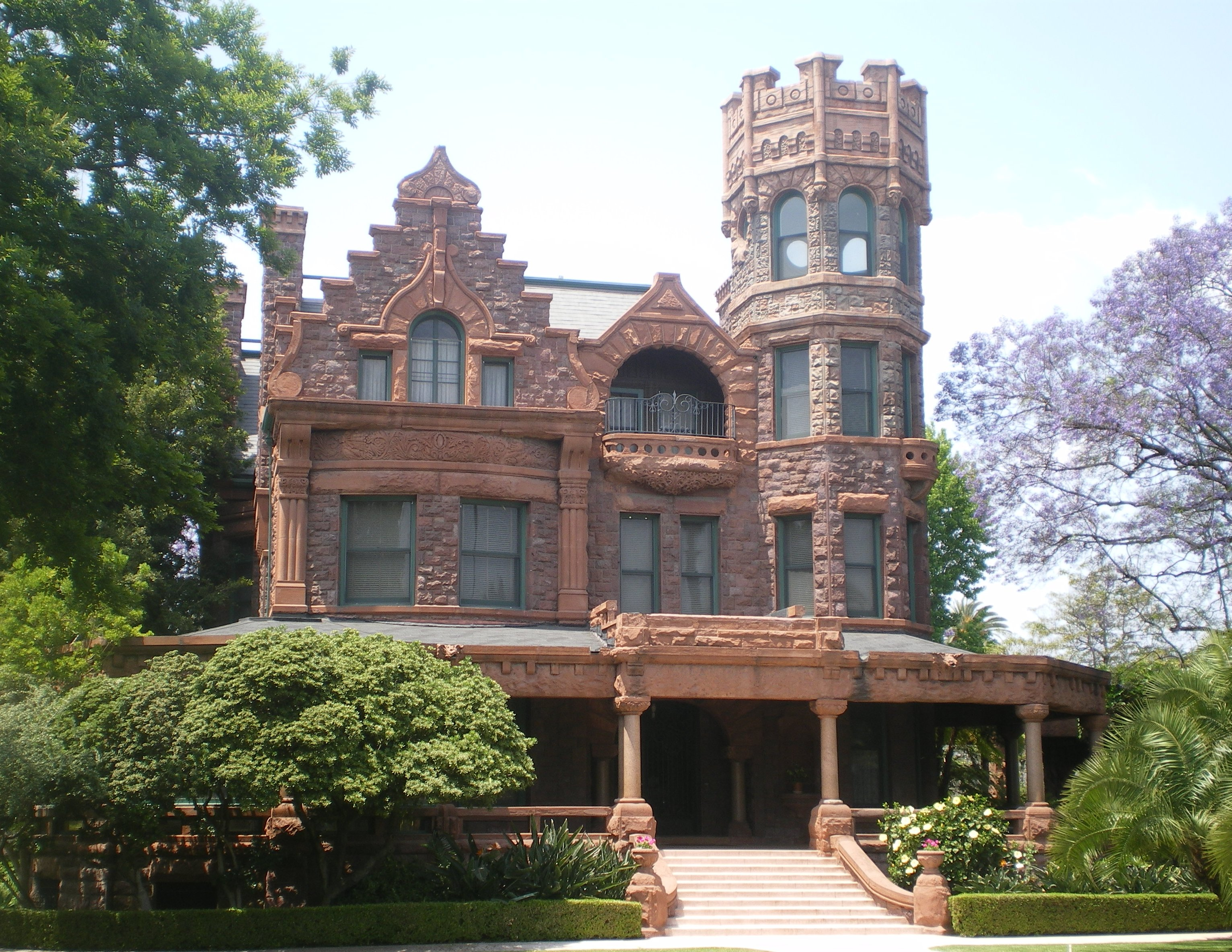
Stimson House, 2421 South Figueroa Street

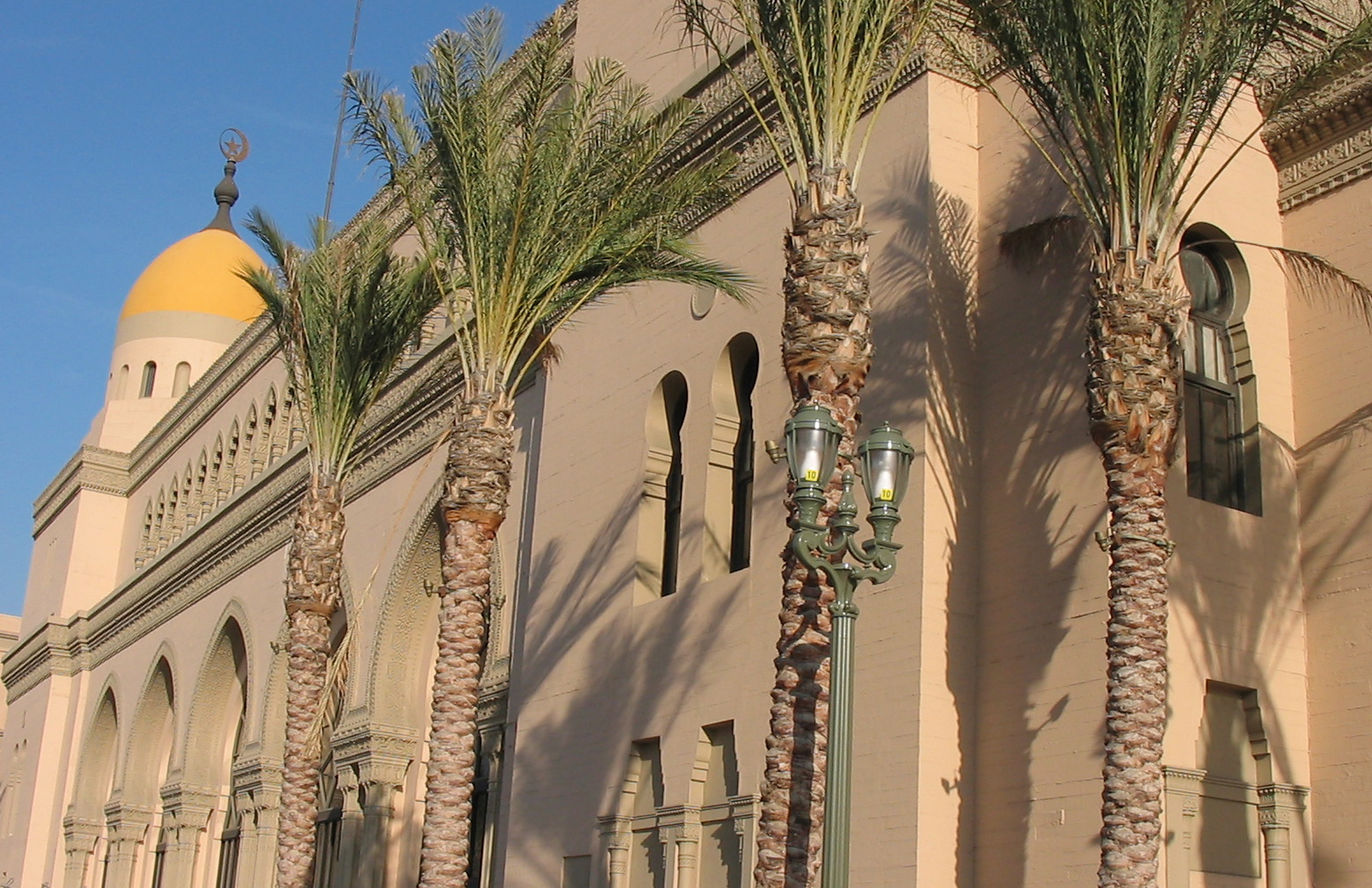
Shrine Auditorium 625 West Jefferson Boulevard

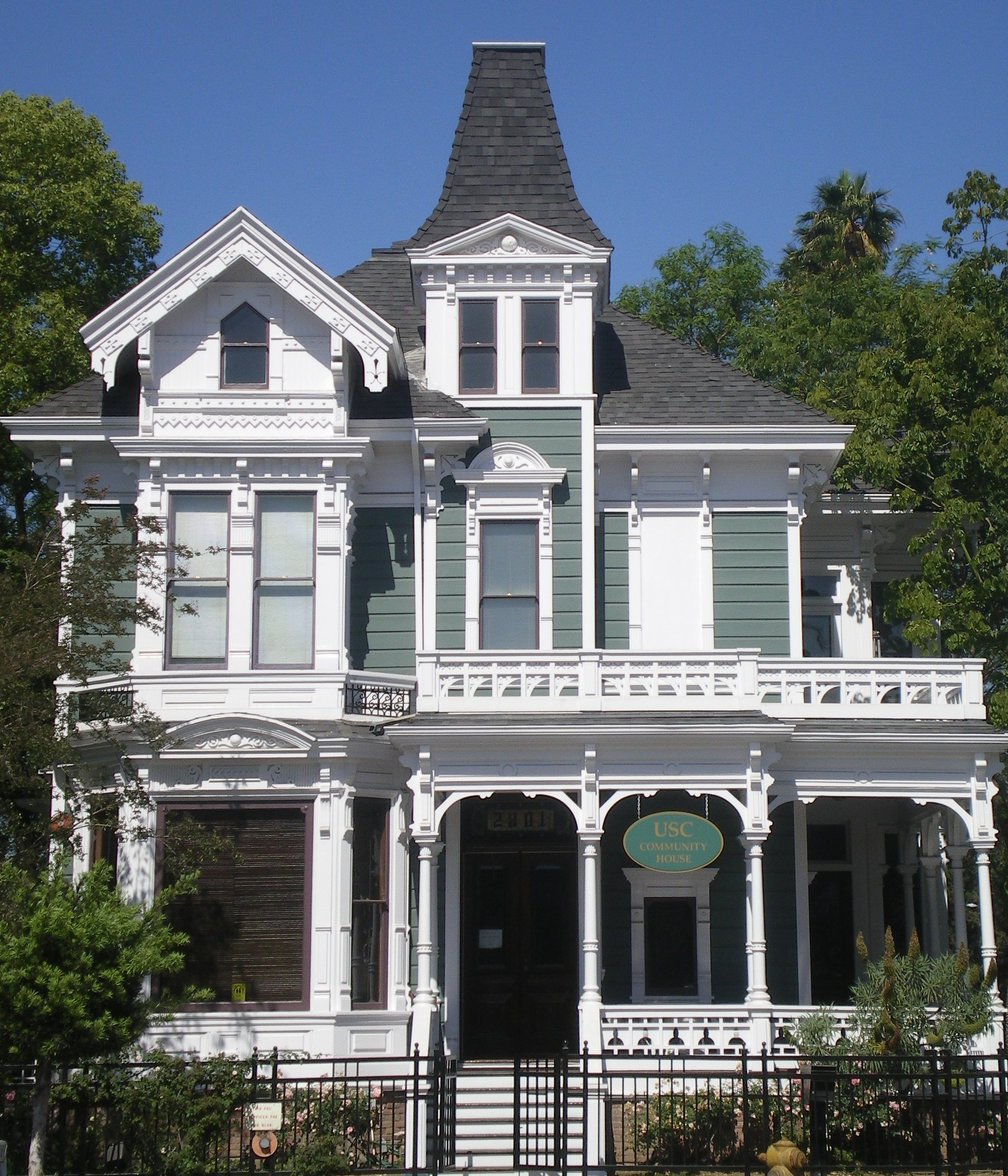
Forthmann House, 2801 South Hoover Street

== History ==
Charles Epting, author of the book "University Park", states:

"The story of USC is the story of University Park in general, showing how a neighborhood and an educational institution can develop hand-in-hand.

After the founding of the USC, the North University Park neighborhood was developed thanks to an influx of wealthy citizens.

Within North University Park, there are two historic districts on the National Register of Historic Places: The North University Park Historic District and the Menlo Avenue–West Twenty-ninth Street Historic District.

== Geography ==
Located in the West Adams district, University Park contains the University of Southern California (USC) on the south and the residential neighborhoods of North University Park, Chester Place and St. James Park on the north.

The neighborhood's street boundaries are the Santa Monica Freeway on the north, Washington Boulevard on the northeast, Vermont Avenue on the west, the Harbor Freeway on the east, and Exposition Boulevard on the south.

== Demographics ==
=== 2000 ===
A total of 23,596 people lived in University Park's 1.17 square miles, according to the 2000 U.S. census—averaging 20,217 people per square mile, among the highest population densities in the city as a whole. The median age was 23, considered young when compared to the city as a whole. The percentage of residents aged 19 to 34 was among the county's highest.

The $16,533 median household income in 2008 dollars was considered low for the city and county. The percentage of households earning $20,000 or less (56.6%) was the second-largest in Los Angeles County, outplaced only by Downtown Los Angeles. The average household size of 2.7 people was average for the city. Renters occupied 92.2% of the housing units, and homeowners occupied the rest.

In 2000 there were 590 families headed by single parents, or 20.3%, a rate that was high for the county and the city. The percentages of never-married women (61.5) and never-married men (67.2) were among the county's highest.

In the same year there were 198 military veterans, or 1% of the population, considered low when compared to the city and county as a whole.

=== 2008 ===
Population was estimated at 25,181 in 2008.

== Education ==
=== Secondary and primary ===
The following public schools are operated by the Los Angeles Unified School District:

- New Designs Charter School— 2303 South Figueroa Way, 1342 West Adams Blvd
- Alliance Richard Merkin Middle School - 2023 Union Avenue
- Downtown Value School - 950 West Washington Boulevard
- Norwood Street Elementary School - 2020 Oak Street
- Frank Lanterman School - 2328 Saint James Place
- Thirty-Second Street USC Performing Arts - 822 West 32nd Street

=== Post-secondary ===
- University of Southern California
- Mount St. Mary's University, Doheny Campus
- Hebrew Union College

== Recreation and parks ==
- Hoover Recreation Center - 1010 West 25th Street. The parkincludes an auditorium equipped with a studio floor and stage, three meeting rooms, kitchen, private outdoor courtyard with children's play area, basketball courts, outdoor fitness equipment, walking/running paths, picnic tables and barbecue pits.
- St. James Park - Adams Boulevard and Severance Street

== Landmarks and attractions ==
- The Shrine Auditorium - 665 W. Jefferson Blvd.
- University Village - 3201 S. Hoover.
- St. John's Cathedral - 514 W. Adams Blvd. It is the Diocesan Cathedral for the Episcopal Diocese of Los Angeles.

== Transportation ==
The Metro E Line serves the neighborhood, with stations at 23rd Street, Jefferson Blvd./USC, Exposition Park/USC and Exposition Blvd./Vermont Avenue.

== Notable residents ==
- Newell Mathews (c.1833–1907), 19th Century businessman and member of the Los Angeles Common Council
- Frank Sabichi (1842–1900), attorney, land developer, member of the Common Council
- Ygnacio Sepulveda (1842–1916), Superior Court judge, 2639 Monmouth Avenue
