= Miller and Herriott House =

Historic house in California, United States

- U.S. National Register of Historic Places
- Los Angeles Historic-Cultural Monument
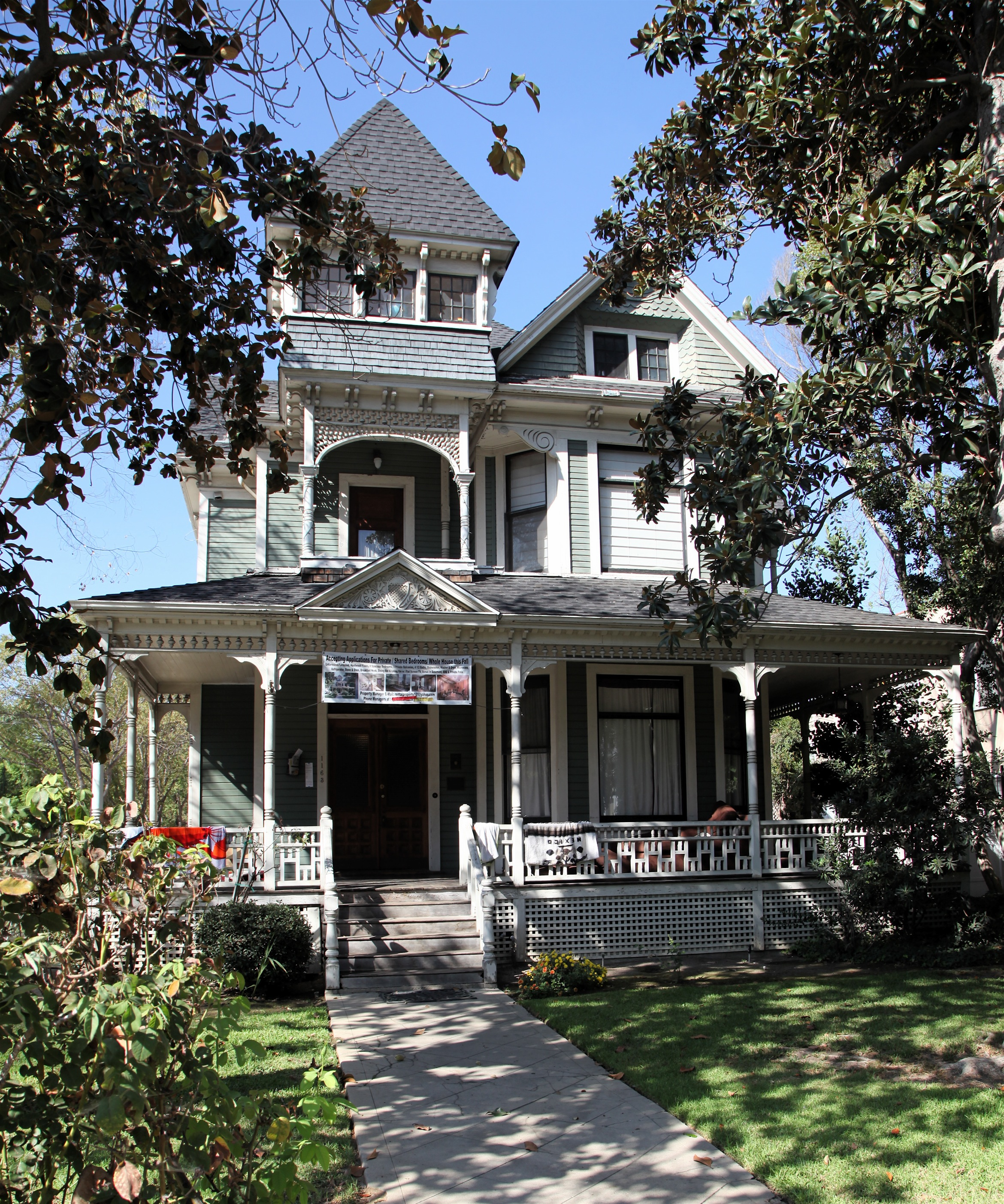
- Miller and Herriott House (2014)

- Location within the Los Angeles metropolitan area Location within California Location within the United States
- Location: 1163 W. 27th Street, North University Park, Los Angeles, California
- Coordinates: 34°1′50″N 118°17′7″W
- Built: 1890
- Architect: Joseph Cather Newsom
- Architectural style: Queen Anne-Stick-Eastlake
- NRHP reference No.: 79000486
- LAHCM No.: 242

Significant dates
- Added to NRHP: November 16, 1979
- Designated LAHCM: April 9, 1981

The Miller and Herriott House, also known as the Miller and Herriott Tract House, is a historic Victorian house in the North University Park section of Los Angeles, California. Built in 1890, the house is considered to be a combination of Stick and Eastlake styles. The identity of the architect is not known, though some have attributed the design to Joseph Cather Newsom. A short distance from the University of Southern California campus, the house is now used primarily for student housing.

== History ==
The house was built as part of the Harper Tract developed by Miller & Herriott. In 1888, the two developers bought a 25-acre (100,000 m^{2}) piece of land west of Hoover Street, between the prestigious West Adams district to the north and the nascent University of Southern California to the south. They subdivided the land into 98 lots, building "substantial and tasty residences, costing not less than $3000 each." Considered a "suburb" at the time, the Los Angeles Times correctly predicted: "The whole city is growing rapidly to the southwest, and it will not be long before it will be a misnomer to call that section a suburb." The Miller and Herriott House is the oldest surviving structure in the Harper Tract.

By 1980, the house had gone through 27 owners. It was restored in the early 1980s, though the original stained glass in the front door transom was removed for use in a restaurant near Disneyland. After touring the house in 1980, Los Angeles Times columnist Jack Smith called it "tall and lacy, with a plush, ornate and comfortably cluttered interior in Victorian style." Commenting on the removal of the stained glass to an Orange County restaurant, Smith noted: "There was new glass in its place, but it looked like that wooden leg must have looked on Sara Bernhardt."

The exterior was used in 2012 in the fifth episode "Open House of Horrors" of the fourth season of the American sitcom Modern Family, while the interior was shot in the Holmes-Shannon House in Los Angeles.

== Landmark ==
The house was listed on the National Register of Historic Places in 1979 and designated as a Historic Cultural Monument (HCM #242) by the Los Angeles Cultural Heritage Commission in 1981. It is also part of the North University Park Historic District.

== See also ==
- List of Registered Historic Places in Los Angeles
- List of Los Angeles Historic-Cultural Monuments in South Los Angeles
