= Banco Popular =

Banco Popular or Banco Popolare may refer to:

- Popular, Inc., a bank based in Puerto Rico doing business as Banco Popular in Puerto Rico and the Virgin Islands and Popular Bank in the United States
- Banco Popular Español, a defunct bank based in Spain
- Banco Popular Dominicano, a bank based in the Dominican Republic
- Banco Popular, a bank based in Tegucigalpa, Honduras
- Herman W. Hellman Building, a historic building in Los Angeles that is also known as Banco Popular

== See also ==
- Banco Popolare, the Italian bank based in Verona
  - Banco Popolare Siciliano, a subsidiary
  - Banco Popolare Sassari, an Italian professional basketball club sponsored by the bank
