= Cockins House =

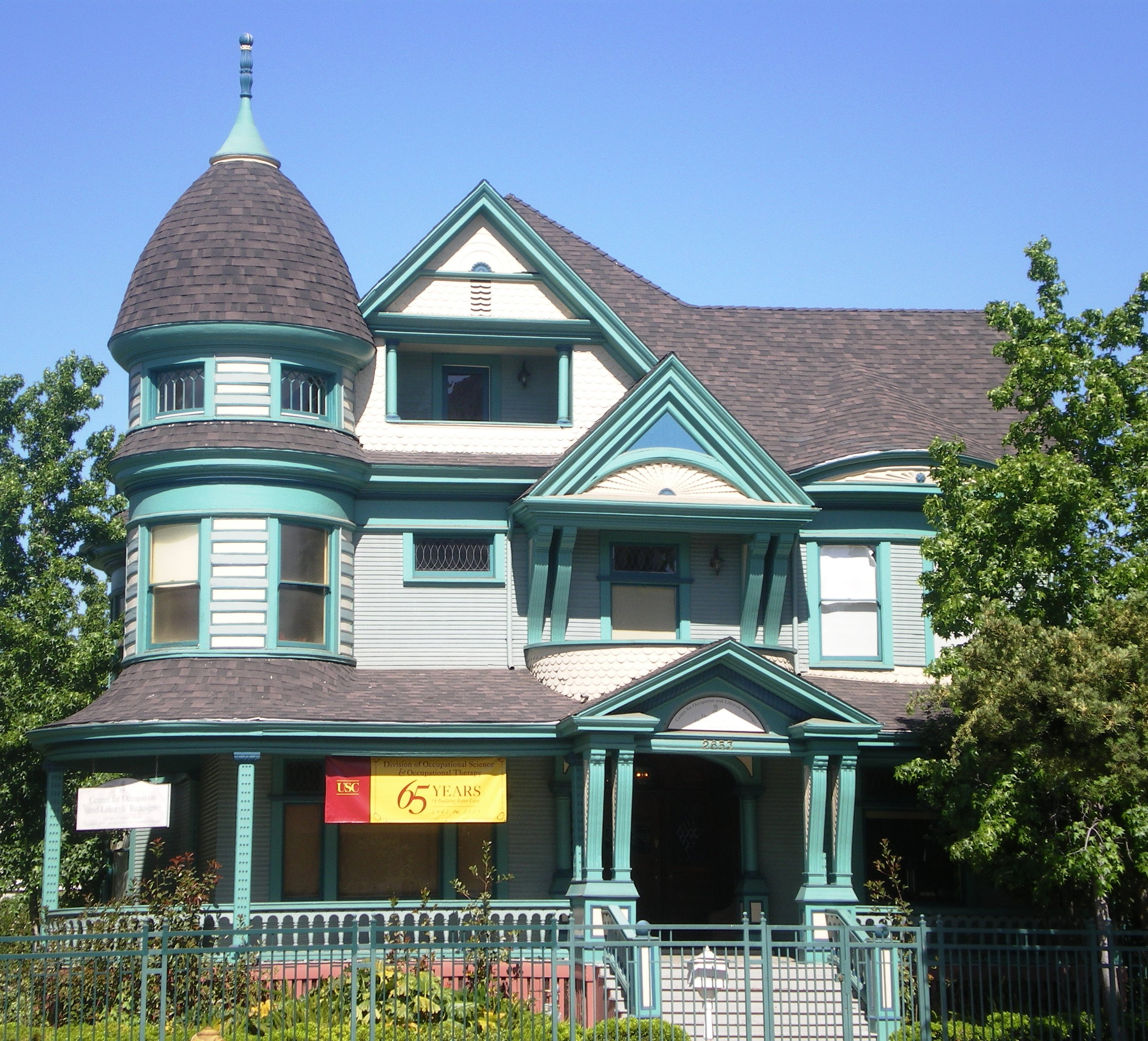
Front of the Cockins House

The Cockins House is a historic home located at 2653 S. Hoover St., Los Angeles. It is a contributing property in the North University Park Historic District and was also declared Los Angeles Historic-Cultural Monument No. 519.

== History ==
The Cockins House was designed and constructed in 1894 by James H. Bradbeer and Walter Ferris. It is 5,570 sq. ft. and built in the Queen Anne style. It was created for William and Sarah Cockins who occupied the home until 1903. Next, Thomas P. Newton resided at the house, staying until 1908. The house was converted to a duplex in 1911, and it was rumored Charlie Chaplin stayed at the home in 1913, alongside USC students. Over time, the structure fell into disrepair. Concerned neighbors nominated it for historic status; it became Los Angeles Historic-Cultural Monument No. 519 on Feb. 1, 1991. The University of Southern California acquired the property and refurbished it, opening the Center for Occupation and Lifestyle Redesign in it in 1999.
