= Alfred Rosenheim =

American architect

Alfred Faist Rosenheim
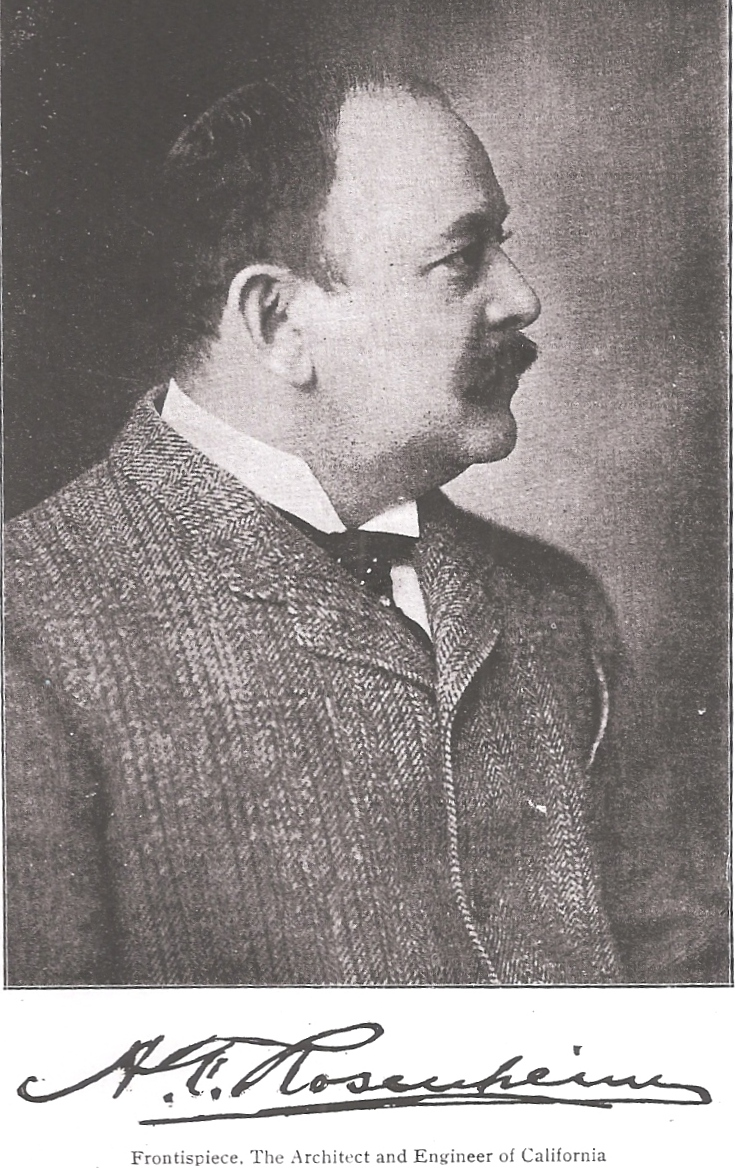
- Born: June 10, 1859; St. Louis, Missouri, U.S.
- Died: September 9, 1943 (aged 84); Los Angeles, California, U.S.
- Occupation: Architect
- Buildings: Herman W. Hellman Building; Second Church of Christ, Scientist; Eugene W. Britt House; Doheny House

Alfred Faist Rosenheim, F.A.I.A. (June 10, 1859 – September 9, 1943) was an American architect. A Fellow of the American Institute of Architects, he was one of the leading architects in Los Angeles in the early part of the 20th century. His major works include the Herman W. Hellman Building, Hamburger's Department Store, Second Church of Christ, Scientist, and the Eugene W. Britt House.

== Education and early career ==
Rosenheim was born in St. Louis to a Jewish family in St. Louis, Missouri, the son of immigrants from Germany. After attending public schools in St. Louis, he studied in Frankfurt am Main, Germany from 1872 to 1875. When he returned from Germany, Rosenheim was a student at Washington University in St. Louis from 1876 to 1879. He next attended the Massachusetts Institute of Technology, from 1879 to 1881.

Rosenheim began his career as a draftsman working for Charles K. Ramsay of Boston from 1881 to 1883. In early 1884, he joined the practice of Major Francis D. Lee, then the leading architect in St. Louis. When Major Lee died in 1885, Rosenheim took over the practice. In 1894, he formed a partnership with T. C. Link and William B. Ittner that lasted until 1897. From 1897 to 1899, he worked in a partnership with his younger brother, Samuel F. Rosenheim, with Alfred working in Boston and Samuel in St. Louis. During this time, the Rosenheim firm designed Farragut Chambers, a ten-story apartment house in Washington, D.C., and various structures in Boston and Worcester, Massachusetts. In 1899, Rosenheim returned to St. Louis, where he remained until 1903.

== Works ==
=== Hellman Building ===
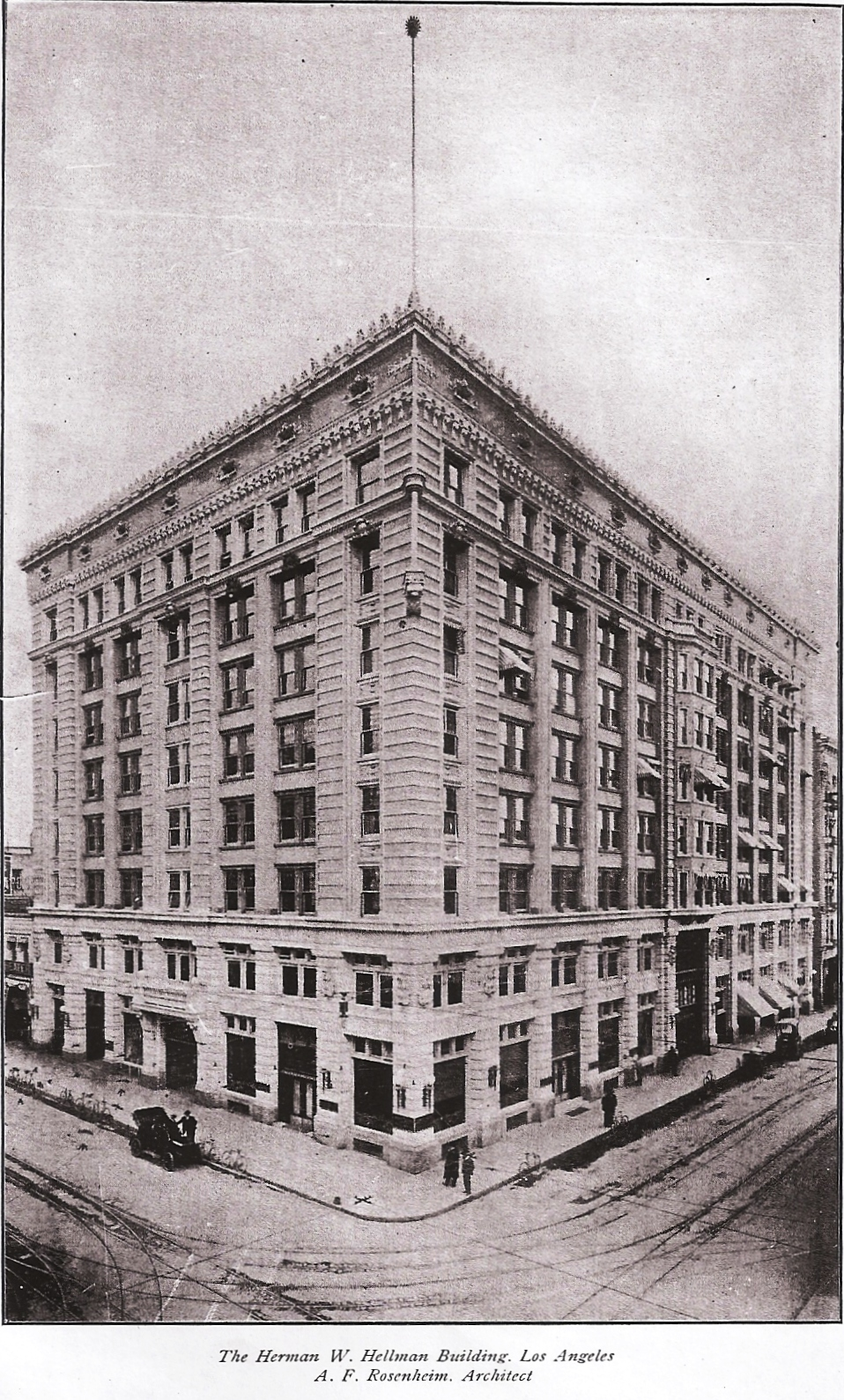
Herman W. Hellman Building

In 1902, Rosenheim received a commission to design the Herman W. Hellman Building, which was to be the largest steel-frame building in Los Angeles. He moved to Los Angeles in February 1903 to personally oversee its construction, which continued until November 1904. The impressive eight-story structure located in the heart of the city's new financial district established Rosenheim's reputation in the young city. The Architect and Engineer of California wrote that the building "universally is considered the finest architectural monument in Los Angeles," built at an unprecedented cost of $1 million. The structure was built with a full steel skeleton frame, concrete floors and metal partitions.

=== Hamburger's ===
Following his work on the Hellman Building, Rosenheim was hired by A. Hamburger & Sons Co., to design and oversee the construction of their gigantic Hamburger Department Store, a five-story building at the corner of Broadway and Eighth Street. Hamburger's later became the downtown May Co. Building, the largest department store in the Western United States when it opened. Additional commissions followed in Los Angeles, where Rosenheim built his practice and remained for the rest of his life.

=== Second Church of Christ, Scientist ===
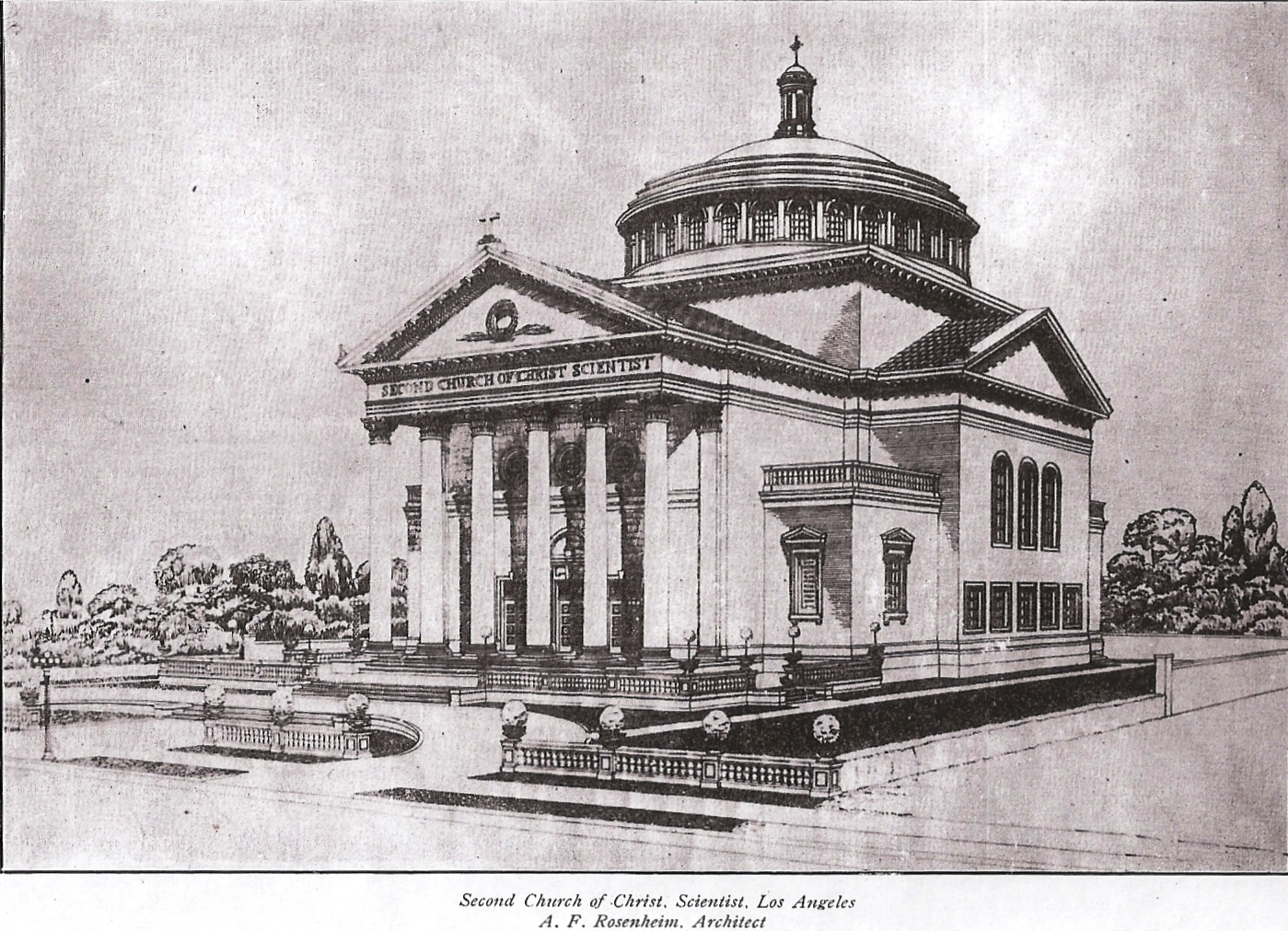
Second Church of Christ, Scientist

Another landmark Los Angeles building designed by Rosenheim is the Second Church of Christ, Scientist, a large domed church built in 1907 in the West Adams district.

=== Other works ===
He also designed Clune's Broadway Theater, the Majestic Theater (on the east side of Broadway between Sixth and Seventh Streets), the Chapman block (at the southeast corner of Fifth and Los Angeles streets), and the buildings occupied by the Farmers & Merchants Bank and the Security-First National Trust and Savings Bank.

Rosenheim also designed many palatial homes for the city's wealthy, including a home for Edward L. Doheny in Beverly Hills, the Reeves residence in West Adams, the Eugene W. Britt House in West Adams, and the Judson C. Rives mansion in Westchester Place. The brick mansion he designed as his own residence in 1910, located at 1120 Westchester Place, was considered "one of the finest homes in Los Angeles."

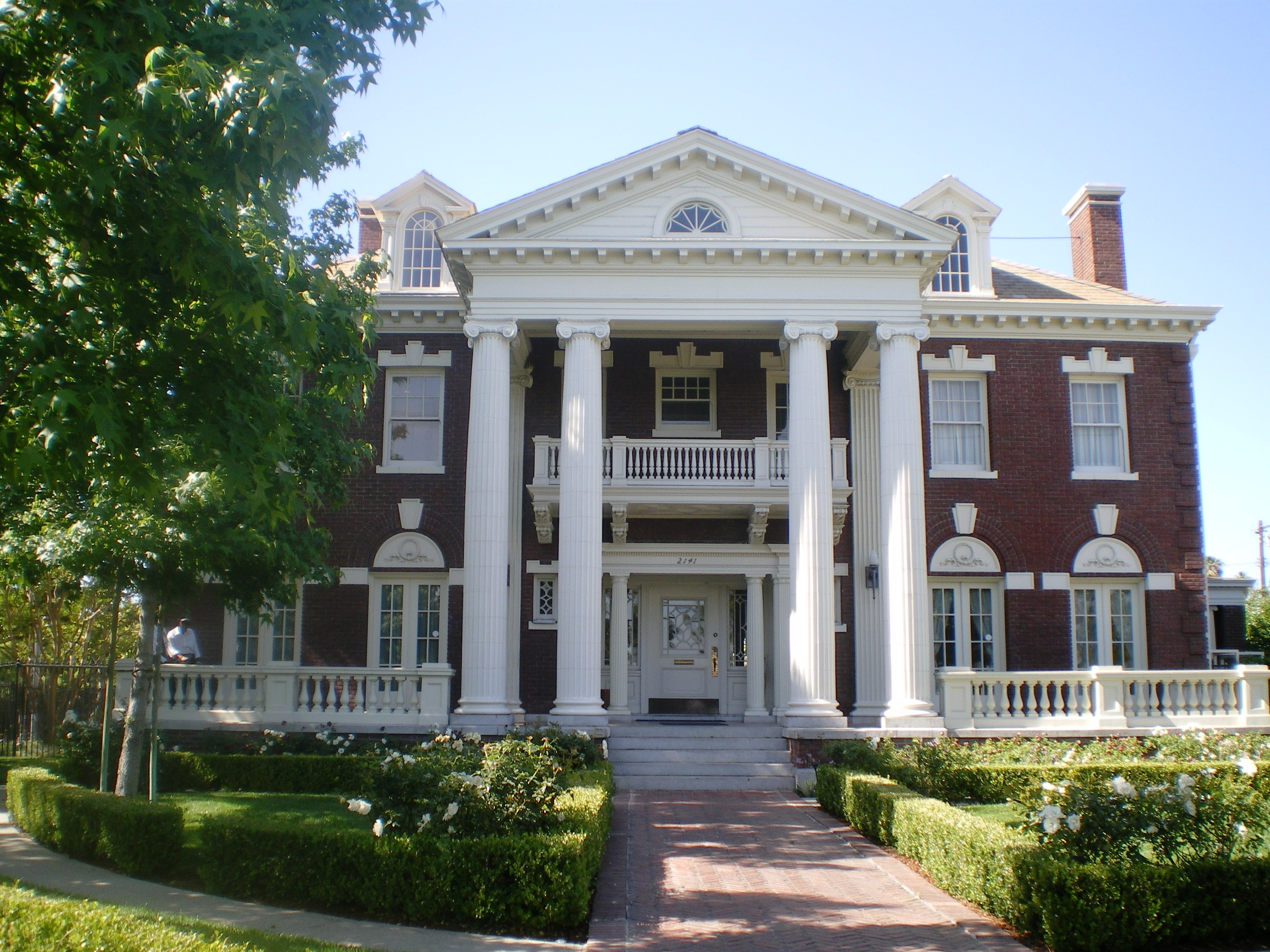
Eugene W. Britt House

Rosenheim's last major commission was the Hollenbeck Junior High School in 1937. The Hollenbeck school was a departure for Rosenheim, considered "modern" by many at the time. Rosenheim was reluctant to acknowledge the school as modern and wrote the following in the April 1939 issue of The Architect and Engineer:

"I do not consider the buildings particularly 'modern' although the administration and assembly hall units may possess something akin to the so-called 'contemporary' style. Personally, I do not hesitate to express the fervent hope that 'modernistic' architecture is not a permanent trend. I have a strong feeling that the bulk of modern work we see the country over has very little claim to architectural beauty. In fact I am inclined to doubt whether it can strictly be regarded as architecture. ... But whatever one chooses to call the style of my Hollenbeck School, it seemed to appeal to the Board of Education and its architect."

== Arts Commission scandal and later life ==
Rosenheim became a Fellow of the A.I.A. in 1889 and served as the President of its Southern California chapter. After several years serving as the Secretary of the Los Angeles Municipal Arts Commission, Rosenheim was removed following a widely publicized scandal in 1921. After the commission rejected a proposal by a jeweler to erect an ornamental clock on the sidewalk, Rosenheim offered, for a fee of $250, to prepare drawings that he could "safely guarantee" would be approved by the commission. The Rosenheim-drafted plans were then approved at a special meeting of the commission held in Rosenheim's office on a Saturday morning. Rosenheim insisted he had done nothing improper, but the City Council unanimously voted to remove him, and the local branch of the American Institute of Architects recommended a term of suspension from its ranks.

Rosenheim died of heart disease at California Hospital in 1943 at age 84. He was survived by his wife, Ruth.
