= Eugene W. Britt House =

Historic house in California, United States

- U.S. National Register of Historic Places
- Los Angeles Historic-Cultural Monument
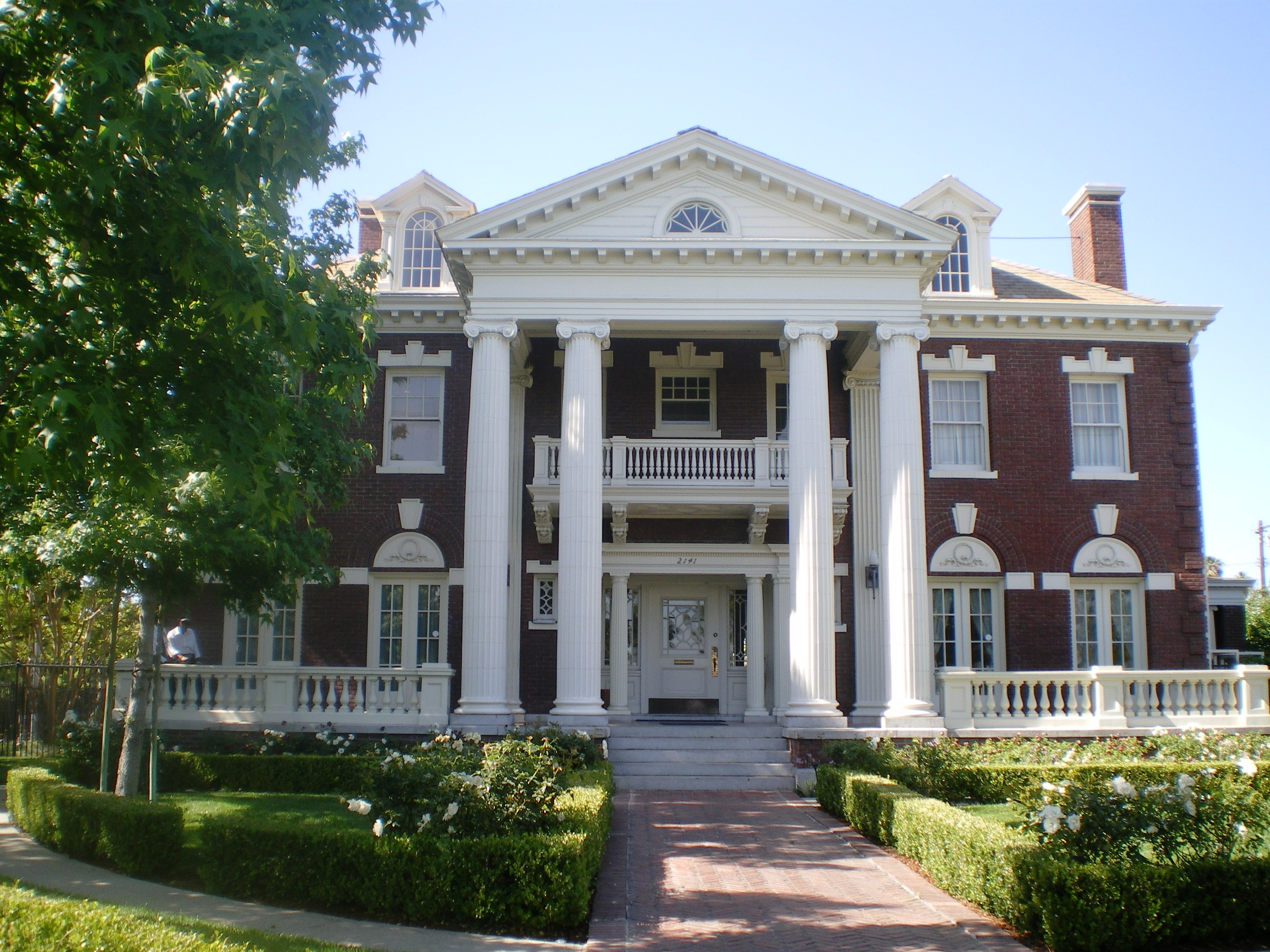
- Eugene Britt House, 2008

- Location within the Los Angeles metropolitan area Location within California Location within the United States
- Location: 2141 W. Adams Blvd., West Adams, Los Angeles
- Coordinates: 34°1′59″N 118°18′44″W
- Built: 1910
- Architect: Alfred Rosenheim
- Architectural style: Georgian Revival-Colonial Revival
- NRHP reference No.: 79000483
- LAHCM No.: 197

Significant dates
- Added to NRHP: May 17, 1979
- Designated LAHCM: August 23, 1978

Eugene W. Britt House is a three-story, red-brick Georgian Revival-Colonial Revival mansion built in 1910 in Los Angeles, California. It is in the West Adams Terrace neighborhood within the West Adams district. In 1984, it was converted into a sports museum housing the collection of the Helms Athletic Foundation. Since 1986, it has been the headquarters of the LA84 Foundation and the site of the LA84 Foundation Sports Library — the world's premier sports library.

== Early years ==
The house was designed by architect Alfred Faist Rosenheim and built in 1910 for attorney Eugene W. Britt.

== Historic designations ==
In the late 1970s, the owner obtained a demolition permit for the house, but the Los Angeles Cultural Heritage Commission stepped in, designating the house and gardens as a Historic-Cultural Monument (HCM #197) on August 23, 1978. The house was also listed on the National Register of Historic Places in May 1979. However, in September 1980, the owner of the house petitioned the Los Angeles City Council to remove its designation as a historic monument, arguing that a purchaser could not be found willing to buy subject to the historic restrictions. The City Council voted 12–1 to remove the historic monument designation.

== Sports museum ==
The house was saved in the early 1980s through the efforts of Peter Ueberroth, president of the Los Angeles Olympic Organizing Committee, and his wife, Ginny Ueberroth. Fifty years earlier, Los Angeles businessman Paul Helms had begun building a large collection of rare sports memorabilia (part of the Helms Athletic Foundation) that was displayed over the years at a downtown Los Angeles office building and later at the Helms Bakery in Culver City. In 1970, when Helms Bakery went out of business, United Savings & Loan took over sponsorship of the collection, but the bank's successor dropped its sponsorship in 1981. At that time, the collection was moved to a warehouse and plans were made to break up the collection. Peter and Ginny Ueberroth stepped in to keep the collection intact, funding the foundation out of their own pockets until First Interstate Bank agreed in 1982 to act as the sponsor.

Ueberroth and First Interstate acquired the Britt House as a home for the collection. The house had deteriorated and was renovated at a cost of $2 million. In 1984, the Britt House opened to the public as a sports museum in time for the 1984 Summer Olympic Games which opened at the nearby Los Angeles Memorial Coliseum. The collection displayed at the Britt House had 50,000 items, including a bat used by Ty Cobb, boxing gloves used by Jack Dempsey, baseball uniforms of Babe Ruth and Lou Gehrig, bronzed track shoes used by Jesse Owens, size 24 shoes worn by boxer Primo Carnera, and the World Trophy—a trophy granted to the world's most outstanding amateur athlete starting in 1896. Fitting with the city's hosting of the Olympic games, the collection also included gold, silver and bronze medals dating back to 1896, a collection of Olympic relay torches, and the wreath placed on the head of Ralph Craig (gold medalist in the 100 and 200 metres) at the 1912 Summer Olympics.

== LA84 Foundation ==
Britt House now serves as the headquarters of the LA84 Foundation. First Interstate and Ueberroth donated the Helms collection and the Britt House and grounds to the LA84 Foundation in the summer of 1985. The LA84 Foundation is a private nonprofit institution endowed with surplus funds from the 1984 Los Angeles Olympic Games. Its mission is to serve youth through sport and to increase knowledge of sport and its impact on people's lives.

The 10,000-square-foot (930 m^{2}) Paul Ziffren Sports Resource Center was built on the Britt House grounds and dedicated in 1988. The Ziffren Center houses the LA84 Foundation Sports Library—the largest sports research library in North America and considered "the premier sports library in the world." It is a state-of-the-art research facility dedicated to the advancement of sports knowledge and scholarship. It includes approximately 40,000 printed volumes, 6,000 microform volumes, 7,000 videos, 400 periodical titles, and 90,000 photo images. Highlights of the collection include the official report of every modern Olympic Games, dozens of Olympian oral histories, the Avery Brundage Collection on microfilm, complete video sets of television coverage of the Olympic Games since 1988, minutes of early International Olympic Committee meetings, and bid documents of cities seeking to host the Olympic Games.

The Foundation also maintains a sizable collection of historic sport art and artifacts much of which was inherited from the former Helms Foundation. Among the items still on display at Britt House is the World Trophy.

== See also ==
- List of Registered Historic Places in Los Angeles
- List of Los Angeles Historic-Cultural Monuments in South Los Angeles
- LA84 Foundation
