= LA84 Foundation =

Non-profit olympic organizing committee in Los Angeles

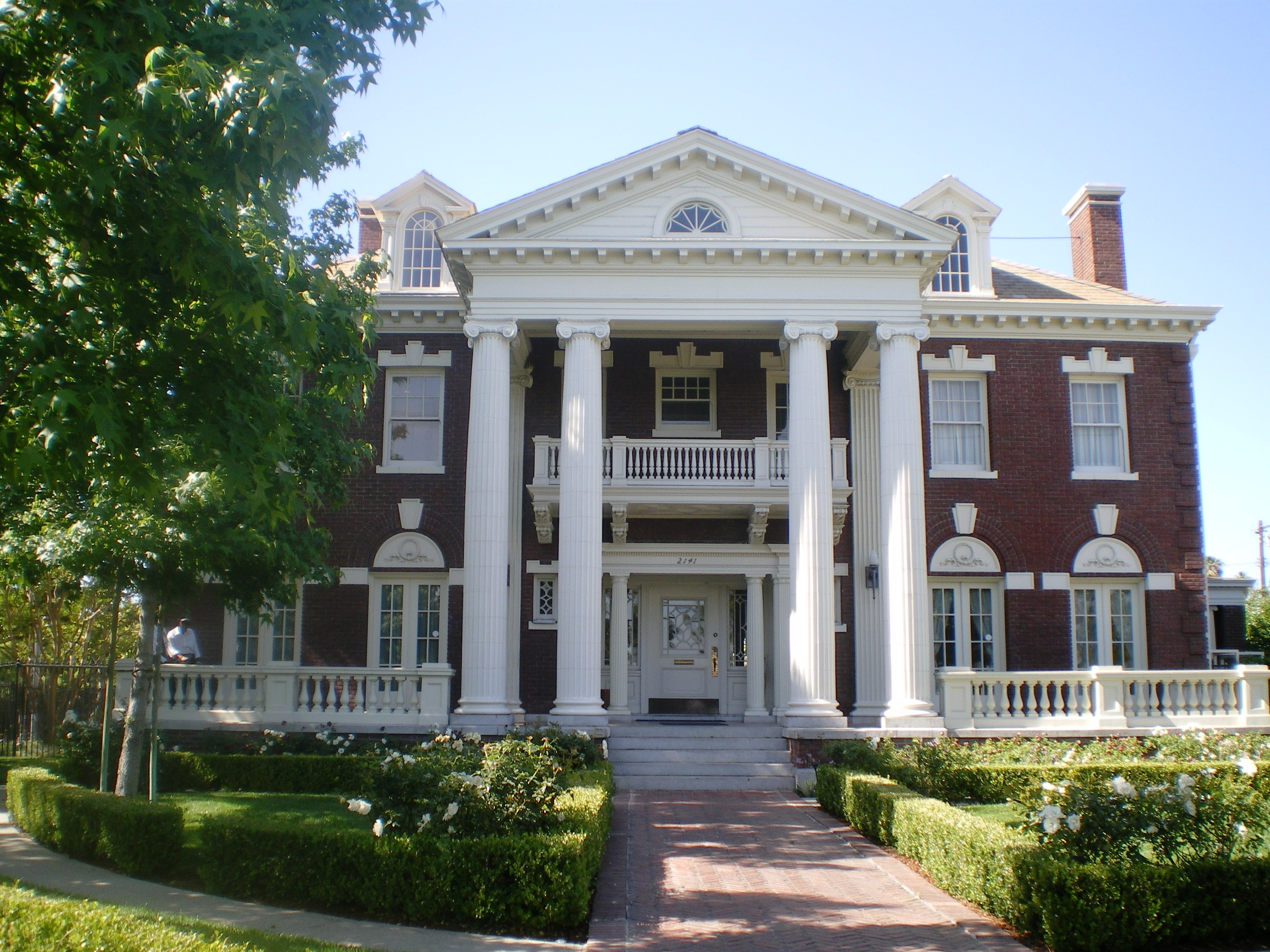
The foundation's main building

The LA84 Foundation (known until June 2007 as the Amateur Athletic Foundation of Los Angeles) is a private, nonprofit institution created by the Los Angeles Olympic Organizing Committee to manage Southern California's endowment from the 1984 Olympic Games. Under an agreement made in 1979, 40 percent of any surplus was to stay in Southern California, with the other 60 percent going to the United States Olympic Committee. The total surplus was $232.5 million. Southern California's share was approximately $93 million.

The LA84 Foundation's mission is to promote and expand youth sports opportunities in Southern California and to increase knowledge of sport and its impact on people's lives. Since inception, the Foundation has invested more than $225 million in Southern California by awarding grants to youth sports organizations, initiating sports and coaching education programs, and operating the world's premier sports library.

Grants are awarded to organizations that provide on-going, structured youth sports programs combining the essential elements of teaching, learning and competition. The Foundation makes grants in the eight southernmost counties of California (Imperial, Los Angeles, Orange, Riverside, San Bernardino, San Diego, Santa Barbara and Ventura). Youth organizations in the Los Angeles area receive priority. The LA84 Foundation has made grants to more than 1,100 Southern California organizations since 1985.

The LA84 Foundation has initiated programs to meet the youth sports needs of Southern California and to create models that can be applied elsewhere. These include the LA84 Foundation Coaching Education Program as well as large-scale sports programs such as Summer Swim and Run 4 Fun, which serve nearly 20,000 children and teenagers each year.

The Foundation's headquarters is the historic Eugene W. Britt House, a Registered Historic Place located at 2141 West Adams Boulevard in the West Adams Terrace neighborhood within the West Adams district of Los Angeles. It was formerly a sports museum that featured the Helms Athletic Foundation's collection of sports books, film, photographs and memorabilia. First Interstate Bank and the Peter and Ginny Ueberroth Foundation donated the Helms Collection, house and grounds to the LA84 Foundation in the summer of 1985.

The Paul Ziffren Sports Resource Center houses the world's premier sports library. The library maintains an extensive collection of books, periodicals, photograph and moving footage, with a special emphasis on the Olympic Games. The traditional library has been supplemented by the development of an extensive electronic collection of 100,000 PDFs including scholarly publications, popular magazine and primary historical documents available at no cost on the LA84 Foundation website.

The LA84 Foundation also hosts conferences and sponsors research on a variety of sport topics. The LA84 Foundations practical knowledge, acquired through years of direct involvement in youth sports, combined with its wide range of education services enables the Foundation to serve as a leading forum for the exchange of ideas and exploration of issues in sport.

In June 2007, the Foundation adopted the name LA84 Foundation to establish a unique identity and honor the spirit of the 1984 Olympic Games, which created the Foundation's endowment.

The swimming stadium used for the 1932 Olympic Games has been renamed the LA84 Foundation/John C. Argue Swim Stadium. Argue was instrumental in bringing the 1984 Olympic Games to Los Angeles. He later served as chair of the LA84 Foundation.

The foundation also played a vital role on Los Angeles' bid to host the 2028 Summer Olympics, which marks the third time the city hosted the quadrennial games.
