= North University Park Historic District =

Historic district in California, United States

- U.S. National Register of Historic Places
- U.S. Historic district
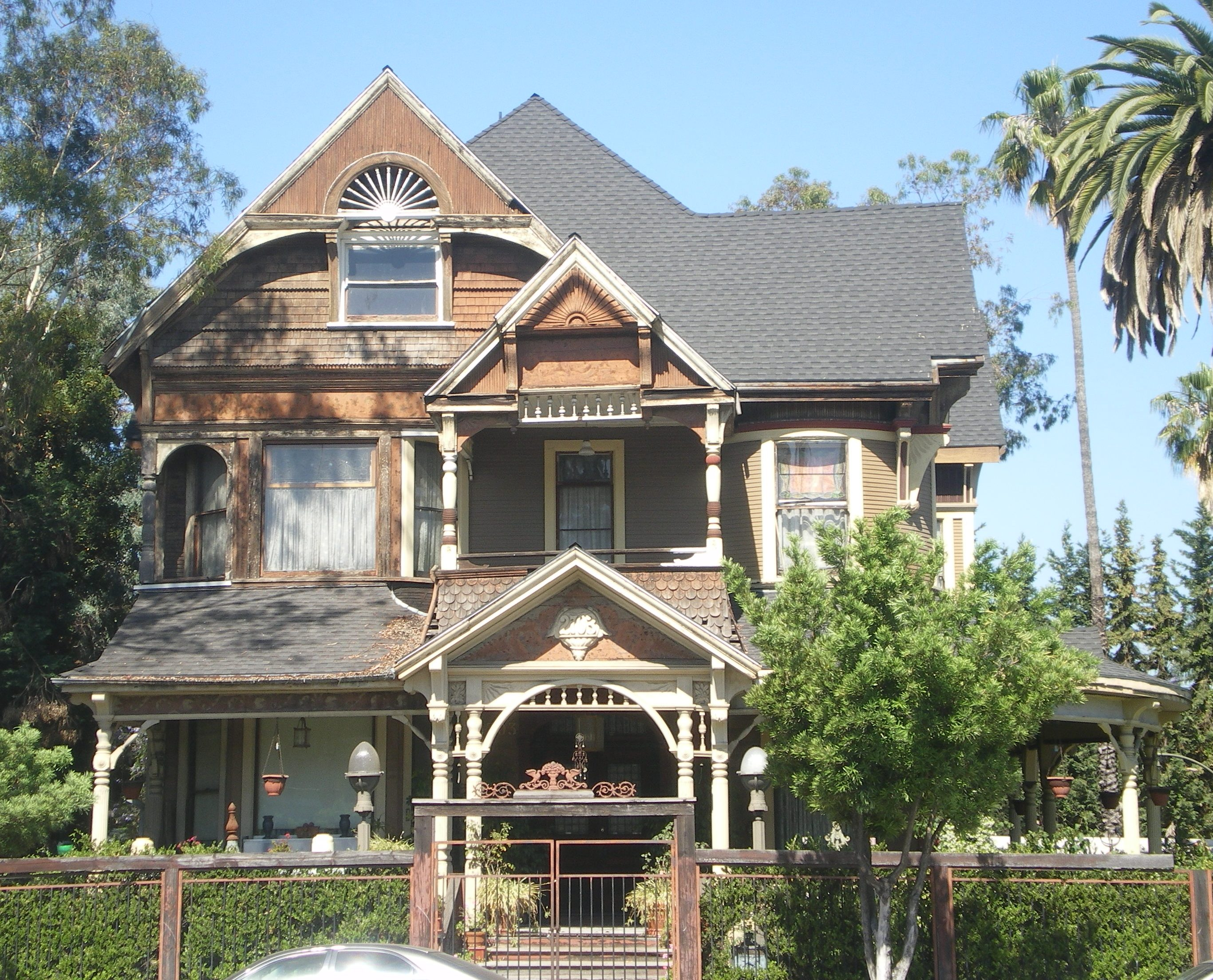
- Alfred J. Salisbury House

- Location within Los Angeles
- Location: North University Park, Los Angeles, California
- Coordinates: 34°1′49″N 118°17′4″W
- Built: 1880
- Architect: Numerous
- Architectural style: Late Victorian, Classical Revival
- NRHP reference No.: 04000016
- Added to NRHP: February 11, 2004

The North University Park Historic District is a historic district in the North University Park neighborhood of Los Angeles, California. It contains numerous well-preserved Victorian houses dating back to 1880. The district was added to the National Register of Historic Places in 2004.

== History ==
The North University Park area was subdivided between 1885 and 1901. The Miller and Herriott House, which is still standing, is believed to have been a model house used by the developers to attract potential buyers. The area boomed further when the street cars from downtown reached the area in 1891. In 1892, the widow of Gen. John C. Fremont, Jessie Benton Fremont, was living in the district at 1107 West 28th Street; she remained in the house until 1902. The district was also the birthplace of Adlai Stevenson, who was born in the house at 2639 Monmouth Avenue in 1900.

== Boundaries ==
The district is bounded by West Adams Boulevard on the north, Magnolia Avenue on the west, Hoover Street on the east, and 28th Street on the south.

== Properties ==
=== Contributing ===
Contributing properties within the district include:

- Alfred J. Salisbury House, 2703 S. Hoover St. — Queen Anne Victorian house designed by Bradbeer & Ferris and built in 1891. Considered an outstanding example of Queen Anne architecture. In 1897, it became the Cumnock School of Oratory, though it was later converted back into a residence. Los Angeles Historic-Cultural Monument #240.

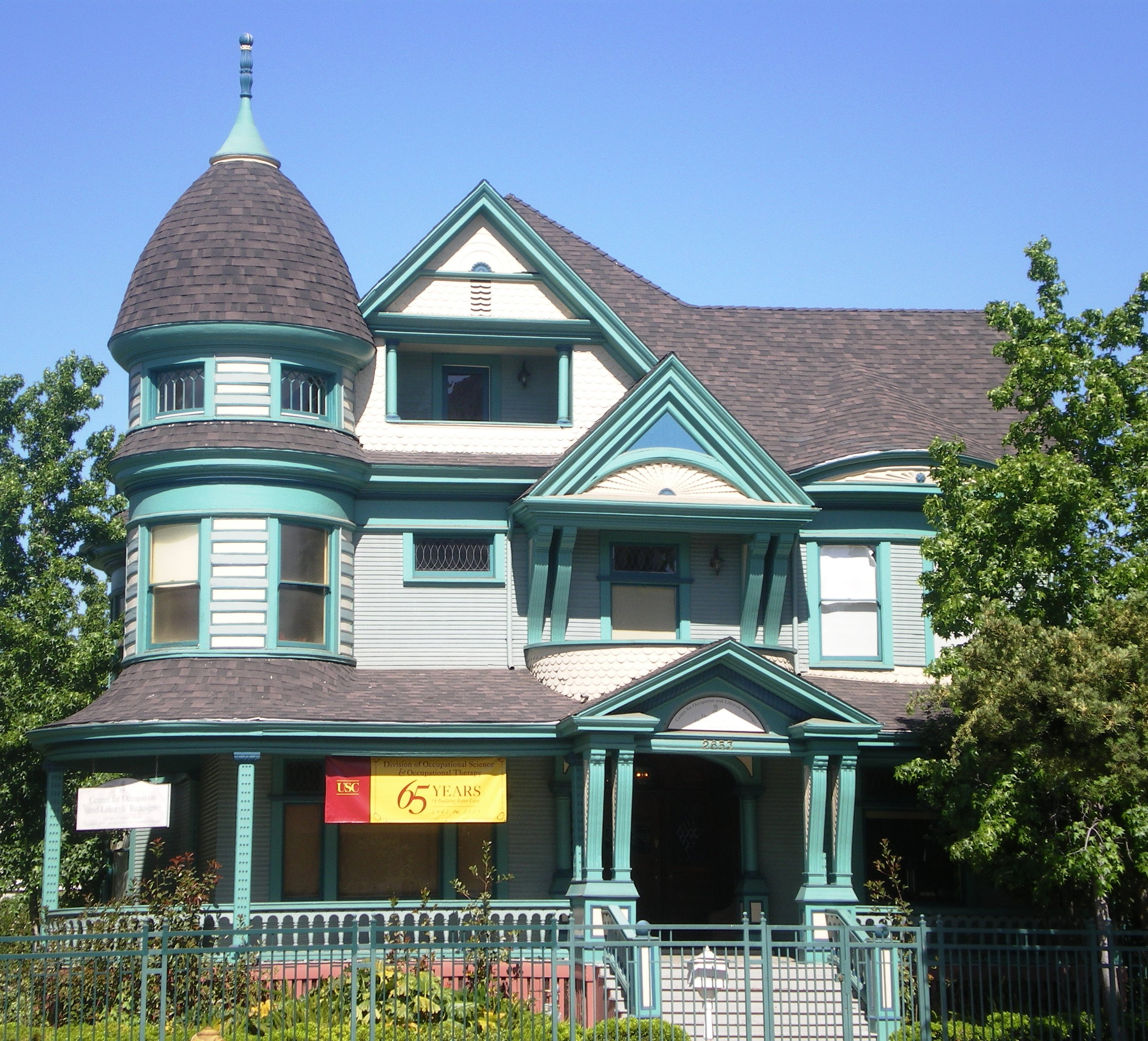
William W. Cockins House

- William W. Cockins House, 2653 S. Hoover St. — Queen Anne Victorian house designed by Bradbeer & Ferris and built in 1894. Considered one of the most impressive examples of late Queen Anne style architecture in Los Angeles. Now owned by the University of Southern California.
- Drake Residence, 2633 S Hoover St. — Transitional Craftsman/Shingle style house designed by Thomas Preston and built in 1901. Contains an original carriage house at the rear of the property.
- A. E. Kelly Residence, 1140 W. Adams Blvd. — Queen Anne Victorian house designed by Bradbeer and Ferris and built in 1892. Depicted in the 1896 edition of Comfortable Los Angeles Homes compiled by the Brown Heating Co.
- 1180 W. Adams Blvd. — Two-story Colonial Revival house built in 1912.

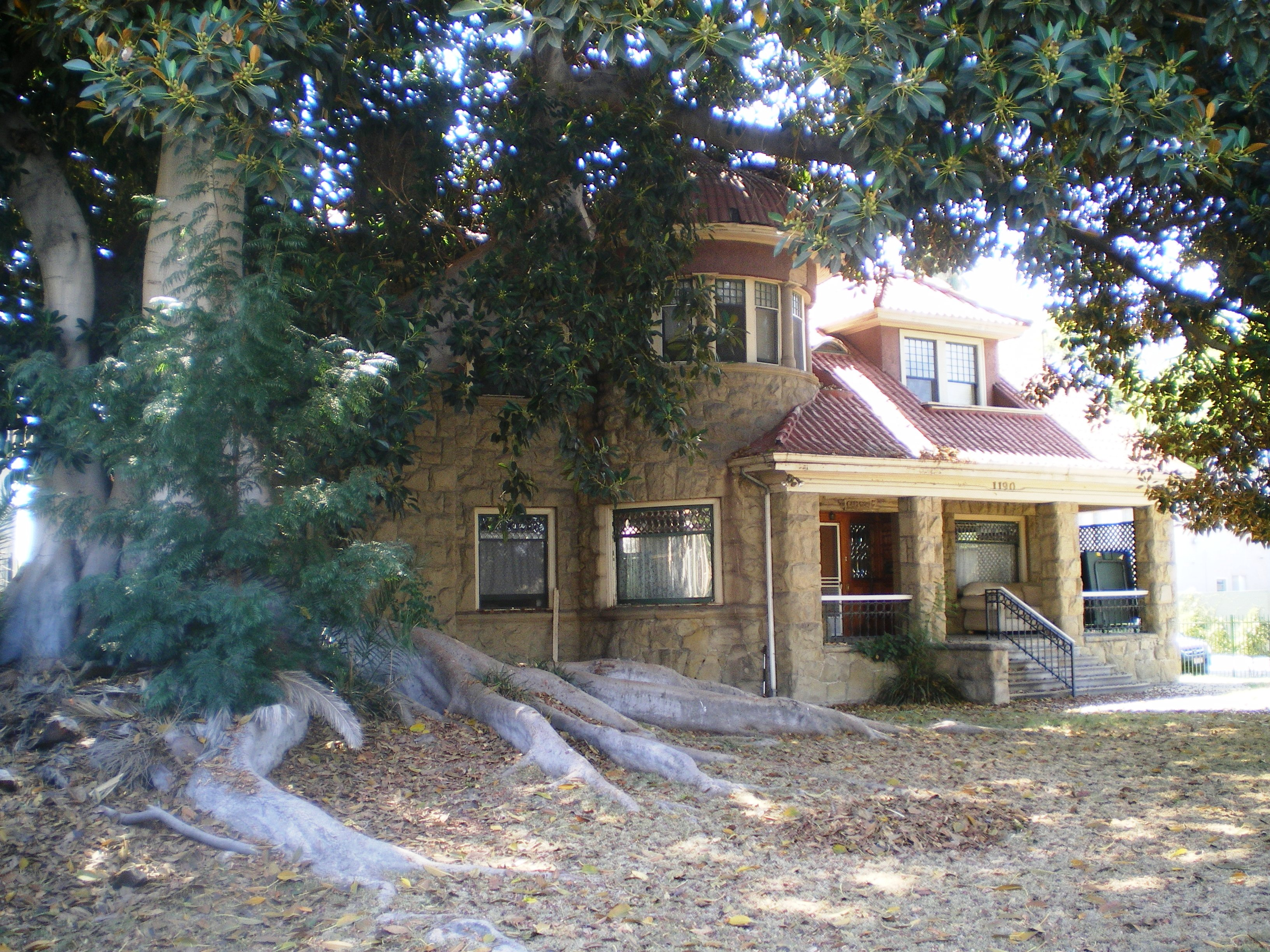
Ibbetson House

- Ibbetson House, 1190 W. Adams Blvd. — Two-story Victorian/Richardsonian Romanesque residence designed by its owner Robert Ibbetson and built c. 1899. Its asymmetrical design includes a two-story tower.
- 2627 Magnolia Ave. — Two-story late Victorian/Craftsman home built in 1907.
- 2631 Magnolia Ave. — Two-story Victorian/American Foursquare home built by Thomas Vigus in 1902.
- 2635 Magnolia Ave. — Two-story Victorian/American Foursquare home built by Thomas Vigus in 1901.
- 2639 Magnolia Ave. — Two-story American Foursquare home built by Thomas Vigus in 1901.
- 2643 Magnolia Ave. — Two-story American Foursquare home built by Thomas Vigus in 1901.
- 2647 Magnolia Ave. — Two-story American Foursquare home built by Thomas Vigus in 1901.
- 2651 Magnolia Ave. — One story house built in 1902.
- 2657 Magnolia Ave. — One story house built in 1902.

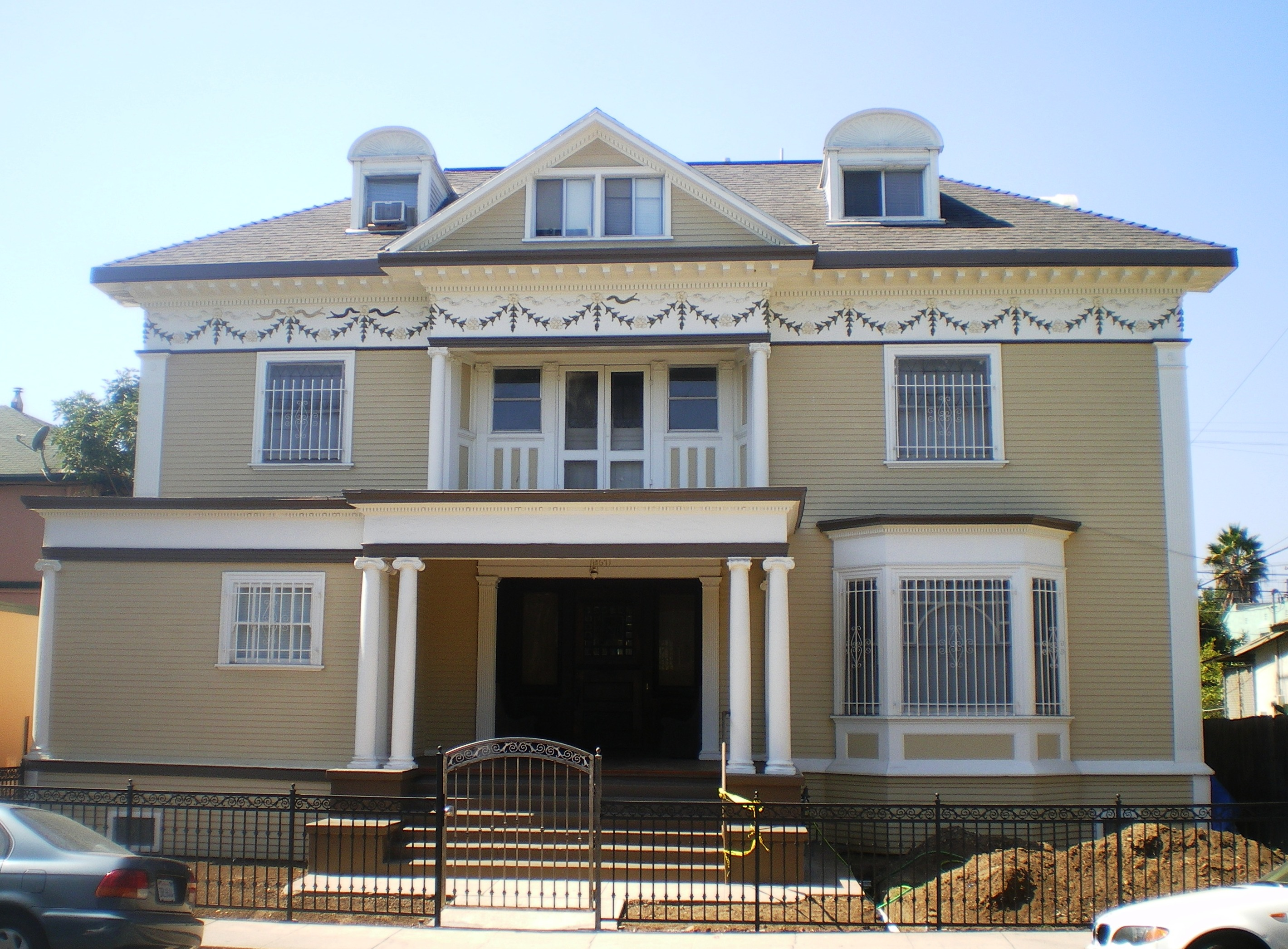
2671 Magnolia Ave.

- 2671 Magnolia Ave. — Colonial Revival house designed by Frederick Roehrig and built in 1894.
- 2620—2626 Magnolia Ave. — Two-story Classical Revival apartment complex designed by Garrett & Bixby and built in 1912.
- 2630 Magnolia Ave. — Two-story American Foursquare/Colonial Revival/late Victorian house built by L. A. Building Co. in 1902.
- 2636 Magnolia Ave. — Two-story late Victorian/Craftsman house built in 1903.
- 2640 Magnolia Ave. — One-story Colonial Revival house built in 1900.
- 2646 Magnolia Ave. — One-story Classical Revival house built in 1904.
- 2650 Magnolia Ave. — One-story Craftsman house designed by Ira Phillips and built in 1908.
- 2666—2668 Magnolia Ave. — Two-story Mediterranean apartment building designed by Lewis Arthur Smith for Jessie D'Arch and built in 1920.
- 2672 Magnolia Ave. — Two-story Mediterranean apartment building built in 1923.

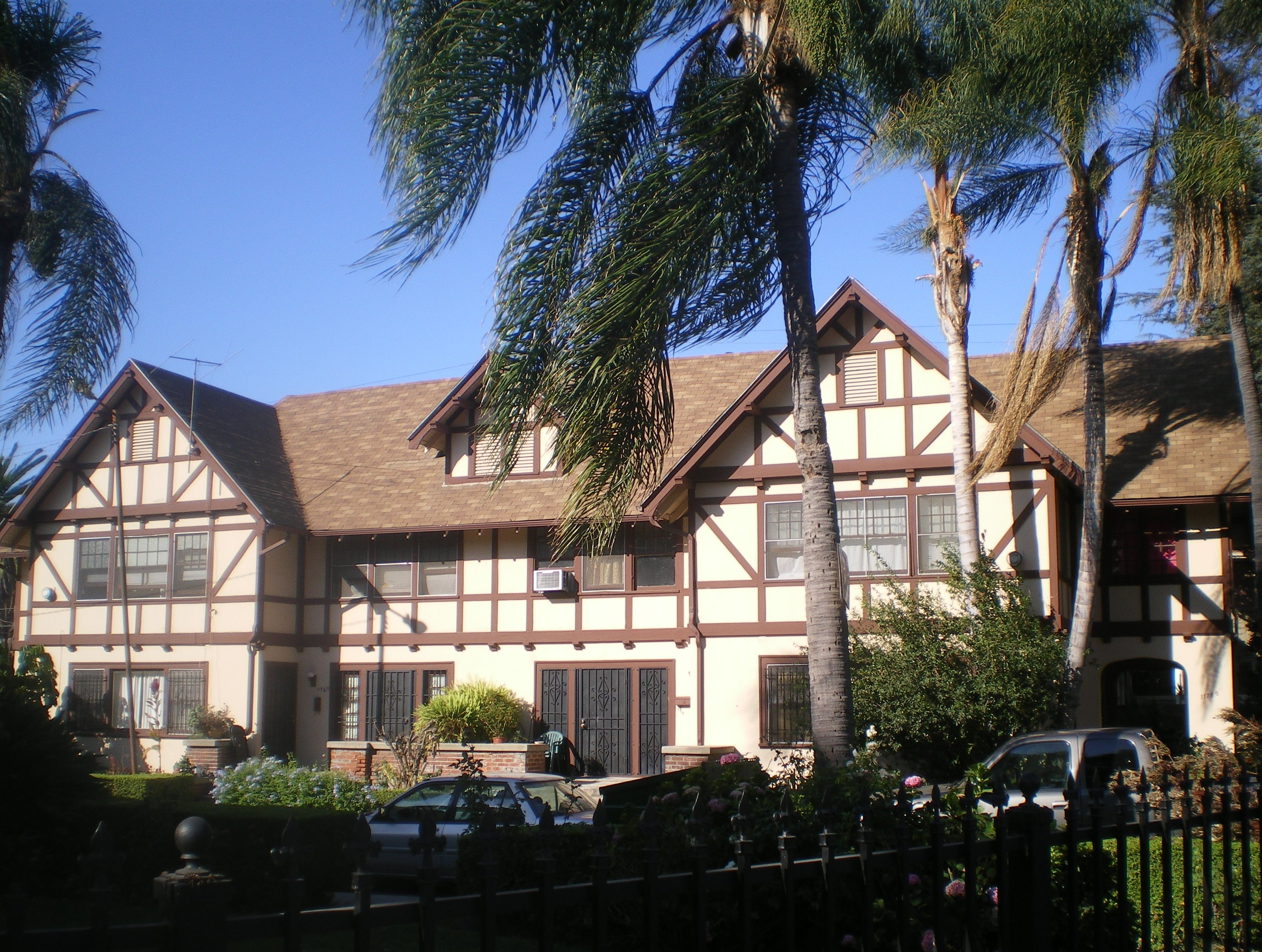
West Adams Gardens

- West Adams Gardens, 1158—1176 W. Adams Blvd. — Seven two-story Tudor Revival buildings designed by Lewis Arthur Smith for Jessie D'Arch and built in 1920. Los Angeles Historic-Cultural Monument #297.
- 2611—2613 Monmouth Ave. — Two-story Mediterranean apartment building built by Arthur A. Bitter in 1924.
- 2627 Monmouth Ave. — Three-story southern Spanish apartment building built in 1929.
- 2635 Monmouth Ave. — Two-story late Victorian/Craftsman house built in 1900.
- 2639 Monmouth Ave. — Two-story Colonial Revival house designed by C. W. Wedgewood and built in 1892. Adlai Stevenson's birthplace. Los Angeles Historic Cultural Monument #35.
- 2643 Monmouth Ave. — Two-story folk Victorian house built in 1894.
- 1131 W. 27th St. — Two-story Mediterranean apartment building designed by Lewis Arthur Smith for Jessie D'Arch and built in 1919.
- 1139 W. 27th St. — Two-story Mediterranean apartment building built elsewhere in 1911 and moved here in 1929.
- 1155 W. 27th St. — Two-story Mediterranean apartment building designed by Lewis Arthur Smith for Jessie D'Arch and built in 1920.

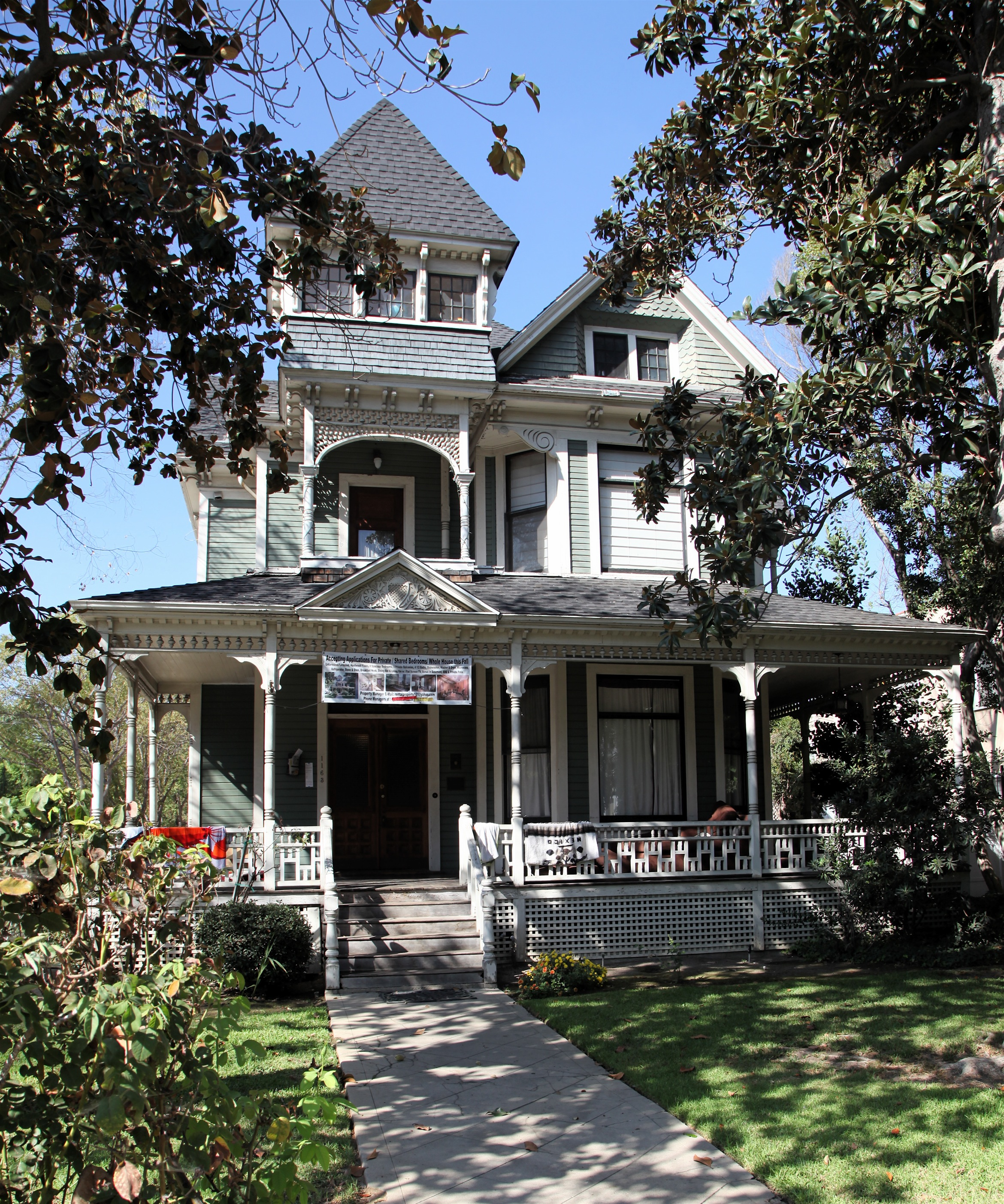
Miller and Herriott House

- Miller and Herriott House, 1163 W. 27th St. — Eastlake Victorian house designed by Joseph Cather Newsom and built in 1887. Separately listed on the National Register of Historic Places and also as Los Angeles Historic Cultural Monument #242.
- Vista Magnolia Court, 1201—1215 West 27th St. — Five two-story apartment buildings designed by Joseph F. Rhodes and built in 1926.

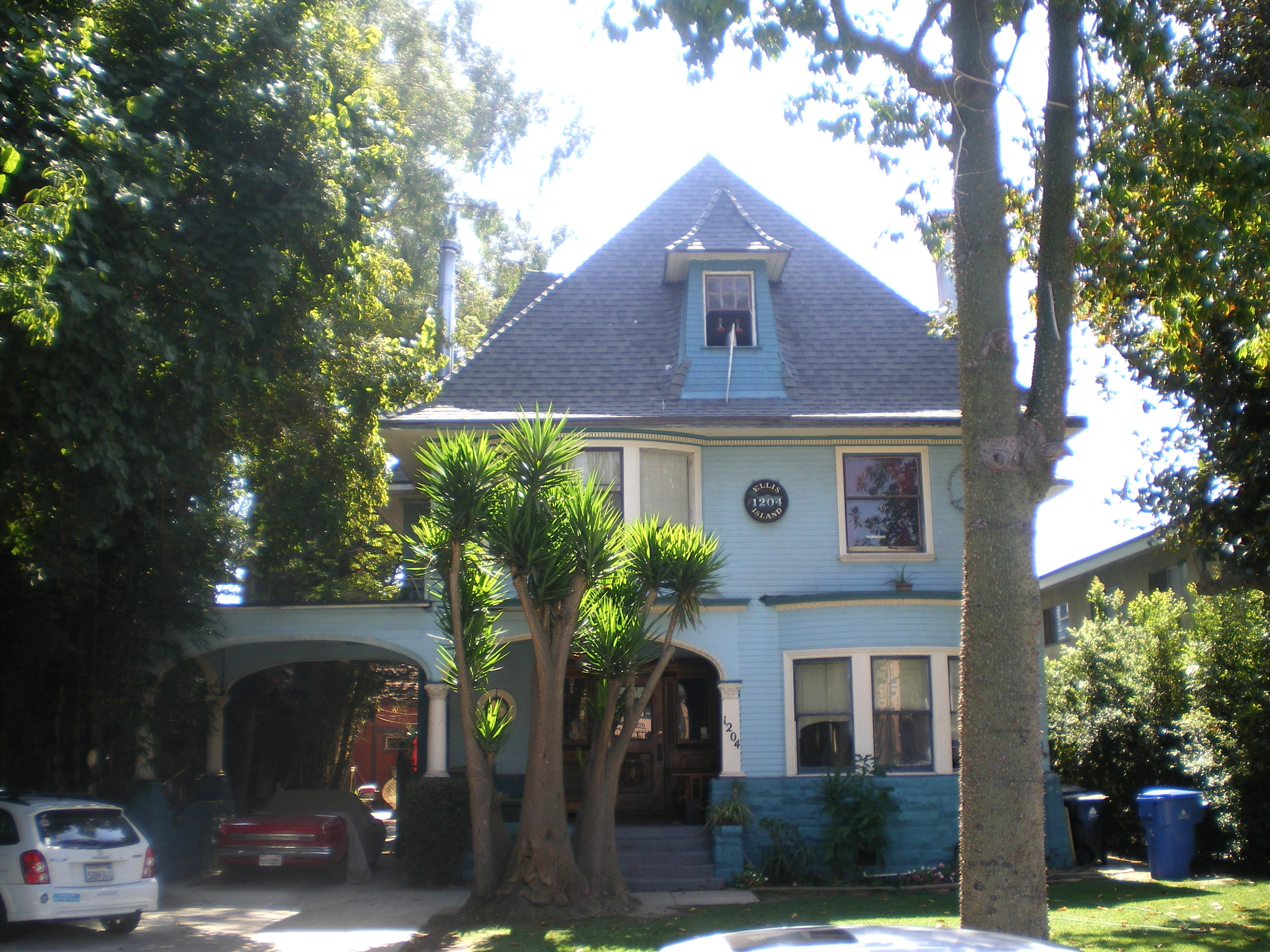
Kiefer Residence

- Kiefer Residence, 1204 W. 27th St. — French-influenced Victorian house designed by Theodore Eisen and Sumner Hunt and built in 1895.
- 1194 W. 27th St. — Transitional Craftsman/Victorian house designed John C. Austin and built in 1906. Los Angeles Historic Cultural Monument #798.
- 1186 W. 27th St. — Craftsman bungalow designed by Arthur S. Heineman and built in 1909.

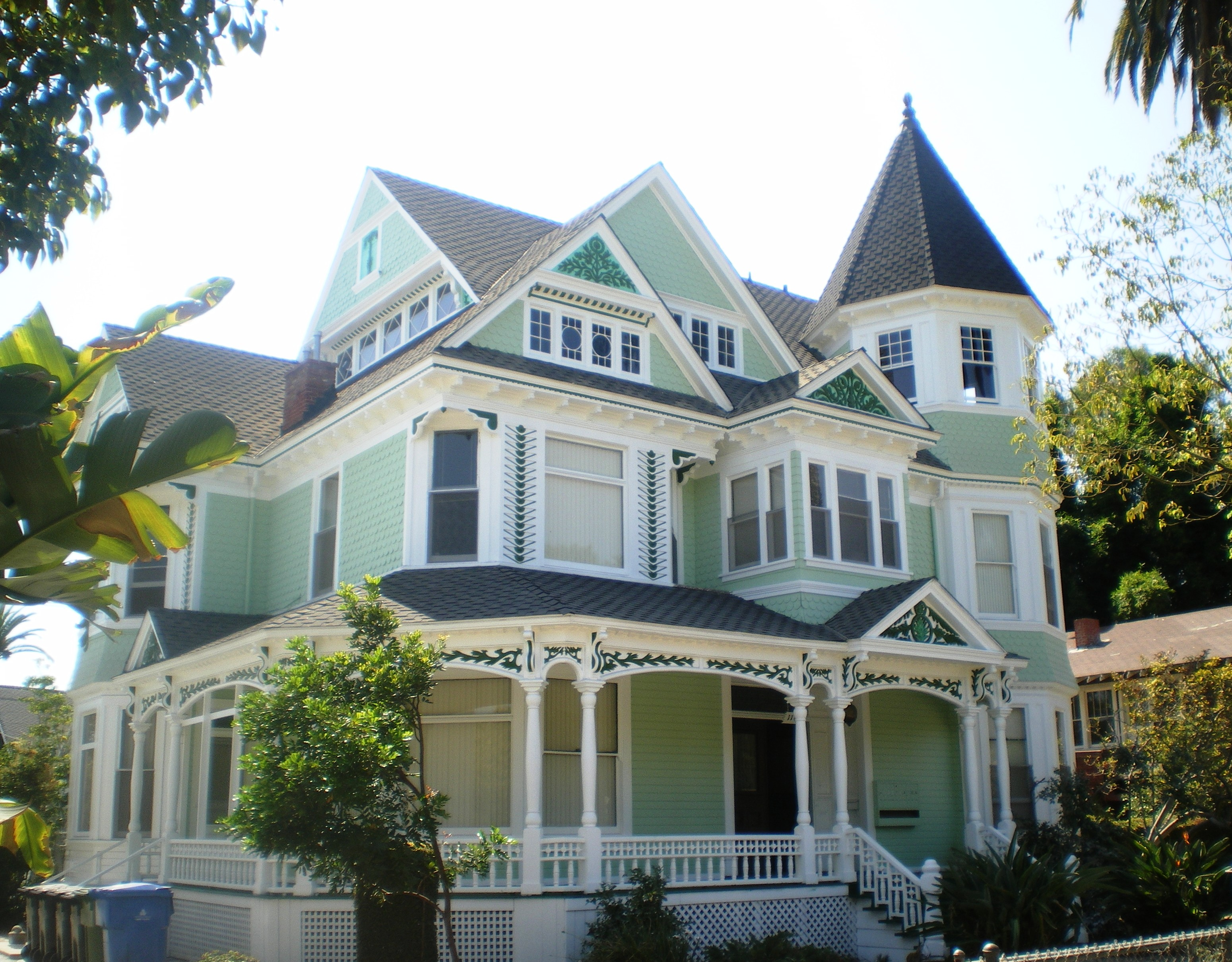
John C. Harrison House

- John C. Harrison House, 1160 W. 27th St. — Queen Anne house built in 1891.
- 1154 W. 27th St. — Two-story Mediterranean apartment building built by F. Heartigan in 1923.

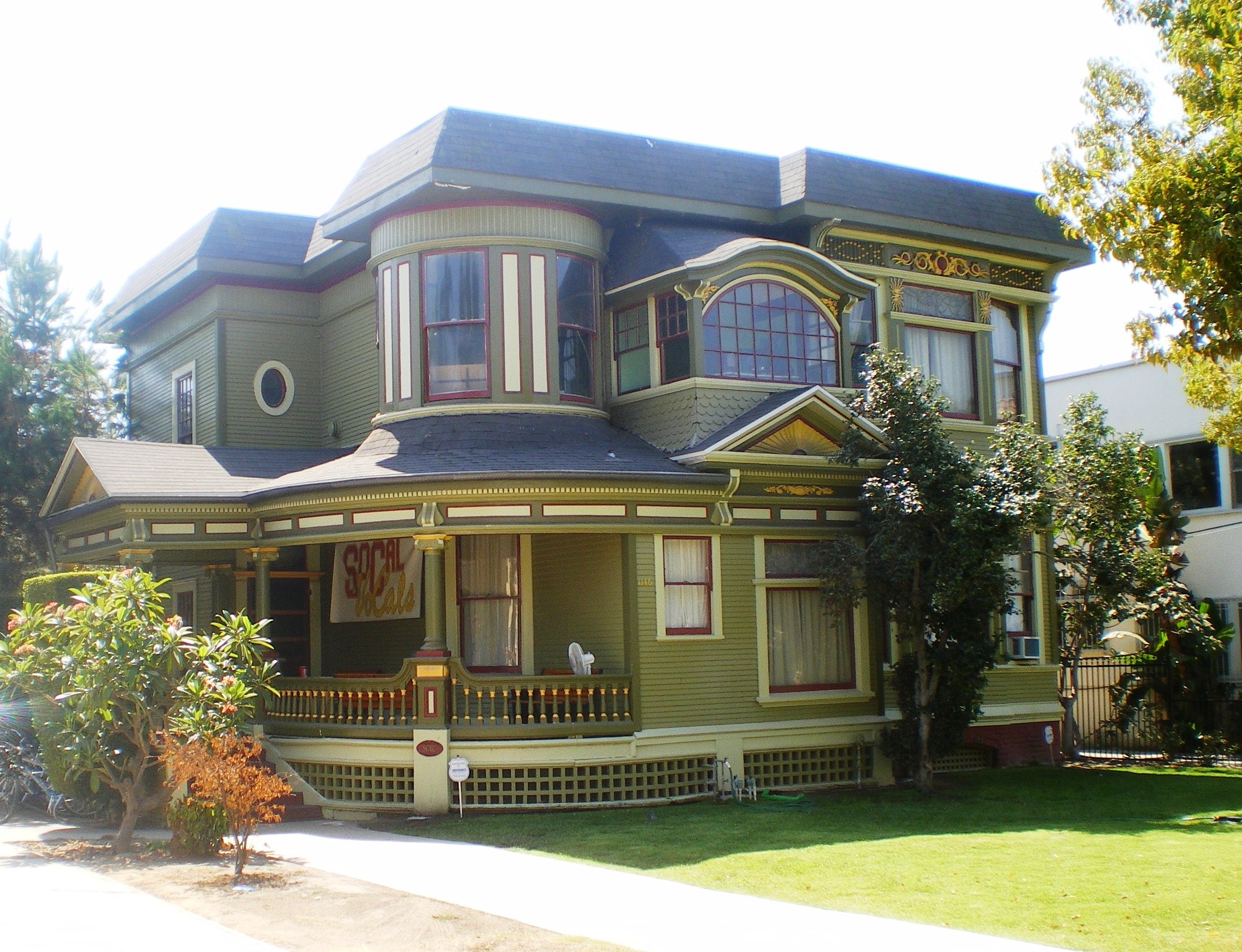
De Pauw Residence

- De Pauw Residence, 1146 W. 27th St. - Queen Anne house built by James Bradbeer of Bradbeer & Ferris for philanthropist Mrs. Francis W. De Pauw in 1897. Later called Stephens House as William Stephens lived here in the 1910s. Its gable was destroyed by a fire in 1952 and never rebuilt.
- 1136 W. 27th St. — Two-story multi-family structure built in 1901.
- 1130 W. 27th St. — Two-story folk Victorian house built in 1895.
- 1120 W. 27th St. — Queen Anne house designed by Bradbeer & Ferris and built in 1894.
- 1117 W. 28th St. — Two-story Mediterranean apartment building designed by Edward Harlamert and built in 1923.
- 1121 W. 28th St. — Two-story folk Victorian house built in 1895.
- 1123 W. 28th St. — Two-story folk Victorian house built in 1893.
- 1177 W. 28th St. — Two-story Craftsman house built in 1901.
- 1179 W. 28th St. — Two-story Colonial Revival house built in 1911.

=== Non-contributing ===
Notable non-contributing properties include:

- 1156 W. Adams Blvd. — Classical Revival apartment building designed by E. B. Rust and built in 1925.
- 2661 Magnolia Ave. — One story house built in 1904. Remodeled in the Spanish Colonial Revival style in the 1920s.
- 2654 Magnolia Ave. — One-story house built in 1910.
- 2660 Magnolia Ave. — Two-story apartment building built in 1915.
- 2623 Monmouth Ave. — American Foursquare house built in 1896, with Spanish Colonial Revival additions in 1929.
- 2633 Monmouth Ave. — Two-story late Victorian structure built in 1895.
- 1129 W. 27th St. — Two-story apartment building remodeled in the Colonial Revival style c. 1950.
- 1140 W. 27th St. — Two-story apartment building built c. 1950.

=== Additional ===
- Maria Antonia Arguella Wilcox House, 1100 W. Adams Blvd. — Spanish Colonial Revival-style house reportedly designed by Frederick Roehrig and built c. 1899. Later became the Sisters of the Company of Mary Convent.

== See also ==
- List of Registered Historic Places in Los Angeles
