= Herman W. Hellman Building =

Building in Los Angeles, California

- U.S. Historic district – Contributing property
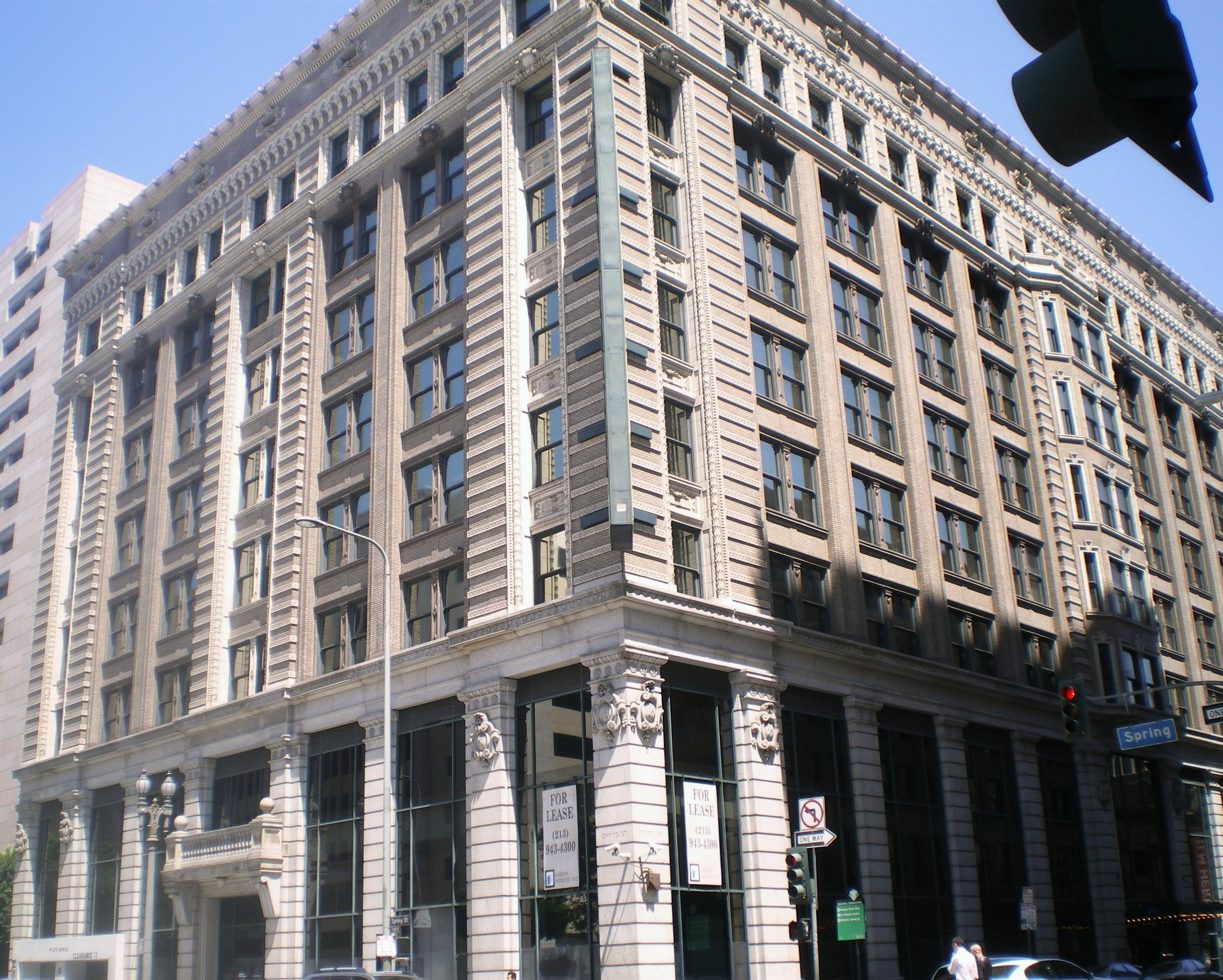
- The building in 2008

- Location within the Los Angeles metropolitan area
- Location: 354 S. Spring Street, Los Angeles, California
- Coordinates: 34.04885°N 118.24800°W
- Built: 1903
- Architect: Alfred Rosenheim
- Architectural style: Commercial Style, Beaux Arts
- Part of: Spring Street Financial District (ID79000489)
- Designated CP: August 10, 1979

Herman W. Hellman Building, also known as Hellman Building, Banco Popular, and Banco Popular de Puerto Rico, is a historic building located at 354 S. Spring Street, on the northeast corner of Fourth and Spring, in downtown Los Angeles, California. It is a contributing property in the Spring Street Financial District.

== History ==
Herman W. Hellman Building was designed by Alfred Rosenheim for Herman W. Hellman and built in 1903. The building cost was $1.5 million ($53.8 million in 2025) and was entirely paid for by Hellman, making it the largest office building investment by an individual in Los Angeles at the time. It was built on the former site of Hellman's house, which was demolished to make way for the building.

The building underwent minor design alterations in the early 1920s and a ninth floor was added in 1924. The building experienced decline in the 1960s and 70s before being bought by Banco Popular de Puerto Rico for $4 million in 1976 ($22.6 million in 2025). The bank then renovated the building. In 1979, the Spring Street Financial District was added to the National Register of Historic Places, with Banco Popular listed as a contributing property in the district.

Hertz Investment Group purchased the building for $4.5 million in 1997 ($9.03 million in 2025), then sold it to Jamison Properties for $6 million in 2002 ($10.7 million in 2025). In 2009, the building was described as having fallen into disrepair. Real estate developer Alan Gross bought the building in 2012. Prior to his purchase, the building's top six floors were home to the Community Redevelopment Agency, which has since become defunct. Three stories were added to the building in 2015, and the building was converted to residential the following year.

== Architecture and design ==
The United States Department of the Interior describes the building as having a Commercial Style design, while the City of Los Angeles, Los Angeles Conservancy, and others describe the design as Beaux Arts. The building is twelve stories in height and was originally eight. It is rectangular in plan, built of pressed brick with a steel frame, and clad in granite with terra cotta ornamentation. A scroll patterned cornice separates the building's base from its shaft, and an egg and dart molding, simplified frieze, and cymatium patterned cornice separates the shaft from the capital. Above the capital is a flat roof and low hanging parapet. Fenestration consists of double-hung windows and casement windows, all made of wood.

The building's south-facing elevation is eleven bays wide; the central bay features an entrance consisting of contemporary double doors inside a simple decorative border and canopy. The west-facing elevation is seven bays wide and, like the south-facing elevation, features a centered double-door entrance inside a decorative border. Above the west-facing entrance is a balconette supported by large brackets and enclosed by heavy balusters and end piers with large globes. A granite water table with piers at the base divide the west-facing elevation's storefront windows, and the west-facing elevation's two northernmost bays feature openings that serve underground parking. The east and north-facing elevations are utilitarian in design.

The building's exterior ornamentation consists of decorative spandrel, window surrounds, rosettes, and carved cartouches. The letters HWH, the initials of the building original owner, are also carved into the building, a motif that is repeated inside. The building lobby is double-height, primarily consists of white marble, and features a massive, geometrically detailed stairway and ceiling with coffers and beams. The hallmark of the building is its stained glass oval dome and skylights. Natural sunlight from the central light well lights the dome, which was painted out during World War II but the paint has since been removed.

== See also ==
- List of contributing properties in the Spring Street Financial District
