= Second Church of Christ, Scientist (Los Angeles) =

- Second Church of Christ, Scientist / The Art of Living Center Los Angeles
- U.S. National Register of Historic Places
- Los Angeles Historic-Cultural Monument
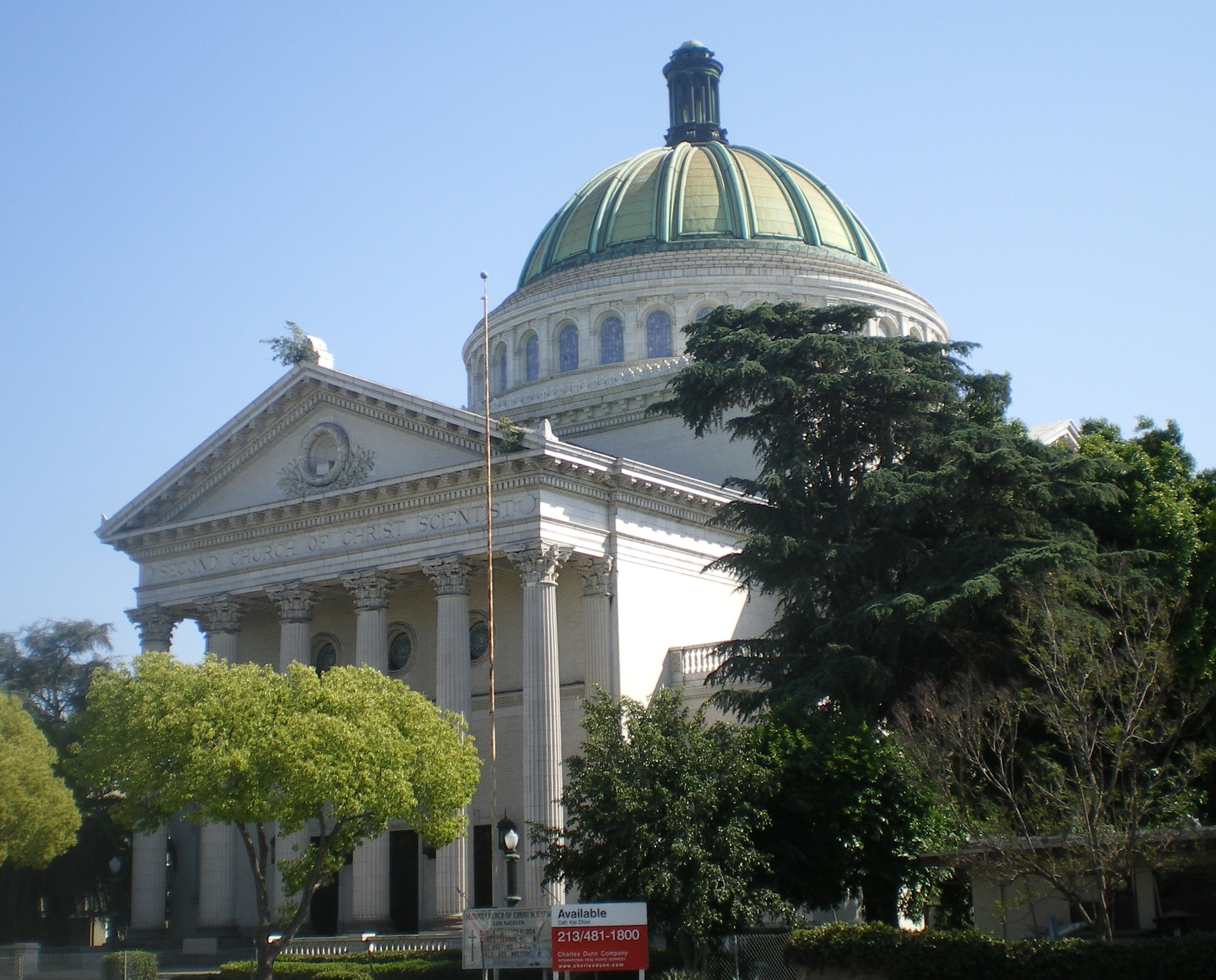
- Second Church of Christ, Scientist, 2008

- Location within the Los Angeles metropolitan area Location within California Location within the United States
- Location: 946 W. Adams Blvd., Los Angeles, California
- Coordinates: 34°2′8″N 118°17′17″W
- Area: 0.6 acres (0.24 ha)
- Built: 1907
- Architect: Alfred H. Rosenheim; engineer: Albert C. Martin
- Architectural style: Classical Revival
- NRHP reference No.: 87000576
- LAHCM No.: 57

Significant dates
- Added to NRHP: April 02, 1987
- Designated LAHCM: July 17, 1968,

Second Church of Christ, Scientist is a historic former Christian Science church building located at 948 West Adams Boulevard. It is located in the North University Park neighborhood in the West Adams district of Los Angeles, California. It is now the Art of Living Center Los Angeles.

== History ==
Designed by noted Los Angeles architect Alfred H. Rosenheim in the Classical Revival style of architecture, it was built in 1910.

On July 17, 1968, the City of Los Angeles designated the building a Los Angeles Historic-Cultural Monument.

The church was used as the courthouse in the crime drama Matlock and as a location for other film and TV projects.

== The Art of Living Foundation ==
In late 2009, the Church property was sold to the non-profit Art of Living Foundation. It was restored and is used as a community center, speaking and music venue, and is a center for the Foundation's service work and breathing, meditation, and other programs. While the Art of Living Foundation has been active in Southern California since the late 1980s, it officially opened in this location on April 14, 2010.

== National register listing ==
- Second Church of Christ, Scientist (added 1987 - Building - #87000576)
- 946 W. Adams Blvd., Los Angeles
- Historic Significance: Event, Architecture/Engineering
- Architect, builder, or engineer: Albert C. Martin, Sr., Alfred Rosenheim
- Architectural Style: Classical Revival
- Area of Significance: Architecture, Religion
- Period of Significance: 1900-1924
- Owner: Private
- Historic Function: Religion
- Historic Sub-function: Religious Structure
- Current Function: Non-profit educational and humanitarian
- Current Sub-function: Community service, personal development, trauma relief—501(c)(3)

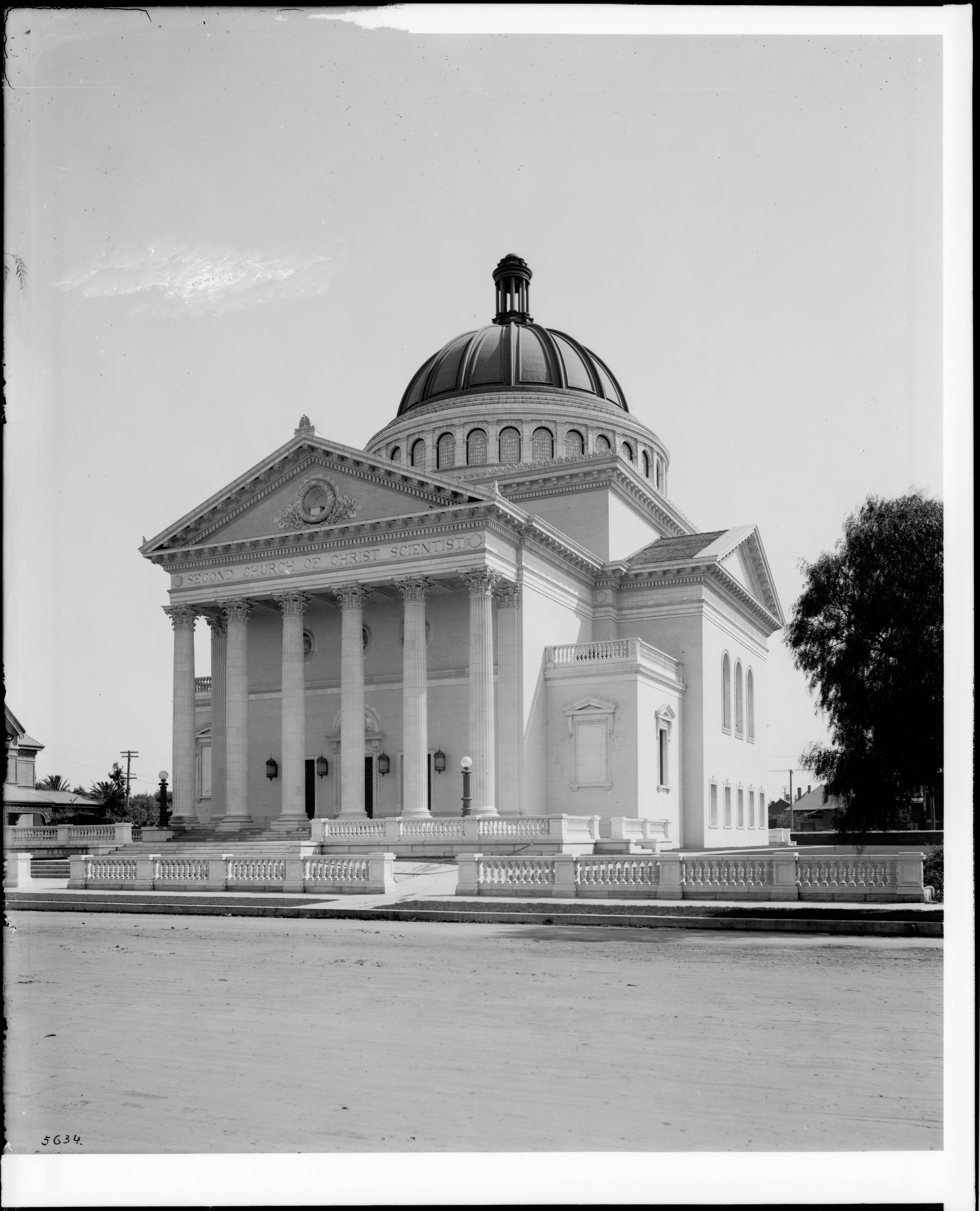
c. 1910

== See also ==
- First Church of Christ, Scientist (Los Angeles, California)
- List of Los Angeles Historic-Cultural Monuments in South Los Angeles
- List of Registered Historic Places in Los Angeles
- Second Church of Christ, Scientist (disambiguation)
