= North University Park, Los Angeles =

North University Park
- Neighborhood of Los Angeles
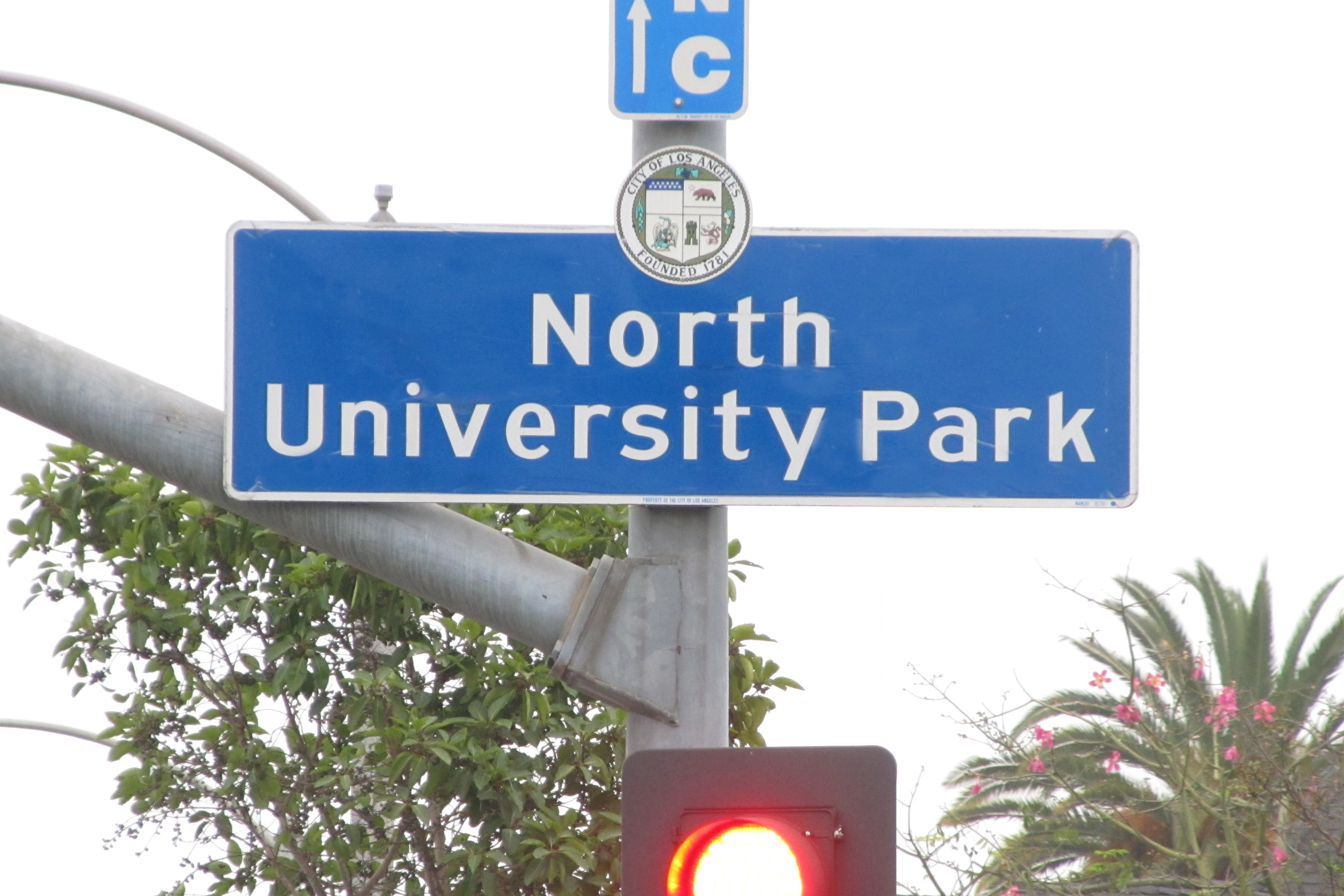
- North University Park neighborhood sign located at the intersection of Vermont Avenue and Adams Boulevard

- Location within Central Los Angeles
- Coordinates: 34°1′48″N 118°17′20″W
- Country: United States of America
- State: California
- County: Los Angeles
- Time zone: Pacific
- Zip Code: 90007
- Area code: 213

North University Park is a neighborhood in Los Angeles, California. Located just north of the University of Southern California, North University Park contains two historic districts that are both on the National Register of Historic Places: The North University Park Historic District and the Menlo Avenue–West Twenty-ninth Street Historic District.

== Geography ==
North University Park is bounded between Vermont Avenue on the West, Figueroa Street on the East, Adams Boulevard on the North and Jefferson Boulevard on the South.

The City of Los Angeles has installed North University Park neighborhood signs at the intersections of Adams Boulevard and Figueroa Street, Adams Boulevard and Vermont Avenue, Jefferson Boulevard and Vermont Avenue, and Jefferson Boulevard and Figueroa Street.

== History ==
Located just north of USC's campus, North University Park was agricultural land until the late 19th century. The neighborhood currently features Victorian and Craftsman homes dating back to the 1800s.

== Historic Districts ==
There are two Historic Districts in North University Park.

The Menlo Avenue–West Twenty-ninth Street Historic District is bounded by West Adams Boulevard on the north, Ellendale on the east, West Thirtieth Street on the south, and Vermont Avenue to the west. The district was added to the National Register of Historic Places in 1987.

The North University Park Historic District is bounded by West Adams Boulevard on the north, Magnolia Avenue on the west, Hoover Street on the east, and 28th Street on the south. The district was added to the National Register of Historic Places in 2004.

== Historic-Cultural Monuments ==
(Listing of monuments not included in either the Menlo Avenue–West Twenty-ninth Street Historic District or the North University Park Historic District.)

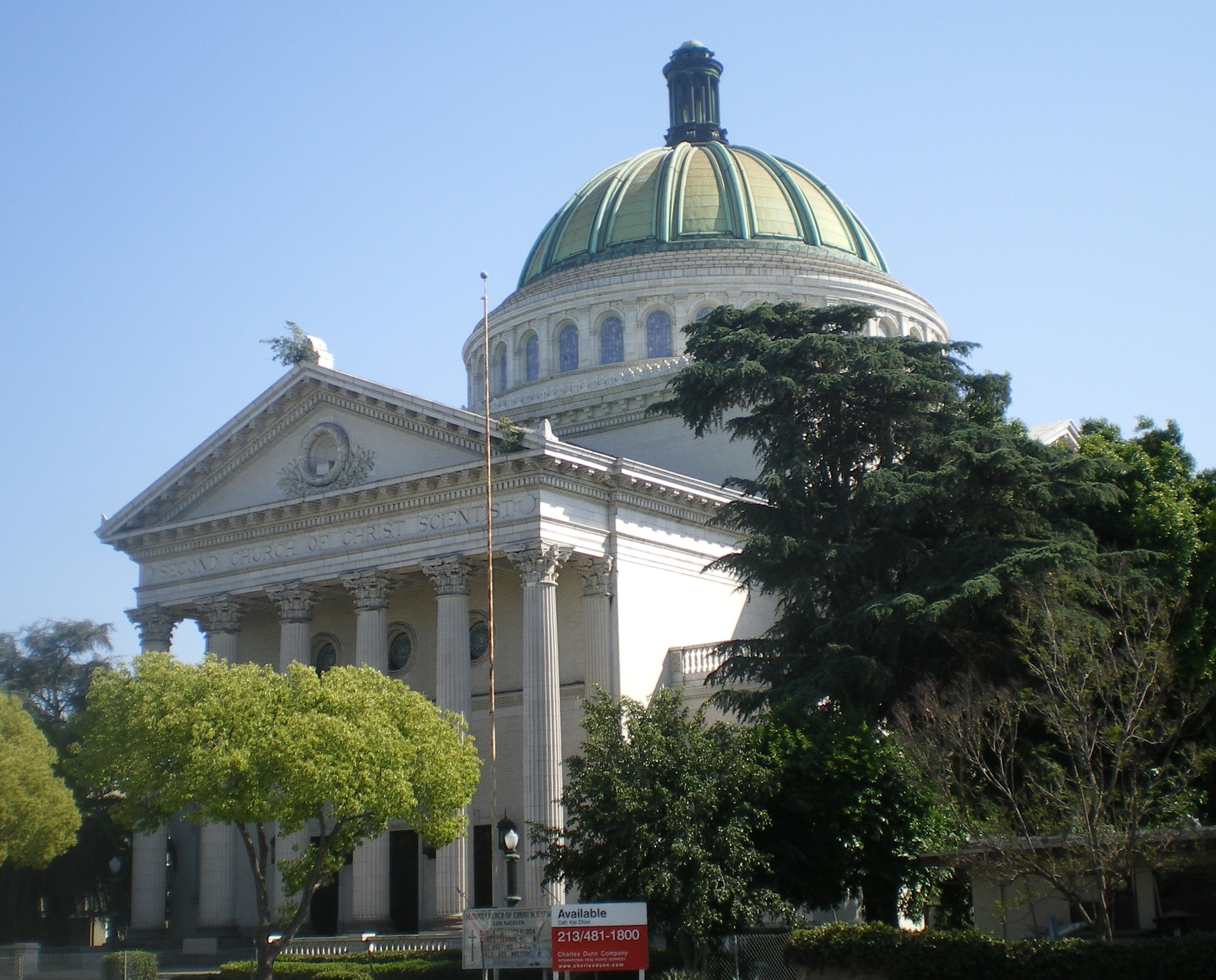
Second Church of Christ, Scientist, 2008

- Second Church of Christ, Scientist – 946 West Adams Boulevard. It was designated as Historic-Cultural Monument #57 on July 17, 1968. It was also added to the National Register of Historic Places on April 2, 1987.

== North University Park Specific Plan ==
Within North University Park is the city designated "North University Park Specific Plan". The Specific Plan applies to the area between Vermont Avenue on the West, Hoover Street on the East, Adams Boulevard on the North and 30th Place on the South. The purpose of the Specific Plan is to regulate floor area ratios, the use of land and buildings, height and bulk of buildings, architectural and landscape treatment, signs, and vehicular and pedestrian circulation.

== Notable people ==
- Adlai Stevenson II – His birthplace home is located at 2639 Monmouth Avenue in the North University Park Historic District.

== Media ==
Annalise Keating's Victorian Home from the television show How to Get Away With Murder is located in North University Park at 1130 W. 27th Street (27th Street at Monmouth Ave).
