= Beth Levin (linguist) =

American linguist

Beth Levin (/ləˈviːn/ lə-VEEN; born 1955) is an American linguist who is currently the William H. Bonsall Professor in the Humanities at Stanford University. Her research investigates the lexical semantics of verbs, particularly the representation of events and the kind of morphosyntactic devices that English and other languages use to express events and their participants.

== Career ==
She received her Ph.D. from Massachusetts Institute of Technology in 1983 and then spent four years at the MIT Center for Cognitive Science, where she had major responsibility for the Lexicon Project.

From 1987 to 1999 she was a professor in the Department of Linguistics at Northwestern University, serving as the Department chair from 1996-1999. She joined the Stanford Department of Linguistics in September 1999 and served as the department chair there from 2003-2007 and 2010-2011. In 1999-2000 she was a fellow at the Center for Advanced Study in the Behavioral Sciences.

== Awards and honors ==
- Fellow, Cognitive Science Society (2019)
- GradEd Champion, Office of the Vice Provost for Graduate Education, Stanford University (2018)
- Fellow, the Linguistic Society of America in 2014.
- Humanities and Sciences Dean's Award for Excellence in Graduate Education, Stanford University, (2013-2014)
- Fellow, John Simon Guggenheim Memorial Foundation (2008)
- Erskine Fellowship, University of Canterbury, Christchurch, New Zealand, (2004)
- Fellow, Center for Advanced Study in the Behavioral Sciences (1999-2000)

== Key publications ==
Levin. B. and S. Pinker (eds.). 1992. Lexical and Conceptual Semantics. Blackwell.

Levin, B. 1993. English Verb Classes and Alternations: A Preliminary Investigation. University of Chicago Press.

Levin, B. and M. Rappaport Hovav. 1995. Unaccusativity: At the Syntax-Lexical Semantics Interface. (Linguistic Inquiry Monograph 26) MIT Press.

M. Rappaport Hovav and B. Levin. 2001. An event structure account of English resultatives. Language 77, 766-797. doi:10.1353/lan.2001.0221.

Levin, B. and M. Rappaport Hovav. 2005. Argument Realization. Research Surveys in Linguistics Series. Cambridge University Press.

Christopher Kennedy and Beth Levin. 2008. Measure of Change: The Adjectival Core of Degree Achievements. In: Adjectives and Adverbs: Syntax, Semantics and Discourse. Oxford University Press. ISBN 978-0-19-921162-3

Levin, B. 2015. Semantics and Pragmatics of Argument Alternations. Annual Review of Linguistics 1, 63-83.
