= William Hartshorn Bonsall =

American politician and publisher (1846-1905)

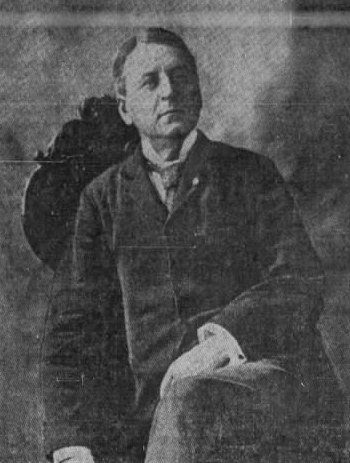

Acting Mayor of Los Angeles
- In office December 5, 1892 – December 12, 1892
- Preceded by: Henry T. Hazard
- Succeeded by: Thomas E. Rowan

Personal details
- Born: February 10, 1846 Cincinnati, Ohio
- Died: July 20, 1905 (aged 59) Los Angeles, California

William Hartshorn Bonsall (February 10, 1846 – July 20, 1905) was an American military man, newspaper and magazine publisher, real-estate investor and insurance adjuster who was the effective manager of the California Veterans home in the 19th century and was a president of the Los Angeles City Council in the 20th.

== Early life ==
Bonsall was born on February 10, 1846, in Cincinnati, Ohio, the son of Samuel Bonsall and Mary Mills. He went to school in Cincinnati and Ironton, Ohio.

== Military ==
Bonsall joined the Union Army in August 1862 as a private in the 117th Ohio Infantry, which reorganized as the 1st Ohio Heavy Artillery. In 1863 he was promoted to regimental commissary sergeant and then to regimental quartermaster. At the close of the Civil War in 1865, he was offered the rank of major, but declined due to the death of his father, which made him responsible for the rest of the family.

== Vocation ==
Bonsall began his civilian career in the insurance business in Portsmouth, then for two years was one of the editors and publishers of the Portsmouth Tribune. The family then moved to Elizabeth, New Jersey, where he resumed the insurance business and was also publisher of an insurance journal.

In November 1866 the family moved to Los Angeles, where he began a real estate business along with Theodore Wiesendanger in the Bryson Block at the corner of Main and Court streets. He later became a traveling adjuster for an insurance company.

In 1887 Bonsall was an investor in the Centinela Land Company, headed by developer Daniel Freeman, and the Redondo Beach Company, as well as the Anaheim Street Car Company, with Wiesendanger. In 1889 he was one of the investors in a proposed narrow-gauge railway between Los Angeles and Redondo, with "steamers, tugs, vessels, barges, etc., to run in connection with the railway."

== Public service ==
=== Veterans Home ===
During the Republican president William McKinley's administration, Bonsall was appointed a member of the Board of Managers of the National Home for Disabled Volunteer Soldiers. Because he lived in Los Angeles County, the veterans home there came under his control as the effective local manager. He served for six years before resigning, his post being filled by former California Governor Henry Markham of Pasadena.

Requiring approval by Congress in a joint resolution, his 1898 appointment was opposed in the House of Representatives by Rep. Eugene F. Loud, who said that he had not received a "fair hearing" in the matter and that Bonsall was "unknown to the volunteer soldiers." The resolution was approved by a vote of 126 to 56.

As a board member, Bonsall made trips to the East on business. He was in Buffalo, New York, the day President McKinley died, and with other board members he attended the funeral ceremonies in Washington, D.C., and Canton, Ohio.

He left the board in 1904, with this statement:

This Soldiers' Home business takes up a great deal of time. There is no salary nor other monetary compensation in it, and I think some other gentleman should have a chance to secure the honor for the next few years. I want to add that I cannot forget how gracefully ex-Gov. Markham acted six years ago, when he withdrew in my favor; and as his name is now mentioned among those of other distinguished gentlemen, I think it is a graceful thing in me to withdraw in his favor.

=== City Council ===
In 1889, Bonsall was elected on the Republican ticket to the City Council from the 3rd Ward, running against Charles Gassen, the Democratic nominee, and Dr. Bryant, an independent. Two years later he was reelected and then chosen by the council as its president.

=== Other ===
In September 1890, Bonsall was chairman of the city's Board of Public Works, and in July 1891 he was temporary secretary of the Los Angeles County Highway and Forestry Association, which was working to establish and maintain "credible highways" in the county. In December 1892, he served as acting Mayor of Los Angeles for a week.

== Personal life ==
Bonsall was married on October 2, 1871, in Portsmouth, Ohio, to Ellen Doddridge McFarland of Los Angeles. They had five children, Samuel N., Albert M., Jennie (Mrs. Thomas P. Newton), Elisa (Mrs. Samuel M. Haskins) and Bessie (Mrs. Ernest C. Hamilton).

== Death ==
Bonsall died on July 20, 1905, in the family home at 1315 West Adams Street (in today's University Park area), at the age of 59. He had complained of a heart ailment ten days previously, and been ill all that time. Besides his wife and children, he was survived by two brothers and three sisters – Charles and Edward Bonsall of Ohio and Mrs. Morenci of Los Angeles and Mrs. William Higgins and Mrs. B.F. Richardson of Ohio.

Although Bonsall was a member of the Christian Science Church at the time of his death, private funeral services at his home and public services at Rosedale Cemetery were officiated by J.J. Wilkins, dean of the Episcopal St. Paul's Pro-Cathedral. Pallbearers included Harrison Gray Otis, the publisher of the Los Angeles Times. Some three hundred veterans were brought by private railroad car via the Los Angeles-Pacific Electric Company from the Sawtelle depot to attend.

== Legacy ==
Bonsall's family home on West Adams Boulevard, by then in decrepit condition, was rescued from demolition in 1980. At least one developer wanted to raze the building, which by 1980 had been divided into cheap apartments, and construct low-cost, government-subsidized public housing. The deal, however, fell through, and the building remains a multiple-family structure.

Bonsallo Avenue was named for him. He lived less than a mile from the street's northern segment (near the corner of West Adams Blvd and Vermont Avenue).

Another street, Bonsall Avenue, on the campus of the West Los Angeles Medical Center, was also named in his honor.

== Notes and references ==
Access to the Los Angeles Times links may require the use of a library card.
