= Norman O. Houston =

American businessman (1893–1981)

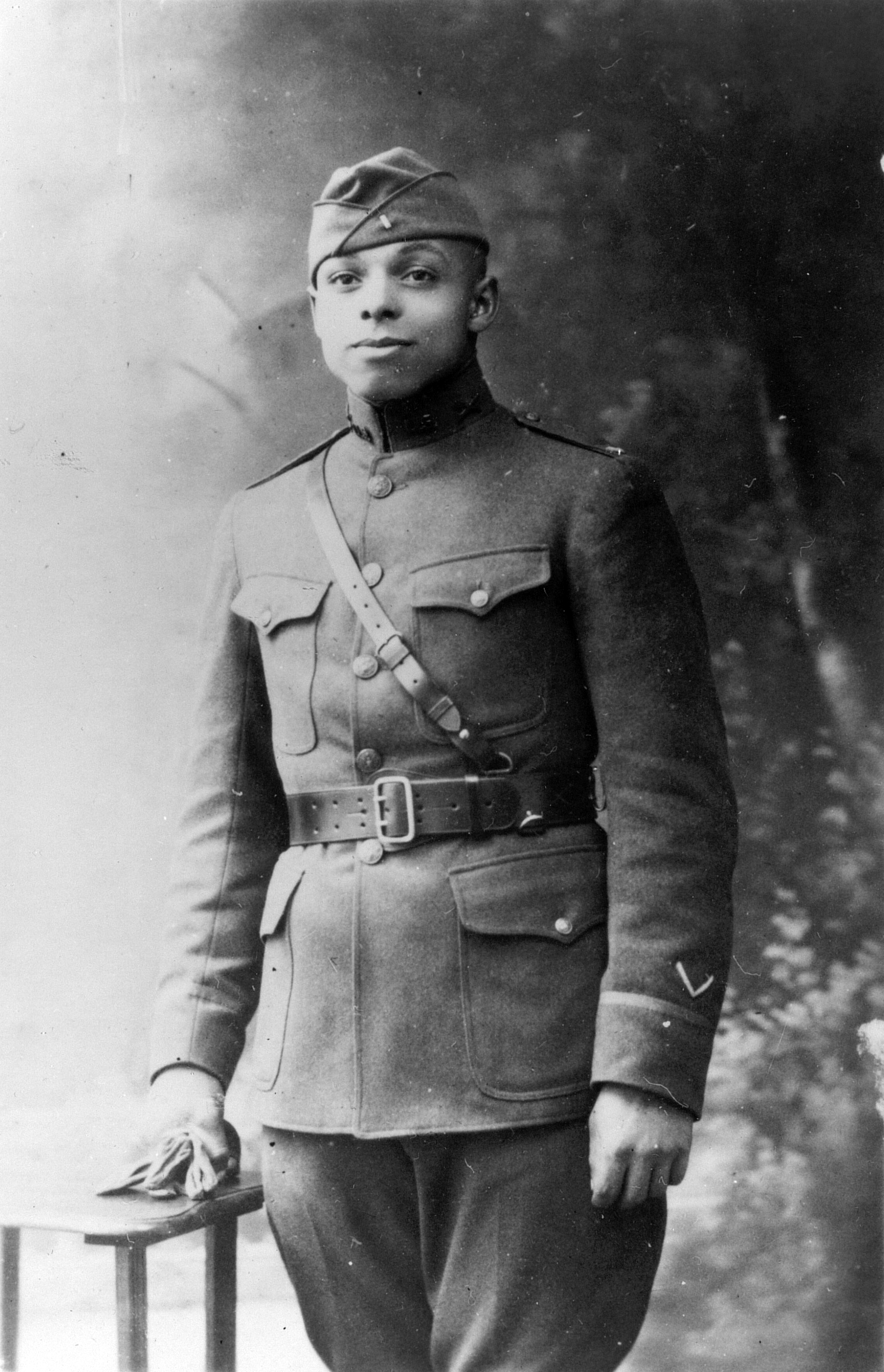
- Houston as a soldier in World War I
- Born: October 16, 1893; San Jose, California, US
- Died: October 20, 1981 (aged 88); Los Angeles, California, US
- Education: California
- Occupation: Businessman
- Known for: President of Golden State Mutual Life Insurance Company

Norman O. Houston was an American businessman and president of Golden State Mutual Life Insurance Company, which at one time was the largest black-owned business west of the Mississippi.

== Early life and career ==
Norman Oliver Houston was born on October 16, 1893, in San Jose, California, the son of Oliver Houston, a railroad porter and his wife, the former Lillian L. Jackson. His parents divorced when he was 12 years old. He was raised by his mother and stepfather in Fruitvale, Oakland, California. After graduating from high school, he attended the University of California, Berkeley for two years where he studied business administration. He then worked for approximately a year as a clerk for the board of insurance underwriters in California, before returning to UC Berkeley.

However, his studies were interrupted this time by World War I. Houston was drafted by the U. S. Army, where he served as the regimental personnel adjutant with the 32nd Division—the only African American to hold that position in the entire army. Upon his discharge, he once again returned to UC Berkeley to attend summer school, but left the following fall to become an agent with the National Life Insurance Company in Los Angeles. At National Life, Houston sold insurance to black waiters and cooks at the railroad commissary.

In the early 1920s, when William Nickerson, Jr. arrived in Los Angeles to establish a branch of the Texas-based American Mutual Benefit Association, he needed someone with local contacts who had some knowledge of the insurance business. As a result, he hired Houston as his first employee. Houston served as superintendent of agents for the new branch. In 1923, feeling he could make more money at a locally based company than one based out of state, Houston informed Nickerson that he signed a contract with Liberty Building and Loan Association. Houston was replaced by George A. Beavers, Jr., a Georgia-born businessman who was one of the first salesmen hired at the branch.

Louis M. Blodgett was the principal figure behind Liberty, who would later start Angelus Funeral Home in Los Angeles in 1925. Houston worked there as a field manager with the difficult task of selling bonds to economically strapped African Americans. He did not stay long with Liberty in the wake of an appealing business opportunity from his former employer.

== Golden State ==
In 1925, when William Nickerson, Jr. decided to form Golden State Guarantee Fund Insurance Company in Los Angeles he convinced Houston to join him in the new venture. Nickerson asked Houston, who had previously worked with the insurance commission, to meet with them to determine the requirements to form an insurance company in California. They decided to establish the firm under Chapter 6 of the Insurance Code which required that five hundred life insurance policies be obtained and paid for in advance, and that a fund of $15,000 be deposited with the Department of Insurance. Houston, with his financial contacts, was given the responsibility to raise the $15,000 through the sale of fifty dollar certificates. Golden State was granted their license on July 23, 1925.

At this time it was very difficult for the approximately 40,000 blacks in California to obtain insurance from white-owned companies at reasonable rates. Starting in a small, one-room office on 1435 South Central Avenue, the initial officers were Nickerson (president), Beavers (vice president) and Houston as secretary/treasurer. In less than three months, the company had already outgrown their cramped offices and moved to a large storeroom on 3512 Central Avenue. Under Nickerson's leadership, Golden State Mutual prospered.

The following years were a period of rapid growth and expansion. By 1928, the company had grown to 100 employees and built a new headquarters at 4261 Central Avenue. That same year Golden State joined the National Negro Insurance Association. In 1931, the name was changed to Golden State Mutual Life Insurance Company. The firm opened its first office outside of California in 1938 when a branch was established in Chicago. Also in 1938, the officers asked the insurance commission to allow them to convert from assessment to legal reserve status. This required a $250,000 fund be deposited with the state, which was completed by 1941. In 1944, Golden State opened an office in Nickerson's home state of Texas. When Nickerson died in 1945, Houston assumed leadership of the company. At that time, Golden State Mutual Life Insurance Company was the seventh largest black insurance firm in the United States and the largest black-owned business west of the Mississippi.

With Houston at the helm, Golden State Mutual continued its growth and expansion. In 1946, they set up their Funeral Services Division. Three years later, the company opened a new building on the corner of Adams Boulevard and Western Avenue in Los Angeles that was designed by prominent architect Paul Williams. During the 1950s, Golden State expanded operations into Oregon, Washington and Arizona. They also installed electronic data processing systems and began offering mortgage insurance and group insurance. Houston served as president and chief executive officer of Golden State until January 1967, when he became chairman of the board and chief executive officer.

== Later years ==
In 1970, Houston's two sons, Norman B. Houston and Ivan J. Houston took over active management of the company. The younger Norman, replaced his father as chairman of the executive committee. Ivan would replace the retiring Edgar J. Johnson as president. However, the elder Houston would still serve in various capacities at Golden State Mutual until his retirement in 1977, after which he was named honorary chairman and chairman emeritus.

== Other business activities ==
Houston also continued to be involved in other business activities. In 1947, he was one of the organizers of Broadway Federal Savings and Loan (later Broadway Federal Bank and served as its chairman of the board for many years. He also was briefly involved in the organization of the National Bank of Los Angeles in 1949, which was the brainchild of H. A. Howard, manager of Broadway Federal.

== Community activities ==
The first African American to be appointed to the California State Athletic Commission, Houston would later serve as chairman of the commission. Los Angeles Mayor Sam Yorty appointed him to the 1976 Olympic Games Committee. Houston was also chairman of the management committee of the 28th YMCA in Los Angeles.

== Death ==
Houston died in Los Angeles on October 20, 1981, just four days after his 88th birthday. In addition to his sons, Houston was survived by his widow, Edythe and a daughter, Elizabeth Jean.
