= West Adams, Los Angeles =

West Adams
- Neighborhood of Los Angeles
- Golden State Mutual Life Insurance Building

- Location in Central Los Angeles
- Coordinates: 34°01′58″N 118°18′03″W
- Country: United States
- State: California
- County: Los Angeles
- Time zone: Pacific
- ZIP Code: 90016
- Area code: 213/323

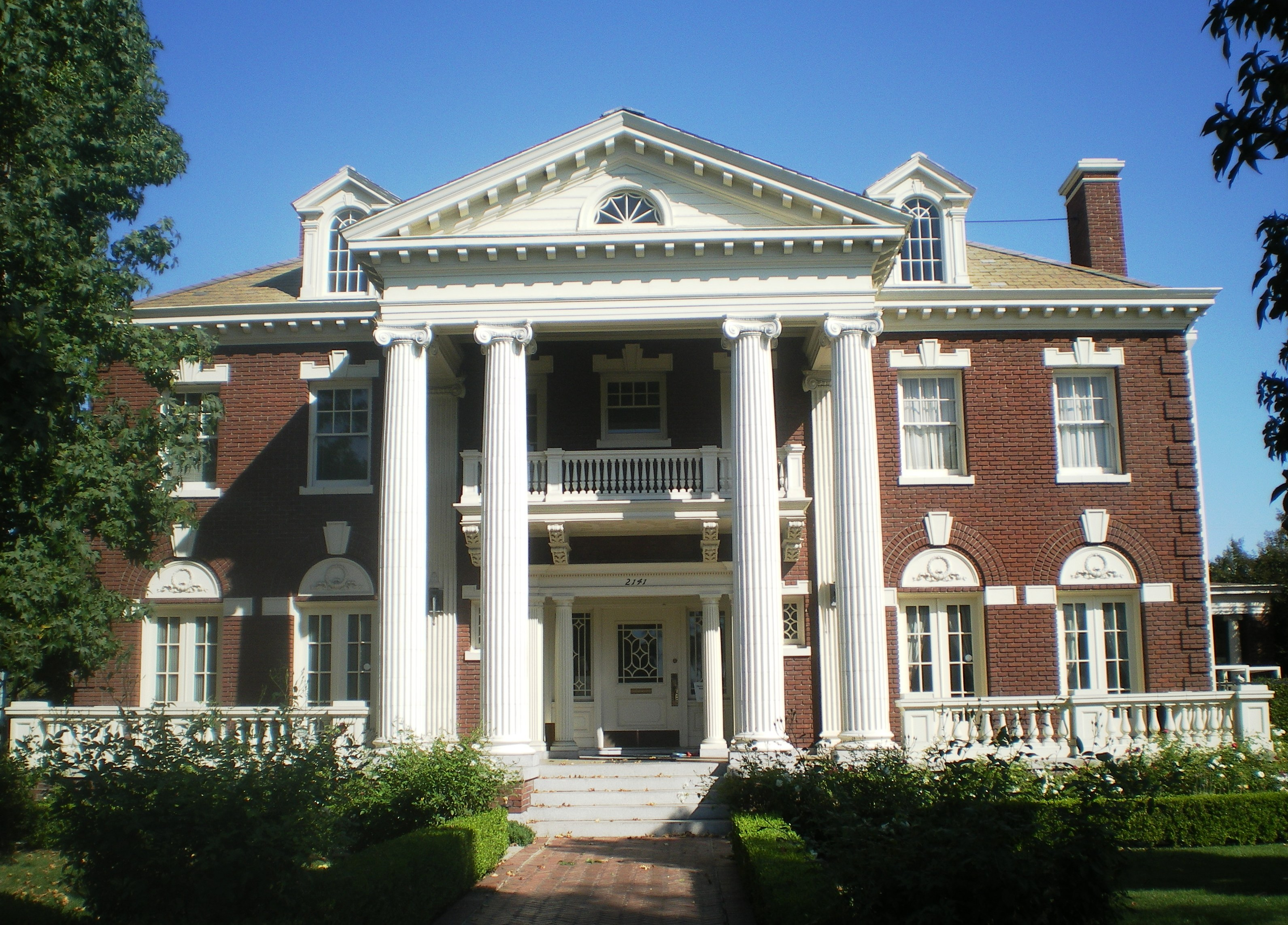
Eugene W. Britt House, now home of the LA84 Foundation

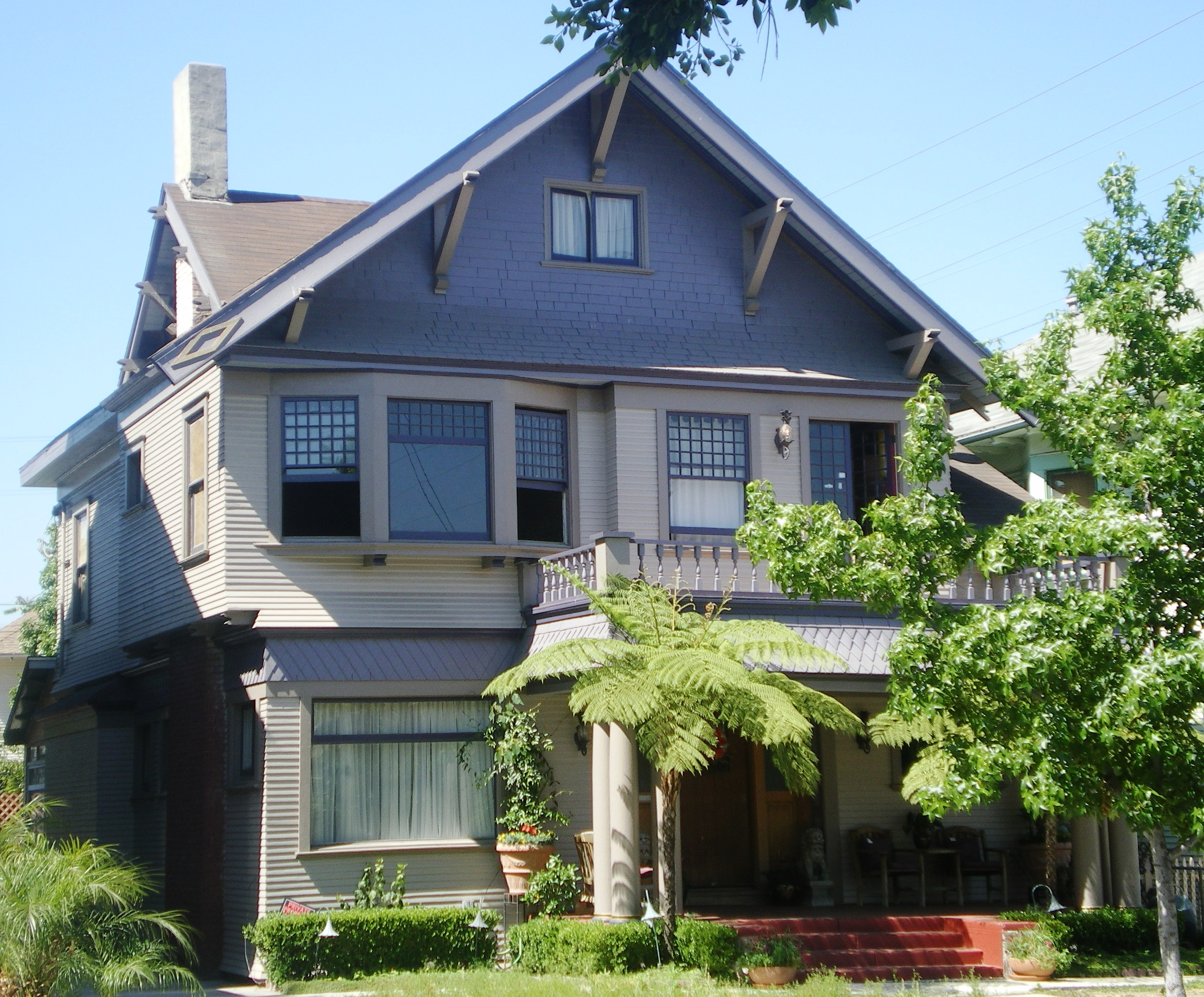
House in 20th Street Historic District

West Adams is a neighborhood in the South Los Angeles region of Los Angeles, California. The neighborhood is known for its large number of historic buildings, structures, notable houses, and mansions. It contains several Historic Preservation Overlay Zones as well as designated historic districts.

== History ==
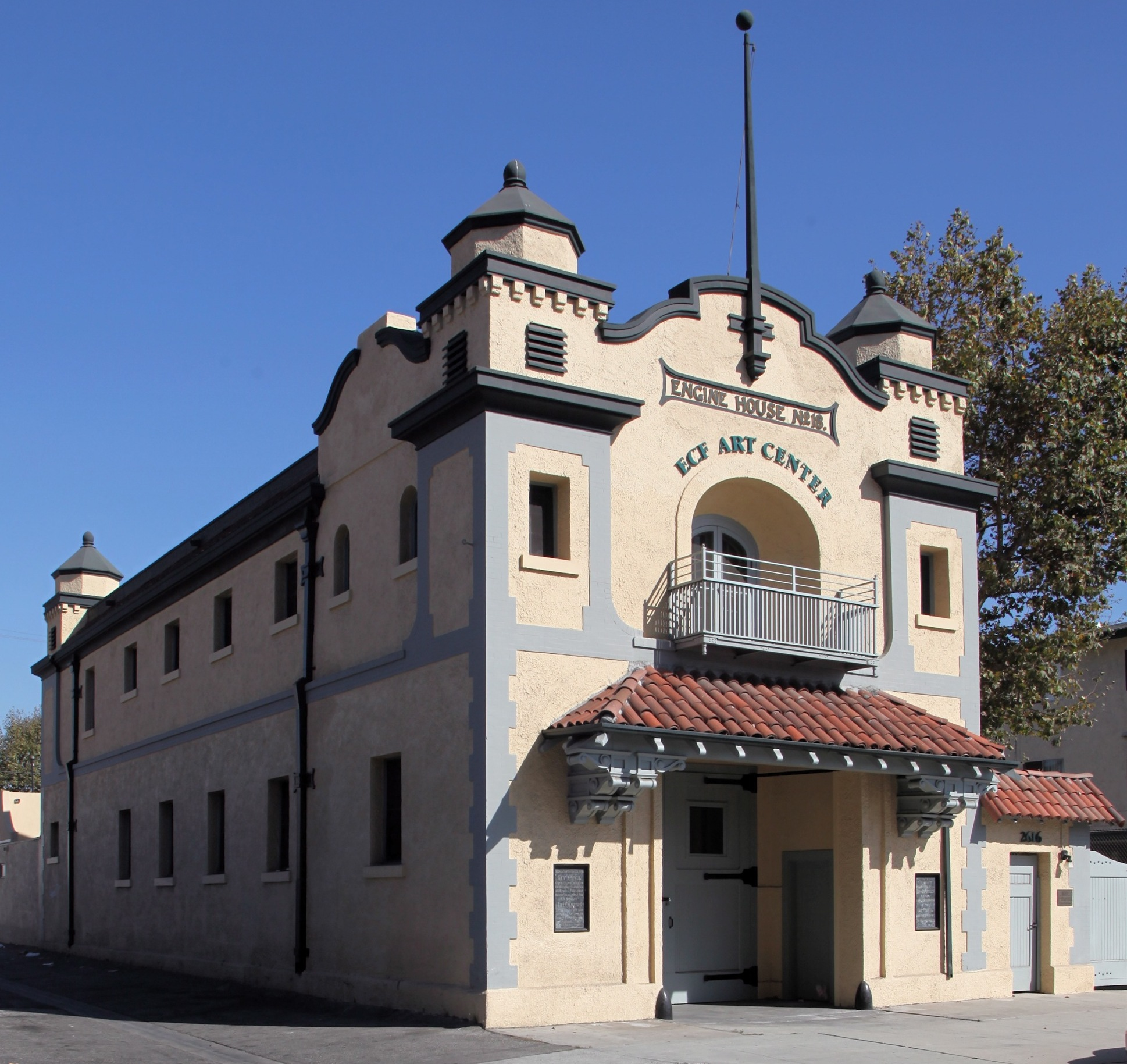
Historic Engine House No. 18, built in a Mission Revival style in 1904.

West Adams is one of the oldest neighborhoods in the city of Los Angeles, with most of its buildings erected between 1880 and 1925, including the William Andrews Clark Memorial Library. West Adams was developed by railroad magnate Henry E. Huntington and wealthy industrialist Hulett C. Merritt of Pasadena. It was once the wealthiest neighborhood in the city, with its Victorian mansions and sturdy Craftsman bungalows, and a home to Downtown businessmen, as well as professors and academicians at the nearby University of Southern California.

=== 1880s - 1890s ===
In 1887, the Los Angeles Herald announced that the ensuing St. James Park neighborhood would have a stone entrance to "rival the Arc de Triomphe" and would be eventually be surrounded by "the most costly residences yet erected on this coast". The parkland was named and donated to the city by George King and his wife in commemoration of their many trips to London. The gated community of Chester Place was developed in 1889 On October 24, 1901, Edward L. Doheny purchased number 8 Chester Place for $120,000 cash.

In 1890, St. Margaret's School for Girls moved from Pasadena to West Adams. On October 1, 1890, the school opened at the corner of 23rd and Scarff Streets. Occupying the empty Marlborough Hotel, the school adopted the name of its new location and was renamed the Marlborough School for Girls. It remained in West Adams for 26 years before relocating to Hancock Park in 1916.

=== 1900s - 1910s ===
In 1906, numerous West Adams residents experienced a water shortage because the new pipe from the Ivanhoe reservoir was not completed on time. The new reservoir would hold nearly "a billion gallons" of water. In September of that year, a Los Angeles Times reporter wrote: "The growing popularity of apartment houses is causing them to encroach on grounds heretofore exclusively reserved for high-class residences". He was reporting on "one of the handsomest apartment-houses in the city", which was designed by Thornton Fitzhue and was to be built on the southern side of St. James Park. . Landowner John R. Powers completed another apartment building in St. James Place in 1909, with an entrance also on Scarff Street. Designed by George W. Wryman, it was divided into four apartments of seven rooms each; the venture represented an investment of $35,000.

By 1912, other wealthy neighborhoods in the Los Angeles area were being developed; tracts were being advertised in the yet-to-be-incorporated Beverly Hills that would "make the dwellers of the West Adams District green with envy".

In 1913, the Times announced that the Monarch Hotel was to be built in the "fashionable residence district" of West Adams. By 1916, the Los Angeles Times stated that the area was "already known for its private parks and handsome homes". At that time, improvements to the boulevard were being spearheaded by five prominent residents including Isidore B. Dockweiler, William May Garland and Edward L. Doheny. After convincing thirty-five other residents to help with funding, the old street paving between Figueroa and Hoover streets was replaced with an asphalt surface. Adams Boulevard was now 65 feet wide with a series of center islands planted with flowers, shrubs and mature palms. Six-cluster electroliers, which were duplicates of those that lined Lake Shore Drive in Chicago, were installed on both sides of Adams Street. Adams Boulevard was now a "magnificent concourse" and "one of the most popular drives in Los Angeles".

=== 1920s - 1930s ===
The Auto Club Building, 1921

In 1921, the Automobile Club announced that it would build a new headquarters at Figueroa and Adams. Architects Sumner Hunt and S.R. Burns designed a building of "attractive Spanish design" that would be a "distinctive structure for the West Adams district".

In 1925, silent screen star Ramon Novarro purchased a home in "the exclusive West Adams district" for $12,000 and spent an additional $100,000 on renovations.

In 1927, during the prohibition era, the Times reported that the vice squad raided a "luxurious fourteen room mansion in the exclusive West Adams district". The mansion, located at 2234 Adams Street, contained "the most extensive and elaborate moonshine production plant" they had seen in many months.

In 1931, during the Great Depression, the recently organized West Adams Relief Committee provided work for twenty men for ninety days. Married men with families who lived in West Adams and were registered voters would be paid $2 a day.

Though West Adams had previously been described as "fashionable" and "exclusive", in 1937 the Times wrote: "St James Place, Chester Place, Scarff Street - those place-names mean little to present day Angelinos. Yet they spell an aristocratic Los Angeles of the past, and to a good extent, the present. They are of the wealthy Los Angeles of a past generation, and a visitor to the neighborhood will find evidence of its elegance, if somewhat frayed and faded in spots."

=== 1940s - 1950s ===
African-Americans began to move in around this time. Notable residents included Golden State Mutual Life Insurance Company president Norman O. Houston, actress Hattie McDaniel, civil rights activists John and Vada Sommerville, actress Louise Beavers, band leader Johnny Otis, performers Pearl Bailey and Ethel Waters.

In December 1945, some white residents filed a lawsuit against 31 Black residents—including Hattie McDaniel. She held workshops to strategize for the case and gathered around 250 sympathizers to accompany her to court. Judge Thurmond Clarke left the courtroom to see the disputed neighborhood and threw out the case the following day. He said, "It is time that members of the Negro race are accorded, without reservations or evasions, the full rights guaranteed them under the 14th Amendment to the Federal Constitution. Judges have been avoiding the real issue too long." McDaniel's case set a precedent that later impacted the 1948 Shelley v. Kramer decision by the U.S. Supreme Court, which held that state courts may not enforce racially restrictive covenants.

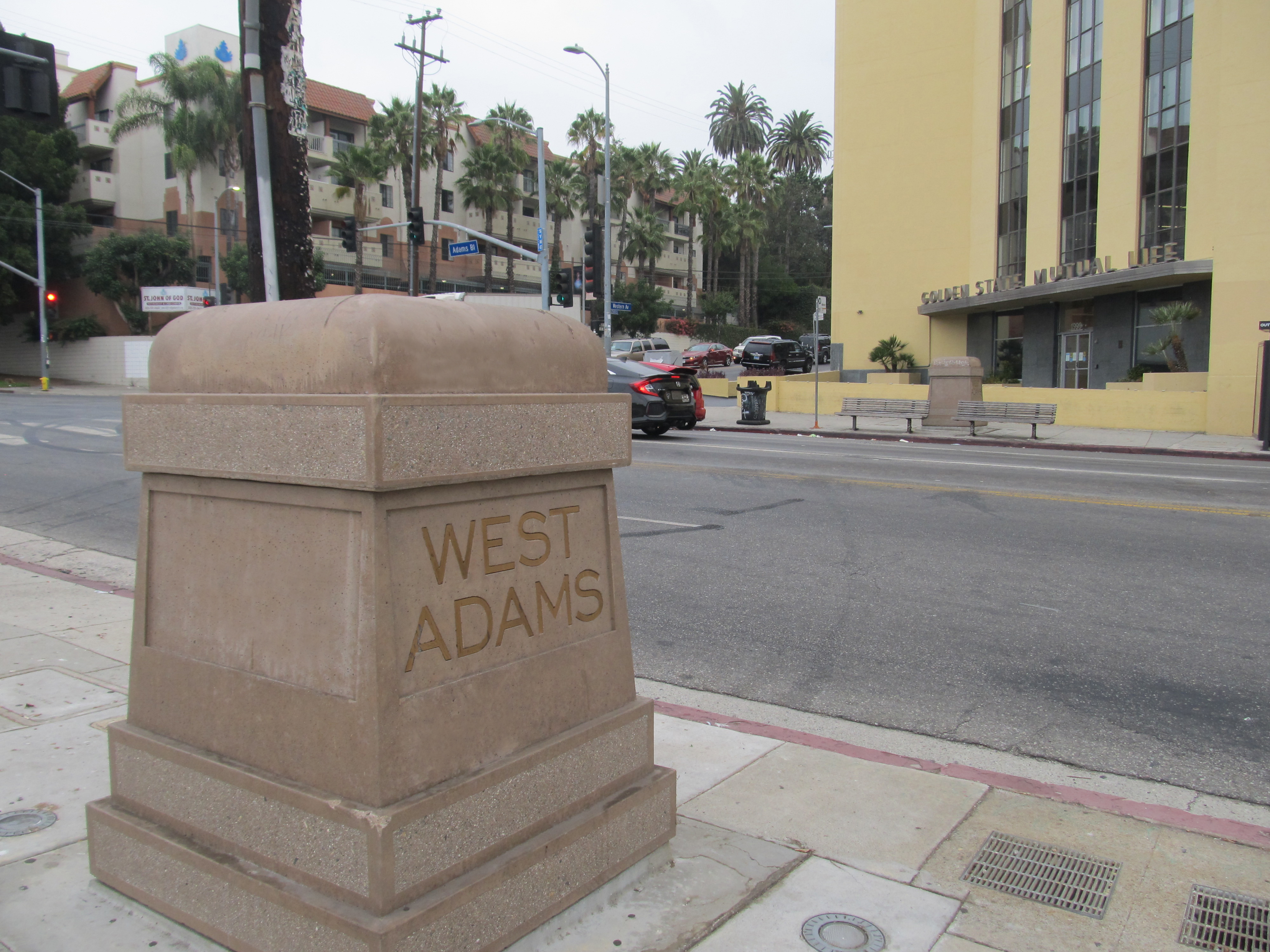
West Adams Gateway Marker, in front of the Golden State Mutual Life Insurance Building

In 1949, the headquarters building of the Golden State Mutual Life Insurance Company opened. It was once described as "the finest building to be erected and owned by African-Americans in the nation." The building is a late-period Moderne structure designed by architect Paul Williams.

=== 1960s - 1970s ===
Starting in 1961, construction of the ten-lane Santa Monica Freeway (Interstate 10) tore through West Adams' core, with the freeway routed east to west just north of Adams Boulevard. Its construction resulted in the taking (by eminent domain) and demolition of numerous West Adams homes, including a number of mansions owned by African Americans. The construction resulted in substantial displacement of West Adams residents, including the relocation of much of the area's affluent Black families. As the Los Angeles Sentinel reported:

The road could have been built without cutting through the so-called Sugar Hill section. However, in order to miss Sugar Hill, it was "said" that the route would have to cut through fraternity and sorority row area around USC. Sorority and fraternity row still stands and Sugar Hill doesn't, so you know who won out!

As in many other American cities during the heyday of Interstate Highway Act construction, interstate highway rights of way were disproportionately routed through predominantly African American communities, causing substantial displacement of residents and steep declines in neighborhood viability.

In 1971, the West Adams Community Hospital opened as the city's first black-owned hospital. Located at 24th Street and Western Avenue, it was considered a landmark in the community. According to the LA Weekly, "In the 1970s and '80s it was a thriving, vital part of the West Adams community." (It later became the Los Angeles Metropolitan Medical Center. It shut down 2013.)

=== 1980s - present day ===
In 2000, the Alpha Gamma Omega sorority house, a Craftsman structure built in 1911 and located in West Adams, received a Preserve L.A. grant from the Getty Trust.

In 2004, homes were demolished and lots were cleared in West Adams for what was then referred to as "Central High School No. 2". The Times reported that "a century-old neighborhood of houses and businesses" were demolished to make room for a new $130 million 15-acre high school. West Adams Preparatory High School opened in the fall semester of 2007 with a final budget of $176 million.

In 2007, the city approved the "West Adams Streetscape Enhancement Program" proposed by LANI (Los Angeles Neighborhood Initiative). Improvements included the installation of four "gateway markers" at the corners of Adams Boulevard and Western Avenue and Adams Boulevard and Vermont Avenue. Additionally, 58 magnolia trees were planted along Adams Boulevard between Western and Vermont Avenues, along with additional trees clustered near the gateway markers.

In 2010, This Old House magazine named West Adams as "one of the country's best neighborhoods for old houses". Criteria included "architectural diversity, craftsmanship of the homes, and the preservation momentum in the area". The magazine noted that West Adams was "once home to Los Angeles's wealthiest 19th-century bankers" and that the neighborhood was best for movie buffs and city life.

In 2011, the Times reported on neighbors pushing back against crime and wrote: "The neighborhood around them at Western Avenue and Adams Boulevard might be blighted, but they are not about to cede to urban ills their graceful streets of century-old bungalows, well-tended lawns and curbside jacarandas and towering palms."

In 2016, then-U.S. Representative (D-Los Angeles) and now Los Angeles Mayor Karen Bass said, "I tour people through the area all the time and they are surprised when they see beautiful homes, because it's not the perception of the neighborhood." That same year, an empty West Adams Hospital was transformed into a temporary art gallery.

== Etymology ==
Over the past hundred years, West Adams has been referred to as "The West Adams District", The West Adams Street District, "The West Adams Historic District", and "Historic West Adams". But its proper name is simply "West Adams". This was clarified in 2003 when the Los Angeles Times stated that "heritage minded residents insist on referring to the Craftsman district as historic West Adams", but, The Times reiterated, "the neighborhood is called West Adams".

== Geography ==
=== The City of Los Angeles ===
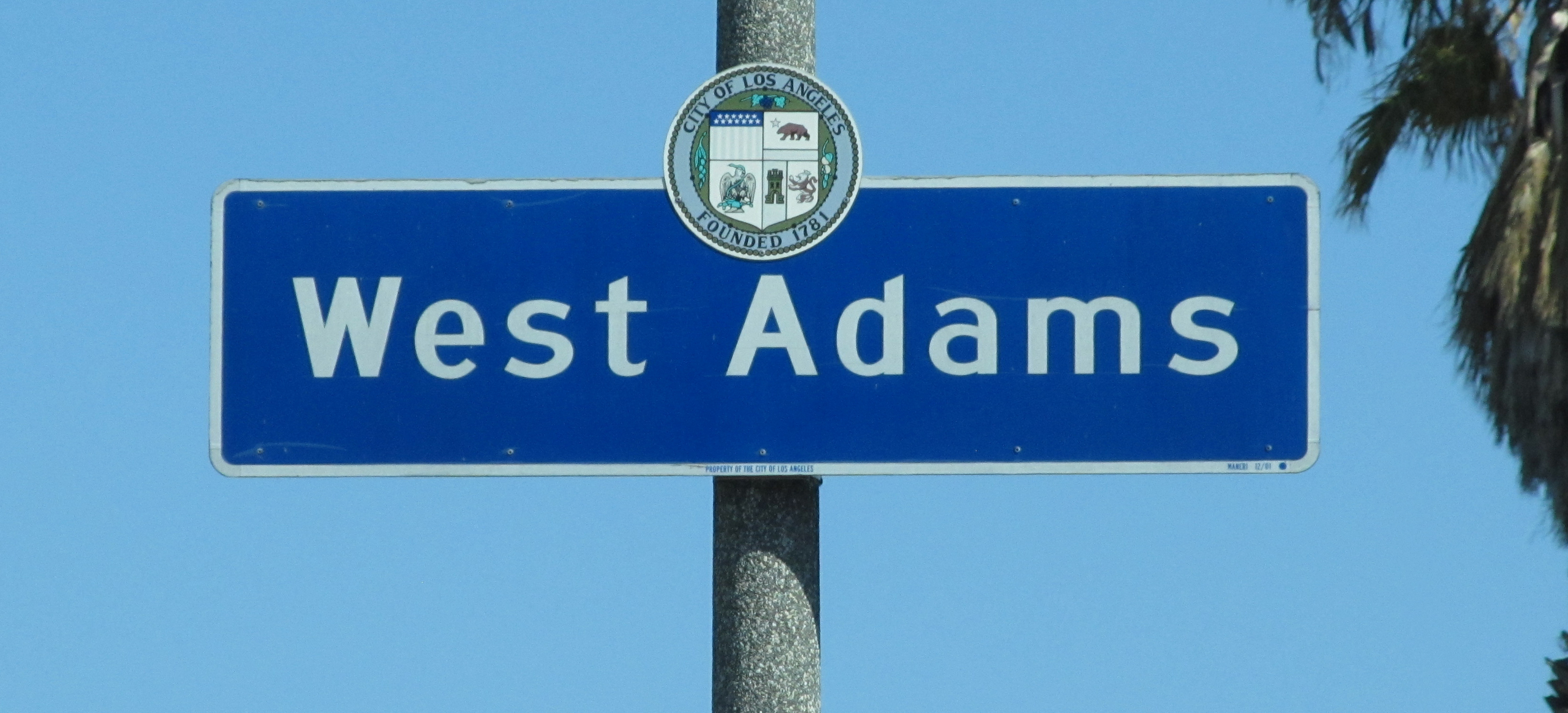
Neighborhood sign at 22nd Street and Western Avenue

Beginning in 2000, the Eighth District Empowerment Congress began working on the "Naming Neighborhoods Project" to identify and name the communities with the neighborhood council area. Through research, a meeting with an urban historian, and numerous community meetings, sixteen neighborhoods, including the neighborhood of West Adams, were submitted to the City Council in October 2001 and approved in February 2002.

At that time, the city was directed to install "West Adams" neighborhood signs on Vermont and Western avenues and Adams Boulevard.

=== Los Angeles Times and other sources ===
According to the Los Angeles Times, West Adams is bounded by Figueroa Street on the east, West Boulevard on the west, Pico Boulevard on the north and Jefferson Boulevard on the south. (Previously, the Times defined West Adams with a slightly smaller boundary: Vermont Avenue on the east, Crenshaw Boulevard on the west, Venice Boulevard on the north, and Jefferson Boulevard on the south.)

The book Images of America - West Adams by Don Lynch, Suzanne Tarbell Cooper, and John Kurtz states that West Adams stretches "roughly from Figueroa Street on the east to West Boulevard on the west, and from Pico Boulevard on the north to Jefferson Boulevard on the south."

== Historic districts ==
More than 70 sites in West Adams have received recognition as a Los Angeles Historic-Cultural Monument, a California Historical Landmark, or listing on the National Register of Historic Places. In recognition of their outstanding architectural heritage, there are several Historic Preservation Overlay Zones within West Adams, including:

(listed in alphabetical order)

- Harvard Heights
- Lafayette Square
- Jefferson Park
- Menlo Avenue-West Twenty-ninth Street Historic District
- North University Park Historic District
- Twentieth Street Historic District
- Van Buren Place Historic District
- Western Heights
- West Adams Terrace

== Communities in West Adams ==
West Adams is home to one of the largest collections of historic houses and small mansions west of the Mississippi River and contains many diverse architectural styles including: Queen Anne, Shingle, Gothic Revival, Transitional Arts and Crafts, American Craftsman/Ultimate Bungalow, Craftsman Bungalow, Colonial Revival, Renaissance Revival, Mediterranean Revival, Spanish Colonial Revival, Mission Revival, Egyptian Revival, Beaux-Arts and Neoclassical styles. West Adams boasts the only existing Greene and Greene house left in the city of Los Angeles.

=== Alphabetical listing of communities with West Adams nexus ===
- Angelus Vista
- Arlington Heights
- Berkeley Square
- Harvard Heights
- Lafayette Square
- Jefferson Park
- North University Park
- Victoria Park
- Wellington Square
- Western Heights
- West Adams Heights
- West Adams Terrace

=== Areas west of West Adams ===
West of West Adams, communities sought to capitalize on their proximity to the "magnificent West Adams district" However, unlike the mansions and large homes east of Crenshaw Boulevard, the homes built in this area were bungalows. They were advertised to people of "moderate means" and were priced to sell for "ten to twenty times" less than homes in West Adams.

In 1911, Carlin Geer Smith, who developed DuRay Place, petitioned the city to annex the "West Adams Extension District", but the city turned down the application.

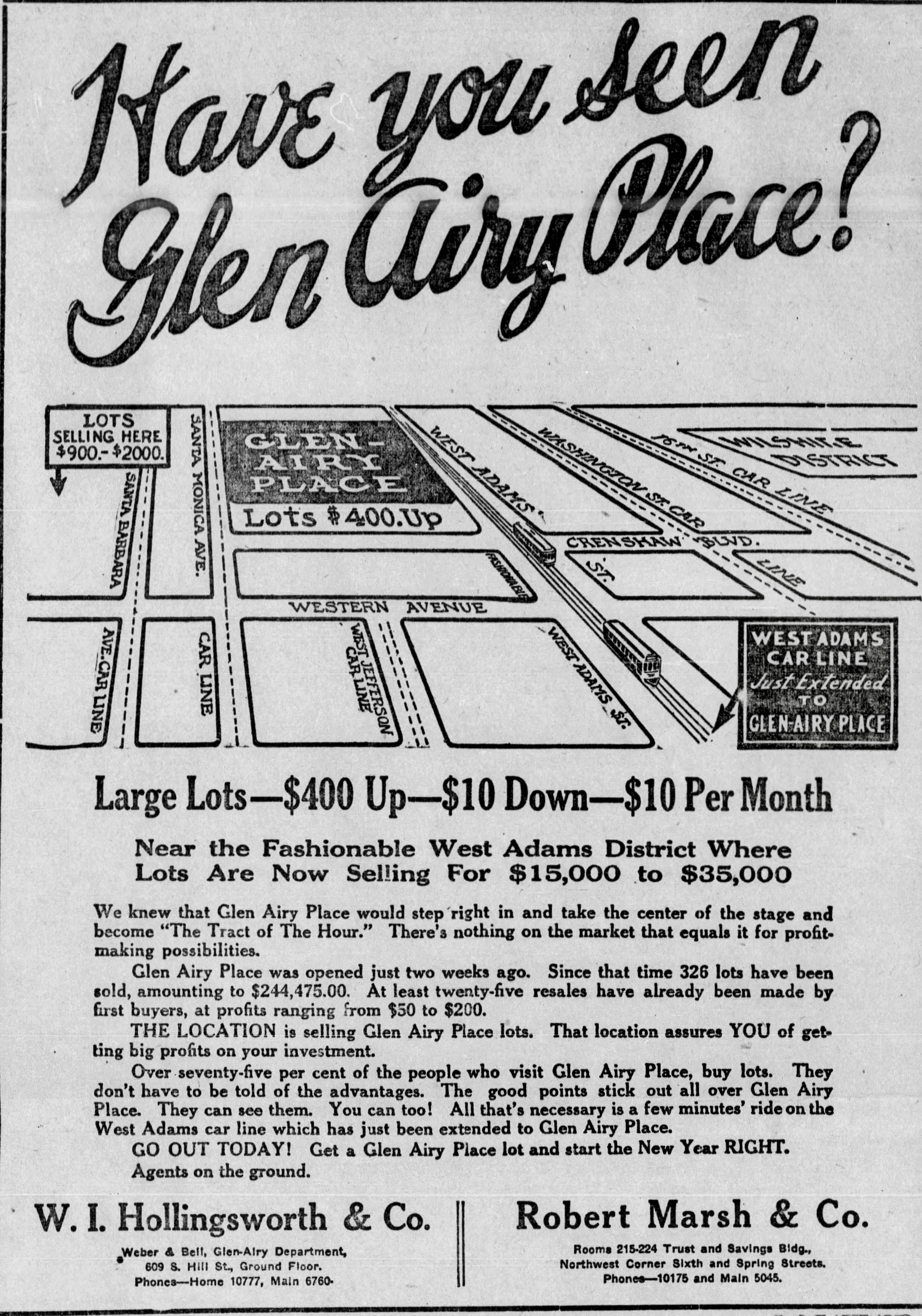
Glen Airy Place, "near the fashionable West Adams District, 1911

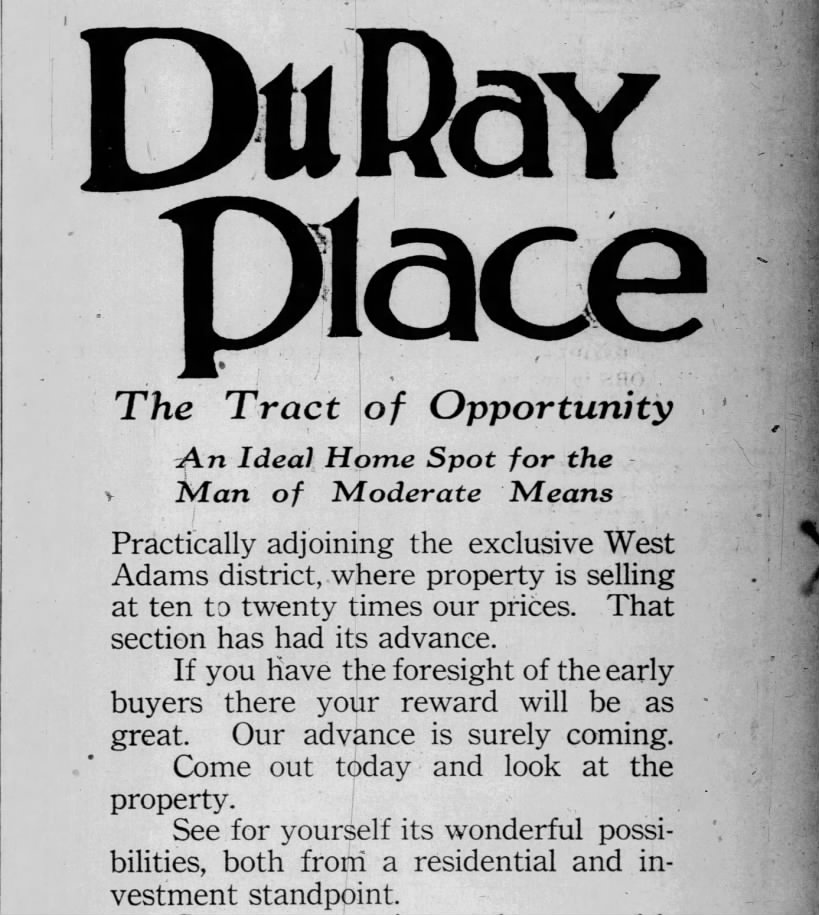
DuRay Place, "practically adjoining the exclusive West Adams District", 1912

Named tracts in this area include:

- Glen Airy Place - Glen Airy Place was a residential subdivision advertised as "near the fashionable West Adams District". An official subdivision map gives the boundaries as Adams Street (now Adams Boulevard) on the north, Vancouver Avenue (now La Brea Avenue) on the east, Roseland Street on the south and Edgemar Street (now Cochran Avenue) on the west.
- DuRay Place - Located near the intersection of Adams Boulevard and Washington Boulevard, DuRay Place was "practically adjoining the exclusive West Adams District, where homes are selling at ten to twenty times our prices." An official subdivision map gives the boundaries as Adams Street on the north, DuRay Place and Dunsmuir Avenue on the east, Jefferson Boulevard on the south and Clyde Avenue on the west.

== Demographics ==
In 1985, West Adams was a predominantly "Black middle-class area with growing Latino and Korean segments, plus a mix of Hungarians, Poles, Japanese, USC students and an increasing young professional and gay population."

In 2007, it was noted that African-American gays were "eschewing the overpriced and completely gentrified territory of West Hollywood" and were instead moving to West Adams.

In 2014, the Times stated that "after a recent wave of Latino immigration", young professionals were purchasing homes in the neighborhoods west of USC, including the "stately Victorian and Craftsman mansions of West Adams" and the "smaller Craftsman bungalows" of Jefferson Park.

According to Mapping L.A., Mexican (29.2%) and Salvadoran (5.7%) were the most common ancestries in 2000. Mexico (37.4%) and El Salvador (25.1%) were the most common foreign places of birth.

== Education ==
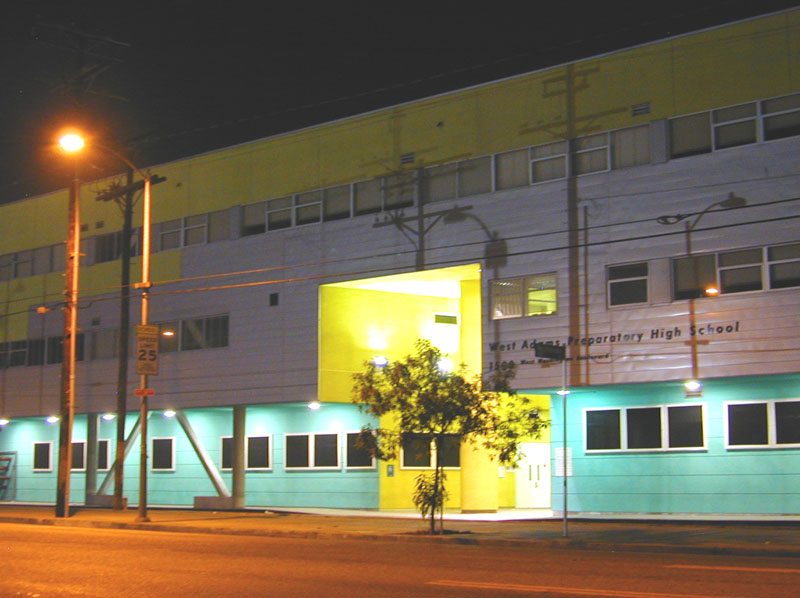
West Adams Preparatory High School

The schools within the West Adams neighborhood include:

- 32nd Street / USC Performing Arts Magnet, LAUSD, 822 W. 32nd St.
- John W. Mack Elementary School, LAUSD, 3020 S. Catalina St.
- Norwood Street Elementary, LAUSD, 2020 Oak St.
- Vermont Avenue Elementary School, LAUSD, 1435 W. 27th St.
- Camino Nuevo Elementary No. 3, Charter, 1723 Cordova St.
- West Adams Preparatory High School, LAUSD, 1500 W. Washington Blvd.

== Recreation and parks ==
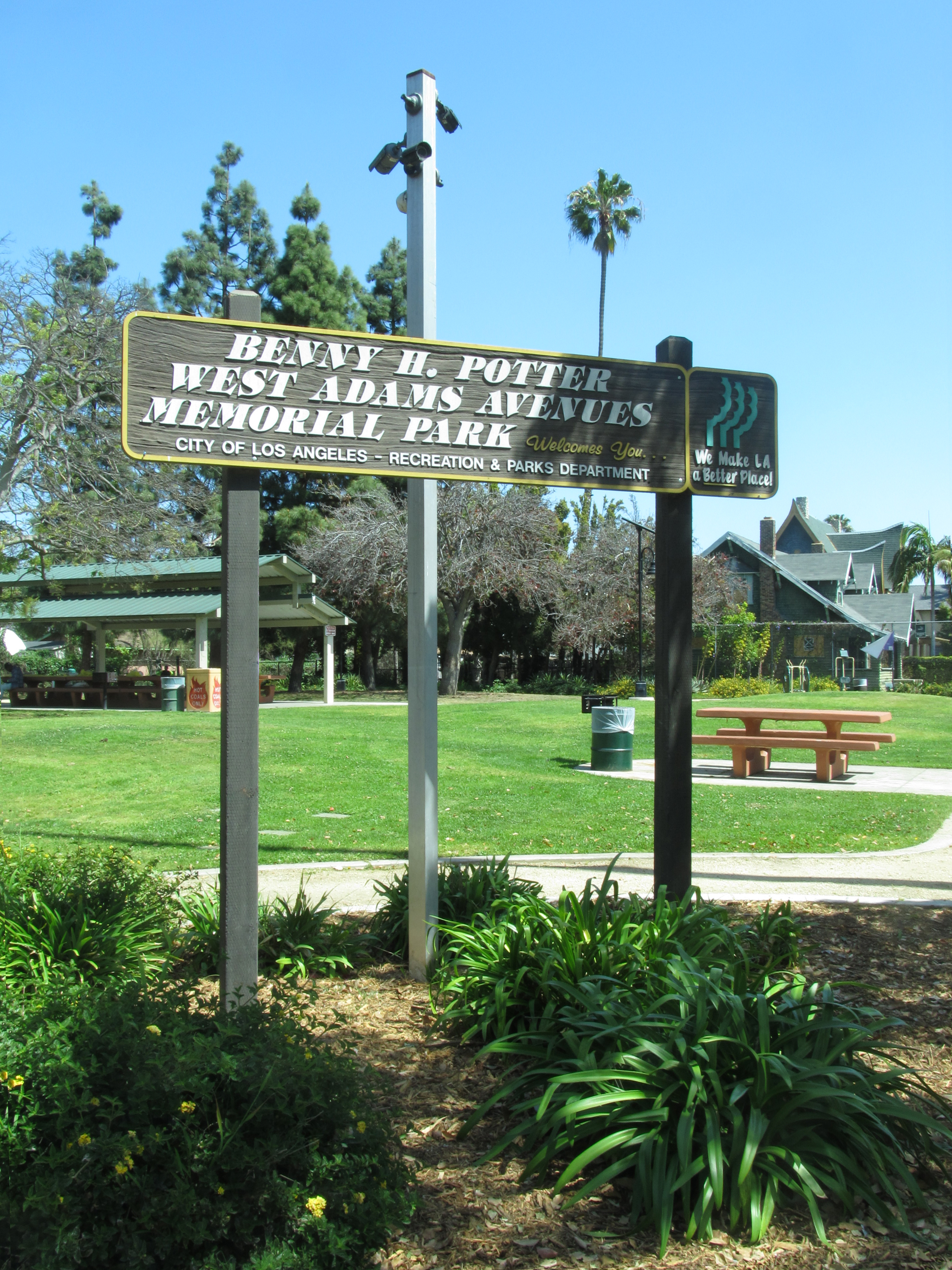
Benny H. Potter West Adams Avenues Memorial Park with the South Seas House (Historic-Cultural Monument #757) on right

- Benny H. Potter West Adams Avenues Memorial Park - 2413 2nd Avenue. Facilities include barbecue pits, outdoor basketball courts, children's play area and picnic tables.
- Loren Miller Recreation Center, 2717 Halldale Avenue
- Richardson Family Park, 2700 S. Budlong Avenue

== Government ==
=== Neighborhood Councils ===
Map of United Neighborhoods of Arlington Heights, West Adams and Jefferson Park Community Neighborhood Council

West Adams is served by multiple neighborhood councils.

- United Neighborhoods of the historic Arlington Heights, West Adams, and Jefferson Park Community Neighborhood Council (West Adams, Arlington Heights, Jefferson Park)
- Empowerment Congress North Area Neighborhood Development Council (West Adams area)
- Mid-City Neighborhood Council (Lafayette Square, Victoria Park and Wellington Square)

=== Fire department ===
West Adams has one fire station in the neighborhood. The Los Angeles Fire Department operates Station 26, located at 2009 S. Western Avenue.

=== Police department ===
Police services in West Adams are provided by the Los Angeles Police Department's Southwest Division.

=== Transportation ===
The Metro E Line runs from Downtown Los Angeles to Santa Monica. Stations in West Adams include: Expo/Vermont and Expo/Western According to the Los Angeles Times, The Vermont/Expo station features "hundreds of photographs of the West Adams district for a 24-panel piece, Neighborhood Portrait: Reconstructed".

== Notable places ==
- Forthmann House – 1102 W. 28th Street. Designated Historic-Cultural Monument 103 on October 4, 1972.
- Frederick Hastings Rindge House - 2263 Harvard Boulevard. Designated Historic-Cultural Monument 95 on February 23, 1972.
- John B. Kane Residence - 2122 Bonsallo Avenue. Designated Historic-Cultural Monument 500 on June 12, 1990.
- Ray Charles Offices and Memorial Library - 2107 Washington Boulevard. Designated Historic-Cultural Monument 776 on January 21, 2004.
- Wilfandel Club - "Located in the Percy H. Clark 1912 Renaissance Revival Style mansion in the West Adams District", the Wilfandel Club was established in 1945.

== Notable people ==
(in alphabetical order)

- Eddie "Rochester" Anderson, actor and comedian
- Pearl Bailey, actress
- Louise Beavers, actress
- Busby Berkley, choreographer
- Ben Carter, actor
- Ray Charles, singer
- Johnnie Cochran, attorney
- Clementina D. Griffin, school principal, aviator
- Lionel Hampton, musician
- Leila Holterhoff, singer, linguist, psychoanalyst
- Norman O. Houston, president of Golden State Mutual Life Insurance Company
- Little Richard, singer
- Joe Louis, boxer
- Hattie McDaniel, actress, the first African-American to win an Academy Award.
- Tim Moore, vaudeville comedian; star of CBS-TV's situation comedy, Amos 'n' Andy.
- Ramon Novarro, silent screen star
- Ivy Pochoda, author
- Ethel Waters, actress

== See also ==
- List of Registered Historic Places in Los Angeles
- List of Los Angeles Historic-Cultural Monuments in South Los Angeles
- South Los Angeles
