= William Nickerson Jr. =

American businessman (1879–1945)

- Born: January 26, 1879 nr.Coldspring, Texas, US
- Died: November 14, 1945 (aged 66)
- Education: Bishop College
- Occupations: Businessman, publisher
- Known for: Founder of Golden State Mutual Life Insurance Company

William Nickerson Jr. (January 26, 1879 – November 14, 1945) was a prominent Los Angeles–based businessman and founder of Golden State Mutual Life Insurance Company, which at one time was the largest black-owned business west of the Mississippi.

== Early life ==
Nickerson was born on a farm near Coldspring in San Jacinto County, Texas, on January 26, 1879, the son of William Nickerson and Emma Poole. After graduating from high school, he attended Bishop College in Marshall, Texas, where he studied economics. Later he received a teacher's certificate at Prairie View Industrial and Normal School (later Prairie View A&M University) in Prairie View, Texas, and subsequently taught public school for four years in San Jacinto County.

== Career ==
On April 15, 1905, a chance encounter would forever change his life. On his way to breakfast, Nickerson passed a well-lit and inviting restaurant. Because of segregation, it was restricted to whites only. Instead, Nickerson was forced to eat in a dimly lit, unsanitary restaurant with poor service that catered to African Americans. He wondered if there were any modern facilities that could be patronized by blacks. His thoughts were interrupted by a man who offered Nickerson the opportunity to become an insurance agent.

Nickerson accepted the job, which was as an underwriter for the Dallas-based Southern Mutual Benefit Association, an insurance company. After a slow, but steady increase in clients, Nickerson became one of the top agents at the company. However, when Southern Mutual was taken over by American National Insurance of Galveston, Texas, this disrupted the firm which prompted Nickerson to consider another career. He took and passed the civil service examination to become a mail carrier. Despite the encouragement of his wife to take advantage of the relative security of civil service, Nickerson instead chose to continue with insurance, which by now had become a passion for him.

Unfortunately, a labor dispute developed between management and the agents at the re-organized company. As a result, Nickerson and several other agents at the firm decided that greater opportunities were to be gained outside of the company. On July 1, 1908, Nickerson left Southern Mutual. Along with J. B. Grisby, Forrest T. Perkins, London Franks, W. H. Parker and C. H. Green, he received a charter from the state of Texas to form the American Mutual Benefit Association. Their offices were located at 409 1/2 Milam Street in Houston, Texas. Nickerson served as secretary of the new company. W. B. Cogle served as president, Perkins as vice president, and Franks as treasurer of American Mutual. Their company aggressively sold "fraternal" insurance to Texas blacks and quickly grew to one of the largest black-owned businesses west of the Mississippi.

In the wake of American Mutual's success, American National sued them because of the similarity in their names and also because they were not operating under the fraternal system as their charter stipulated. As a result, Nickerson and the other officers were called before the insurance commissioner. The night before the meeting, Nickerson drafted a formal ritual for policyholders to comply with the requirement that they be a "lodge" or fraternal order. The Department of Insurance ruled in American Mutual's favor on both counts, but the incident caused Nickerson to re-examine the direction of American Mutual. After extensive research in the law, Nickerson decided that industrial or fraternal insurance schemes were not in the best interests of black insurance firms or their policyholders. Instead, Nickerson advocated the establishment of traditional, whole life insurance policies, but the other officers did not share his enthusiasm.

While still working in his capacity at American Mutual, Nickerson set up a south Texas office for Standard Life Insurance Company of Atlanta, Georgia, an ordinary life insurance company, recently organized by Herman Edward Perry. This provided Nickerson with valuable experience in whole life insurance and also demonstrated to him the advantages of operating in more than one state. However, when he presented his associates at American Mutual with a proposal to open offices in Oklahoma and California, they were indecisive.

Nickerson added publishing to his growing list of enterprises, when he founded the Houston Observer newspaper in 1916. Three years later in a partnership with Clifton H. Richardson and H.F. Edwards established the Informer Publishing Company, which published the Houston Informer newspaper.

In the wake of the Longview, Texas Riots of 1919 (and perhaps the Tulsa race massacre two years later), Nickerson grew concerned about the racial climate in the Southwest. After members of the Ku Klux Klan allegedly burned a cross in front of his home, he finally moved to Los Angeles and established a branch of the American Mutual Benefit Association. While there Nickerson said he needed a "live wire" or someone with local connections to get the new branch off of the ground. That person was Norman O. Houston, a young insurance salesman originally from northern California. Houston was made superintendent of agents, who supervised three young men who were recently hired as agents. This included George A. Beavers Jr., a Georgia-born businessman. Under Nickerson's leadership, the branch prospered.

Despite nearly 40,000 African Americans in California at the time, insurance companies regarded them as either uninsurable or extremely high risk. As a result, the few policies that were written for blacks were done so at exorbitant rates. Nickerson shared his outrage over this blatantly racist policy with Houston and Beavers. In November 1924, when American Mutual chose not to renew its contract with Nickerson, he decided to form his own company. However, the road to starting his own insurance company would not be easy.

To obtain a charter from the state of California, Nickerson needed to secure a $15,000 guarantee fund and obtain applicants for five hundred pre-paid life insurance policies that he could not promise to issue. He consulted an attorney, who said he had the solution to his problem, but for a $1,500 fee. Paying the fee was not a viable option, so Nickerson instead invested $27 for a set of law books. For several days, Nickerson studied the intricacies of insurance regulations to uncover a law that was sufficiently flexible to accommodate his situation.

The resourceful Nickerson found a loophole in the law that would solve his problem. He proposed to the Department of Insurance, that he would issue "certificates of contribution" to his subscribers instead of stock certificates, which were not allowed for a mutual company. This had never been done before. While there was no law specifically authorizing it, there was also no law forbidding it. With the assistance of an actuary named John H. Upton, the California Department of Insurance approved the plan.

However, several additional hurdles had to be overcome including a move by the California Legislature to increase the financial requirements for a mutual life insurance company. Nickerson met every challenge and on February 24, 1925, the articles of incorporation were filed for the Golden State Guarantee Fund Insurance Company. Starting in a small one-room office at 1435 Central Avenue, the initial officers of Golden State were Nickerson (president), Beavers (vice president) and Houston (secretary/treasurer).

Under Nickerson's leadership, the firm expanded throughout California, Texas and Illinois. By the time of his death in 1945, the company, now known as Golden State Mutual Life Insurance Company was the seventh largest black insurance firm in the United States and the largest black-owned business west of the Mississippi.

The Political Graveyard shows that William Nickerson Jr. was a candidate for presidential elector on the Republican ticket of Dewey-Bricker in 1944.

== Death ==
Nickerson died from pneumonia complicated by a heart condition. He was 66 years old.

== Personal ==
In 1906, Nickerson married the former Bertha B. Benton of Carthage, Texas. There were eight children born to this union, seven of which survived him. After Nickerson's death, his widow served on Golden State Mutual's executive board until 1971. She died in 1973. Eloise Nickerson Ford, his last surviving child, died on August 21, 2010, at the age of 95.

== Legacy ==
The Nickerson Gardens housing development in Los Angeles is named after him.
