= George A. Beavers Jr. =

American businessman (1891–1989)

- Born: George Allen Beavers Jr. October 30, 1891; Atlanta, Georgia, US
- Died: October 12, 1989 (aged 97); Los Angeles, California
- Occupation: Businessman
- Years active: 1925–1966
- Known for: Board Chairman of Golden State Mutual Life Insurance Company and President of the National Insurance Association

George A. Beavers Jr. (October 30, 1891 – October 12, 1989) was the board chairman of Golden State Mutual Life Insurance Company, which at one time was the largest black-owned business west of the Mississippi.

== Early years ==
George Allen Beavers Jr. was born to a poor family in Atlanta, Georgia. At the age of 12, Beavers moved with his family to California, where his father got a job with the Pacific Electric Railroad. During his summer vacations from Los Angeles High School, the younger Beavers would work for the railroad as a water boy. He graduated from high school, got married in 1911 and took a job at the German-American Bank (later Security Pacific National Bank) as an elevator operator. He was later promoted to stock clerk and then messenger at the firm. During World War I, Beavers worked at the Los Angeles Foundry as a molder's helper. He was exempt from military service due to the loss of an eye as a teenager.

== Business career ==
A major activity for Beavers at this time was helping to establish the People's Independent Church of Christ. Led by entrepreneur and real estate broker J. H. Shackleford, the church was founded in 1915 and located at 1025 East 18th Street in Los Angeles. Shackleford became chairman of the board of trustees and Beavers served as acting secretary. Through his affiliations with Shackleford and the church, Beavers began selling real estate at G. W. Wheatley Real Estate.

In the early 1920s, William Nickerson Jr., an insurance salesman who had recently opened the Los Angeles branch of the Texas-based American Mutual Benefit Association, approached the congregation of the People's Church and after much discussion, convinced many of its members to purchase insurance. Presumably, it was at this time that Beavers first encountered Nickerson. In 1922, after Beavers had purchased an insurance policy with American Mutual, he joined their sales team on a part-time basis. The following year, when their superintendent of agents Norman O. Houston left the firm to join Liberty Building and Loan Association, Beavers assumed his position with the company.

=== Golden State Mutual Life Insurance Company ===
In November 1924, when Nickerson's contract with American Mutual was not renewed, he asked Beavers to join him along with Houston, to run the Golden State Mutual Life Insurance Company. At the time, there was little or no insurance available for the roughly 16,000 African Americans living in Los Angeles.

To help meet state requirements to form a corporation, Nickerson assigned Beavers with the task of securing 500 clients who were willing to pay their premiums in advance. Beavers became the vice president of the new corporation with Nickerson as president and Houston as secretary/treasurer. They started in a small, one-room office on 1435 South Central Avenue.

While the company flourished, Beavers, as did Nickerson and Houston, also became a community leader. He was recognized for community service by presidents Franklin Delano Roosevelt and Harry S. Truman and by Los Angeles mayors spanning Fletcher Bowron to Tom Bradley. He's also the recipient of the 1959 Gold Award presented by the George Washington Carver Institute.

When founder William Nickerson Jr. died in 1945, Beavers became chairman of the board. In 1962, he was elected President of the National Insurance Association, a trade organization representing 48 black-owned insurance companies.

Beavers served as board chairman of Golden State until 1966, when he resigned from the position citing health reasons.

== Later years ==
Beavers was a Brother of the Phi Beta Sigma fraternity.

Beavers died in Los Angeles on October 12, 1989. At the time of his death, Golden State Mutual Life Insurance Company was the third largest black insurance company with offices in 22 states and the District of Columbia.
