= William Mead Homes =

Housing development in Los Angeles, California, United States

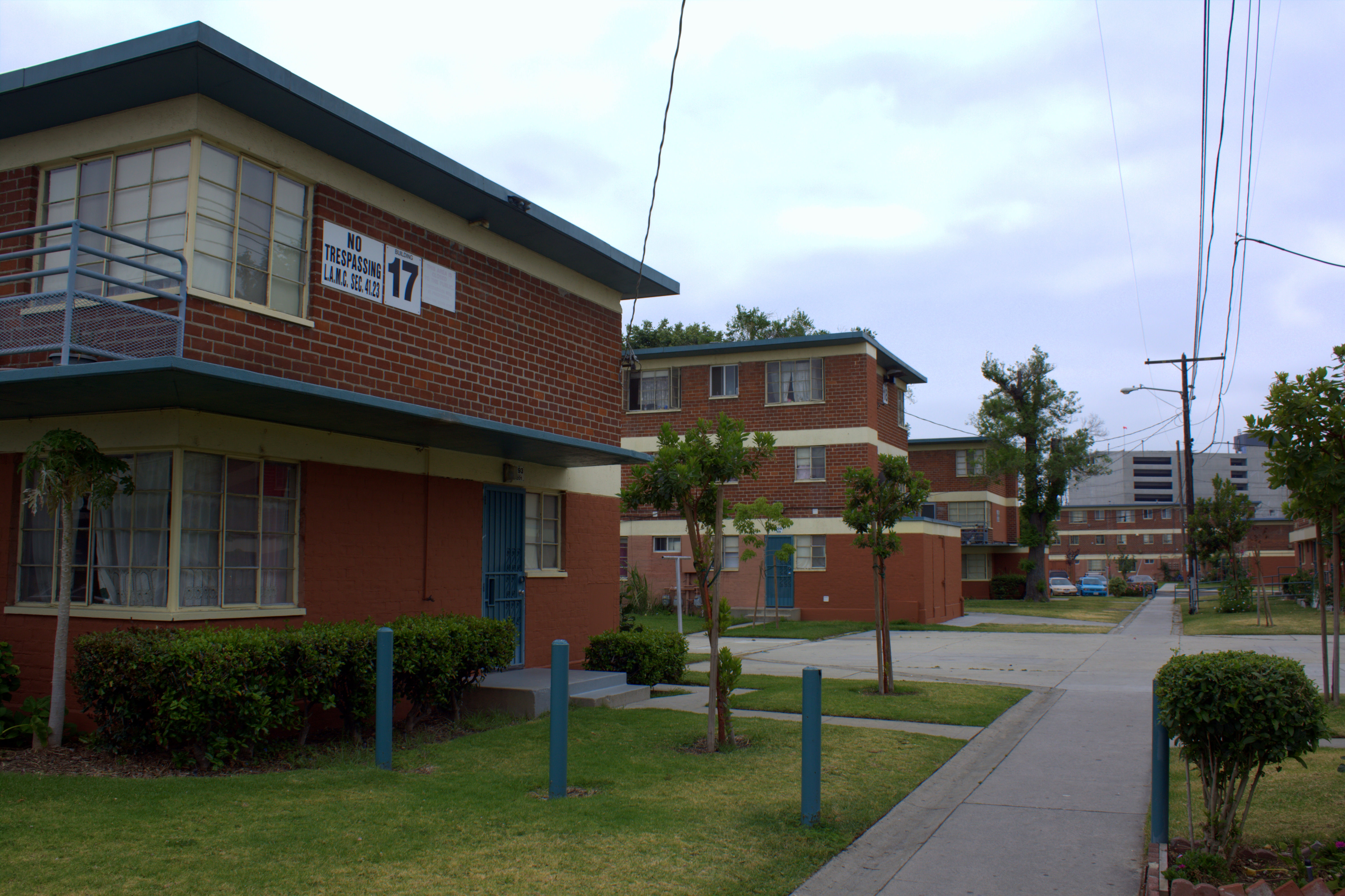
- Interactive map of William Mead Homes

General information
- Location: Los Angeles, California
- Coordinates: 34.064232°N 118.229805°W
- Status: completed

Construction
- Constructed: 1942

Other information
- Governing body: Housing Authority of the City of Los Angeles

William Mead Homes is a public housing development located near Chinatown, a neighborhood of the city of Los Angeles. Nicknamed "Dogtown" because of its proximity to the historic Ann Street Animal Shelter whose canine residents could be heard for blocks around, it is operated by the Housing Authority of the City of Los Angeles.

== History ==
The site was funded with the federal Housing Act of 1937. The proposal to build the site was rejected in December 1940 because of high land purchase costs (averaging $23,900 per acre, when other developments were as low as $2400). 8 acres (3.2 ha) was owned by the Consolidated Steel Corporation. The remaining property was on land bequeathed by William Mead, an early Los Angeles politician.

The land price was reduced to $20,000 an acre by January 1941, but didn't proceed until a federally-backed United States Housing Authority loan signed by Franklin D. Roosevelt was given on March 12, 1941.

The housing project was built in 1941-1942 and contains 449 units in 24 buildings, replacing approximately 100 substandard dwellings on the site. It occupies 15.2 acres (6.2 ha) and was constructed by the Herbert M. Baruch Corporation for $1.2 million. David Gebhard and Robert Winter state the details "slightly suggest the late 1930s Moderne."

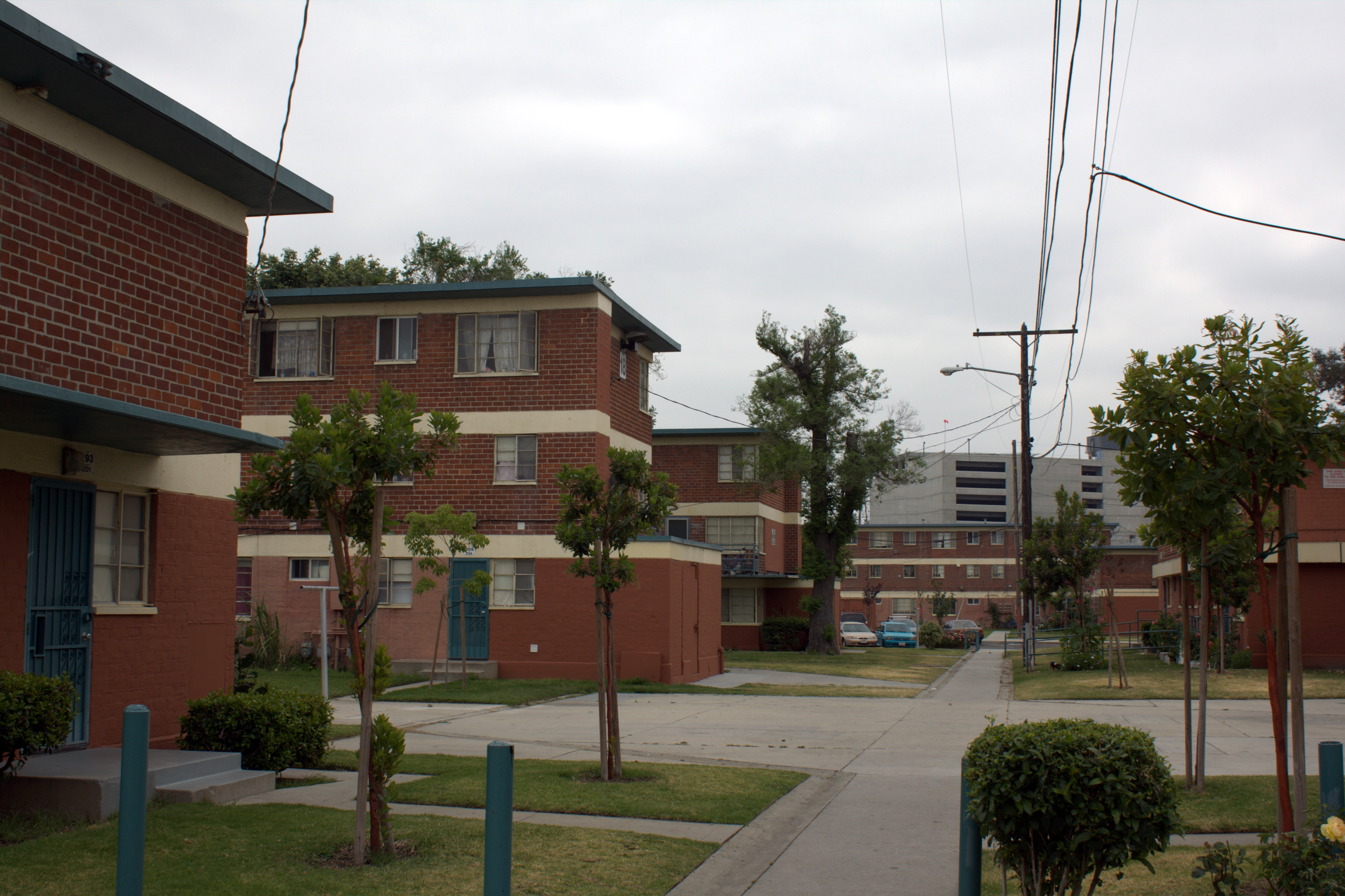
William Mead Homes

Residency in the project was limited to low-income American citizens who had lived in Los Angeles for at least a year. It was also part of a "Negro quota" system, which mandated a maximum of 7 percent black occupancy. This changed to 15% in January 1943, and was completely removed in July 1943 after pressure and protests by the National Urban League, California Eagle, Los Angeles Sentinel, NAACP, and the CIO union. The development was opened for war workers in March 1943.

Part of the project was built on an oil refinery and a hazardous waste dump. In 1994, cancer-causing polycyclic aromatic hydrocarbons were found at levels 19 times the safe level following testing by the California Department of Toxic Substances Control. Playgrounds and gardening spaces were closed, and a $1.5 million soil removal and cleanup project was required in 2000. The refinery was operated by Amalgamated Oil Company, which was later purchased by Texaco. The waste dump was operated by Witco Corporation, now part of the Chemtura Corporation. At the time, the project was home to 1400 residents, many Latino and Vietnamese. The Housing Authority sued ChevronTexaco for the cleanup costs in April 2003.

== Demographics ==
In 1992, the population was 71 percent Latino, 22 percent Asian, 4 percent African-American and 1 percent Caucasian, with a median monthly family income of $840.

Several innovative welfare-to-work programs occurred, such as the Jobs-Plus program, which was at William Mead and Imperial Courts from 1996 to 2002.

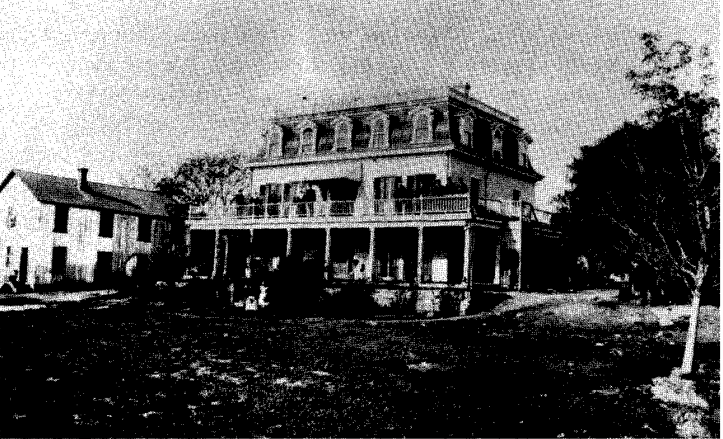
Los Angeles Infirmary

In 1856 the Daughters of Charity of St. Vincent de Paul founded the city's first orphanage, Institución Caratitiva, in the former residence of a former mayor, Benjamin Davis Wilson. The order then opened the Los Angeles Infirmary in 1858. In 1870 they moved the infirmary to a new structure built in what became Dogtown at Naud and Ann Street (named after the orphanage's supervisor, Sister Ann Gillen). Rail arrived a few years later and suddenly the location seemed less than ideal for an infirmary and the decision was made to relocate. Between 1883 and '86 they sold lots of the New Depot Tract and Infirmary Tract to raise money for a new home. In 1891, the sisters moved their operations to Boyle Heights

== Geography ==
William Mead Homes is located close to the Chinatown neighborhood of Los Angeles. The housing complex is next to two government facilities, the Twin Towers Correctional Facility and the LADWP Main Street Center. Nearby neighborhoods: To the south is Chinatown, to the northeast is Cypress Park, to the east is Lincoln Heights, to the southwest is Boyle Heights, and to the west is Downtown Los Angeles.

== In popular culture ==
The William Mead Homes has appeared in a number of films and music videos over the years, these include:

- 1963 movie comedy Critic's Choice starring Bob Hope and Lucille Ball
- 1997 Crime Drama One Eight Seven starring Samuel L. Jackson
- CBS crime drama Cold Case in the episode "Saving Patrick Bubley"
- The music video for Don't Be So Hard on Yourself by Jess Glynne
- 2009's Janky Promoters starring Ice Cube and Mike Epps
- Bruno Mars 2010 Grenade (song) music video
- 2008 action thriller film Street Kings starring Keanu Reeves
- The music video for John Muir by Schoolboy Q
- Episode "Lockdown" in season 3 of The Rookie
- 1990 Comedy Film House Party as Sharane's home
- 2017 The New Edition Story was also filmed there as group's home during their early childhoods
