= Frank Rader =

American politician

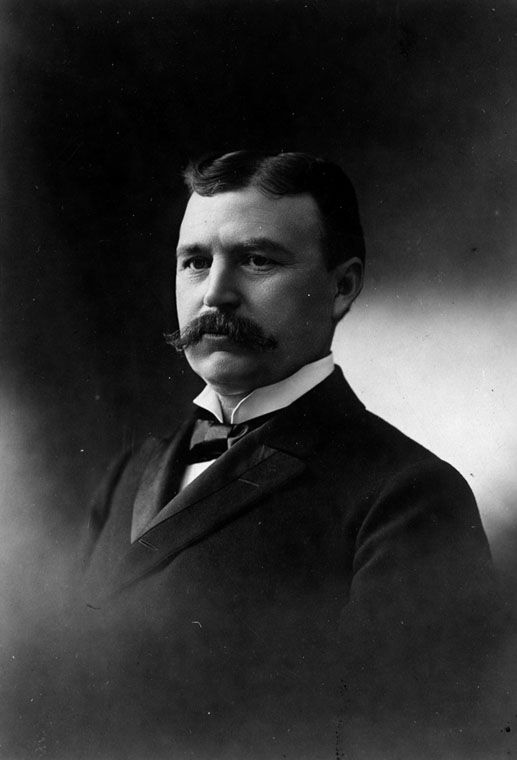
- Portrait of Frank Rader

22nd Mayor of Los Angeles
- In office December 12, 1894 – December 16, 1896
- Preceded by: Thomas E. Rowan
- Succeeded by: Meredith P. Snyder

Personal details
- Born: April 8, 1848 Easton, Pennsylvania
- Died: March 28, 1897 (aged 48) Lake Elsinore, California
- Party: Republican
- Spouse(s): Genie Finch (m. 1877); Clara Dewey (m. 1880)

Frank Rader (April 8, 1848 – March 28, 1897) served as the 22nd Mayor of Los Angeles from 1894 until 1896.

He was born in Easton, Pennsylvania, and settled in Clyde, Ohio with his siblings around 1870s to 1880s before he relocated to California. Rader moved to Los Angeles in 1883 as a banker including the organization of Southern California National Bank and real estate.

He died at age 49 in Lake Elsinore, California.
