= National Insurance Association =

- Formation: 1921
- Headquarters: Durham, North Carolina
- Location: United States
- Members: African American Insurance Companies
- Official language: English

The National Insurance Association (NIA) is the largest organization representing African American owned and operated insurance companies.

== History ==
In 1921, 60 men representing 13 African American owned insurance companies met at the home office of North Carolina Mutual Life Insurance Company in Durham, North Carolina to found the National Negro Insurance Association. C. C. Spaulding was elected the organization's first president.

In the 1948, the name of the organization was changed to the National Insurance Association.

Past presidents of the organization include Theodore A. Jones, former director of the Illinois Department of Revenue and George A. Beavers Jr., board chairman of the Golden State Mutual Life Insurance Company.
