= Clementina D. Griffin =

American educator (1886–1980)

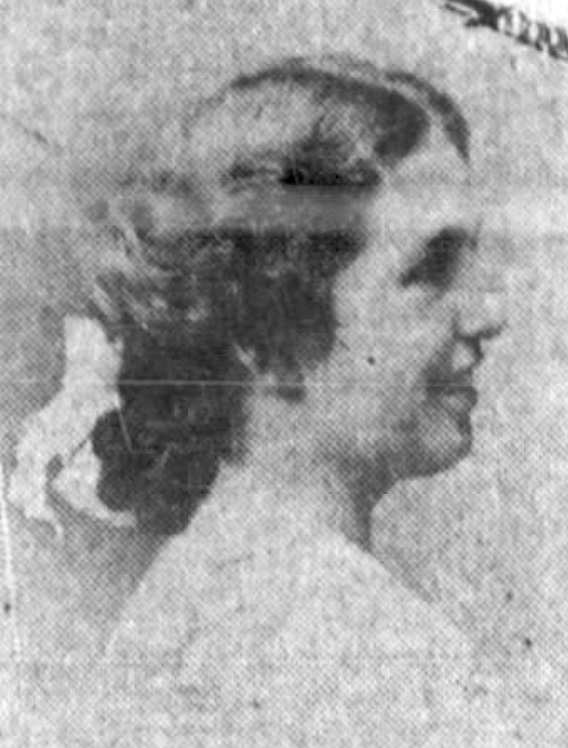
- Clementina Griffin, from a 1907 newspaper.
- Born: Clementina de Forest Griffin; September 7, 1886; Los Angeles, California, US
- Died: April 1, 1980 (aged 93); Santa Ana, California
- Resting place: San Gabriel Mission Cemetery
- Education: Vassar College (A.B.); University of Southern California (M.A.)
- Occupations: Educator, school administrator
- Relatives: Zebulon Butler (great-great-grandfather); Mack Stengler (brother-in-law); Bebe Daniels (niece)

Clementina de Forest Griffin (September 7, 1886 – April 1, 1980) was an American educator, school administrator, and aeronautical enthusiast based in Los Angeles. She took an active interest in aviation, aeronautics, and astronomy.

== Early life ==
Clementina Griffin was born in Los Angeles, the daughter of George Butler Griffin and Eva Guadalupe de la Plaza Griffin. Her mother and at least two of her older sisters were born in Colombia. Her father, a lawyer, civil engineer, writer, diplomat, and great-grandson of Zebulon Butler, died in 1895.

Griffin attended Los Angeles High School, where she was captain of the girls' basketball team, and graduated from Vassar College in 1909. She was a member of Vassar's hockey and basketball teams, and president of the Vassar Athletic Association. She earned a master's degree at the University of Southern California, with a thesis titled "Poverty Among the Mexicans in Los Angeles."

In 1938, she received a second Master of Arts degree in sociology from the University of Southern California for her thesis A sociological study of fifty-two senior boys: The products of a junior-senior high school, while working at Narbonne High School.

Actress Bebe Daniels was Griffin's niece. Cinematographer Mack Stengler was her brother-in-law.

== Career ==
=== Education ===
Griffin was a settlement worker at the Brownson House Settlement in Los Angeles in the 1910s, starting and supervising clubs for women, boys, and girls. In 1920, she wrote about Catholic welfare work with immigrants in Los Angeles, including medical and psychological examinations, for the National Catholic War Council Bulletin.

From 1925 to 1938, Griffin was the inaugural principal of Narbonne High School in Lomita. In 1938 and 1939, she was principal at Venice High School. In 1941, Griffin was principal at Canoga Park High School. In 1942, she sued the city school board because she was demoted from principal to teacher, with the corresponding decrease in salary.

Griffin also ran the Foothill School for Girls, an outdoor school based in La Cañada, with her Vassar classmate Ellinor Dewey. She was active in the Women's University Club in Los Angeles. As the chairperson of the legislative committee of the Los Angeles branch of the American Association of University Women, Griffin protest the fact that the Los Angeles Municipal Courts prohibited women from taking the examination that would allow them to become court clerks.

=== Astronomy, aviation and aeronautics ===
Griffin had an abiding interest in astronomy and aeronautics. In 1910, she was one of a small group of women who attended the fourth conference of the International Union for Cooperation in Solar Research, held at Mount Wilson Observatory (she was listed as being affiliated with Mount Wilson, and may have been a computer, as the other women were at the time).

In 1935, to better acquaint herself with the growing field of aircraft mechanics, she spent her summer vacation taking a six-week course at Curtiss-Wright Technical Institute, the only woman in her class. "I want to be able to answer intelligently when the boys and girls ask me about preparing to enter aeronautics," she explained. She learned to fly a plane the following year, at age 50, "just because I wanted to." In 1941, she described her first parachute jump for the Venice High School yearbook. In 1950, she was president of the Los Angeles chapter of the Women's International Association of Aeronautics. To preserve the history of women in aviation during the early and middle twentieth century, Griffin donate the records of the Women's International Association of Aeronautics records (1920-1958) to the University of California in 1965. Griffin contributed articles for the National Aeronautical Association Magazine.

== Personal life ==
Griffin lived in Hermosa Beach and later in the West Adams neighborhood of Los Angeles with her mother and sisters. She sold that house in the 1960s and died in 1980 in Santa Ana, aged 93 years.
