= Thomas E. Rowan =

American politician (1842–1901)

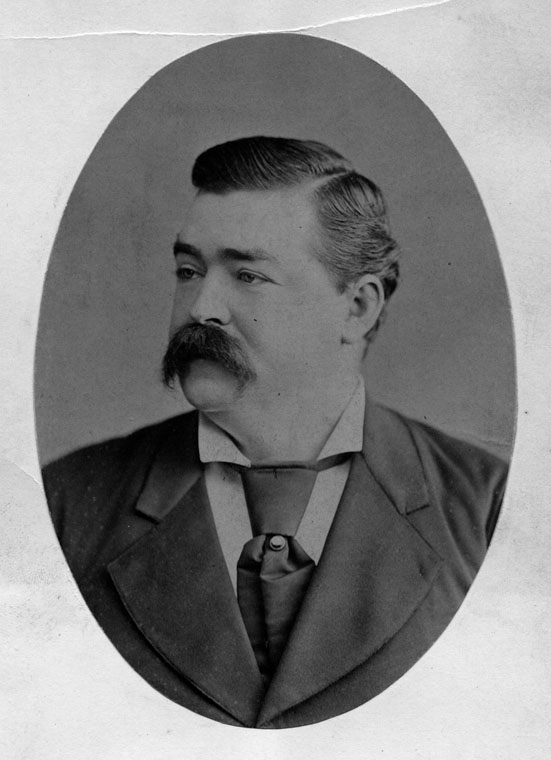
- Portrait of Thomas E. Rowan (undated)

21st Mayor of Los Angeles
- In office December 12, 1892 – December 12, 1894
- Preceded by: William H. Bonsall (acting)
- Succeeded by: Frank Rader

Personal details
- Born: 1842 New York
- Died: 1901 (aged 58–59) Los Angeles, California

Thomas E. Rowan (1842–1901) served as the 21st Mayor of Los Angeles from 1892 until 1894.
