= Wilfandel Club =

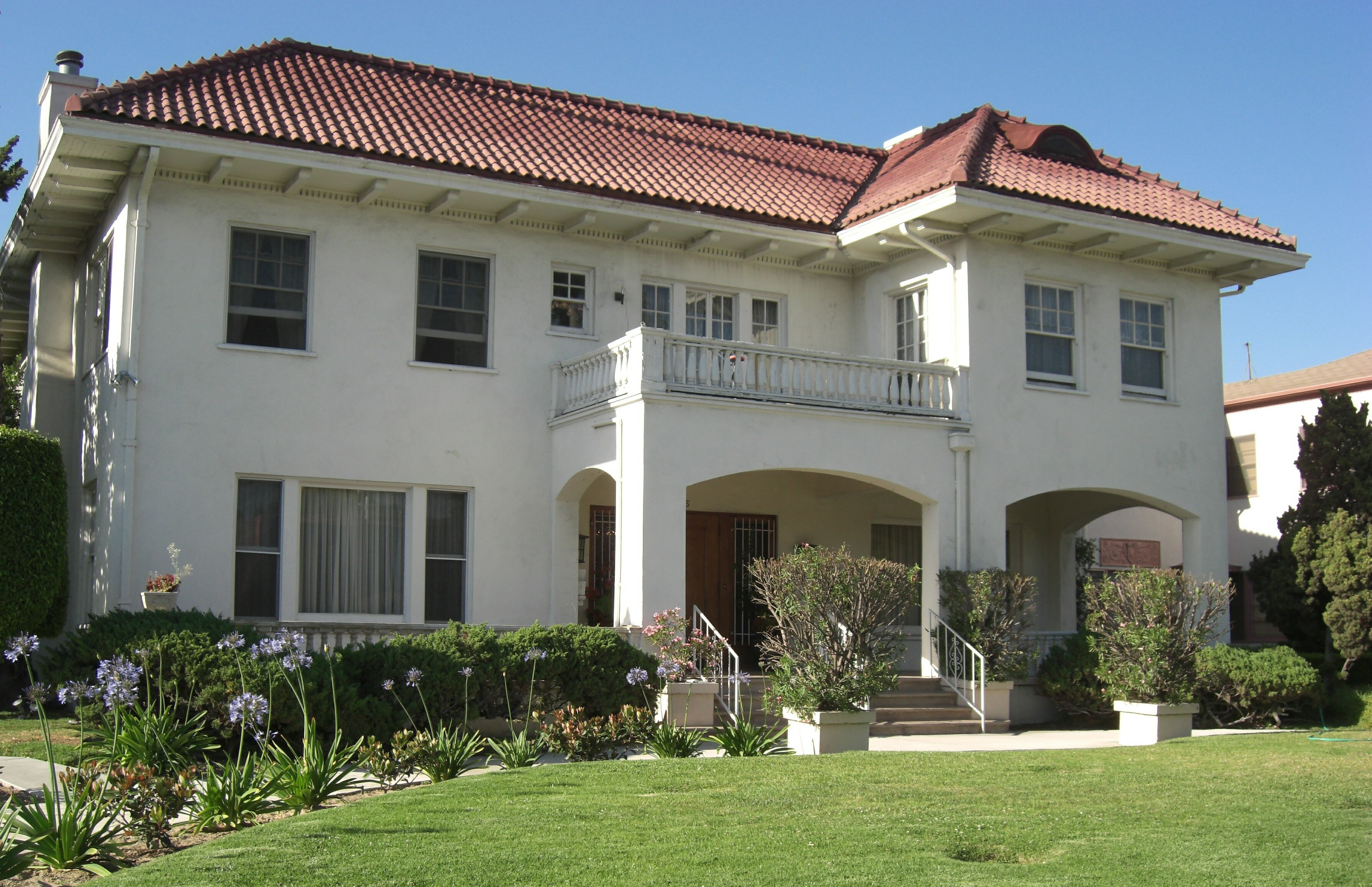
- Wilfandel Club House; 3425 West Adams Boulevard
- Formation: November 21, 1945
- Founder: Della Mae Williams, Fannie Williams
- Founded at: West Adams District, Los Angeles, CA 90018
- Type: Woman's club
- Website: http://Wilfandelclub.com

The Wilfandel Club is the oldest African-American women's club in Los Angeles. The group was founded in 1945 with the goal of promoting civic betterment, philanthropic endeavors, and general culture. They maintain a clubhouse, sponsor a scholarship, and hold monthly meetings, which feature guest speakers.

== History ==
The club was established in 1945 by black women active in the community.

The name Wilfandel is a combination of the names of founding members Fannie Williams and Della Mae Givens Williams (no relation).

Once the Wilfandel Club members purchased the building, the Wilfandel Club house became a popular venue for holding farewell parties for young African-American men who went off to fight America’s wars, or for young people leaving to attend college. The Wilfandel Club house was one of the few integrated public meeting places in Los Angeles during the 1950s.

The club house is still used today by the members of the Wilfandel Club for meetings, weddings and other functions. It is equipped with a full kitchen.

In 2019, the National Trust for Historic Preservation awarded the Winfandel club a $75,000 grant through its African American Cultural Heritage Action Fund (AACHAF). The purpose of the grant was to assist the organization with essential infrastructure upkeep of the clubhouse.

On February 26, 2026, CBS News aired a segment about the Wilfandel Club titled "A look at a Los Angeles Black women’s club and its historic home ".

== Location ==
The Wilfandel House is located at 3425 West Adams Boulevard in the West Adams District of Los Angeles.

== Membership ==
Della Mae Givens Williams, wife of architect Paul Williams, helped establish the club.

Club member Bessie Bruington Burke received her teaching credentials in 1911 and soon became the first Black teacher in the Los Angeles City School District.

== Philanthropy ==
Wilfandel members also have raised thousands of dollars to support the American Cancer Society, the Exceptional Children’s Foundation, the Foundation for the Junior Blind, as well as the National Association for the Advancement of Colored People. For its contributions to the community, the club is the recipient of the Community Service Award, presented by the California State Attorney General. Today, Wilfandel Club members total more than 60 African-American women.
