= Herbert M. Baruch Corporation =

The Herbert M. Baruch Corporation (commonly the Baruch Corporation) was one of the largest general contractors in Southern California during the early to mid-20th century. During its existence from 1920 to 1955 the company constructed over 500 buildings including Hollywood Bowl, Beverly Hills City Hall, and other major civic and commercial buildings, many of which are now historic buildings.

== History ==
The company was founded by Los Angeles native Herbert M. Baruch (1894–1955) upon his return from military service in World War I. His family was a prominent pioneer family in Southern California in the early 20th century that originated from Bavaria, and his father Jacob, with his brother Herman, was a principal in the prominent wholesale grocer Haas, Baruch and Company (one of the other partners was Abraham Haas, father of Walter A. Haas, and this company eventually became Smart & Final).

In 1932 the Baruch Corporation was sued by actress Ann Christy for $100,730 in damages when she was involved in a collision with a ditching machine owned by the company.

Baruch married twice: his first marriage was to Dorothy née Walter (1899–1962), an author and educator. He later married his second wife Rosemary née Bloom (1906–1972), a local socialite. The first union had two children, Herbert M. Baruch Jr. and Nancy Baruch Smith. Baruch was active on several boards including the local Red Cross and Community Chest, a forerunner to the United Way. He was a founding member of the Beach Club, a private social club in Santa Monica.

Despondent over business difficulties and ill health, Herbert Baruch shot himself in his Hollywood Hills home in 1955. The business ceased operations the same year.

== Selected works ==
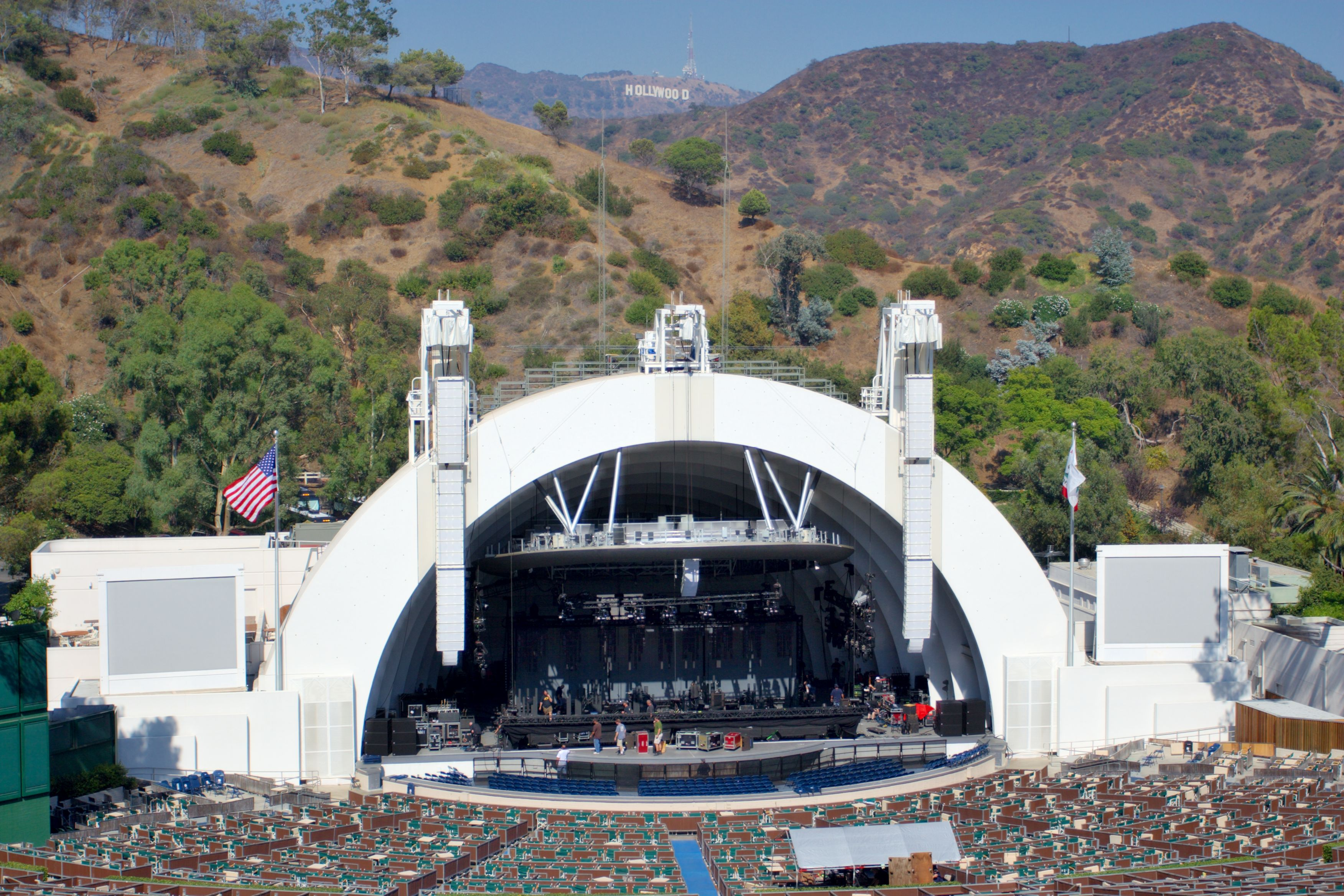
Hollywood Bowl – the Baruch Corporation built the first generation shell and seating.

This is a partial listing of the company's projects:

- Huntington Park Post Office (1925)
- Beverly Hills City Hall (1932)
- The Brentwood Country Mart 1920s
- Cedars of Lebanon Hospital (1930), now part of the Los Angeles Scientology Campus
- Golden State Mutual Life Insurance Building (1949)
- Harris Newmark Building (1926), now the New Mart Building
- Hollywood Bowl Permanent Seating (1926)
- Los Angeles Philharmonic Auditorium Modernization (1920s)
- Los Angeles Harbor Junior College, now Los Angeles Harbor College
- Mayfair Hotel, Los Angeles (1926)
- Mira Hershey Hall, University of California, Los Angeles (1930s)
- Paramount Studios, Administrative Offices
- Ramona Gardens (1939)
- Valley Municipal Building, informally "Van Nuys City Hall" (1932)
- William Mead Homes (1942)
- Wilshire Boulevard Temple 1929

== Notes ==
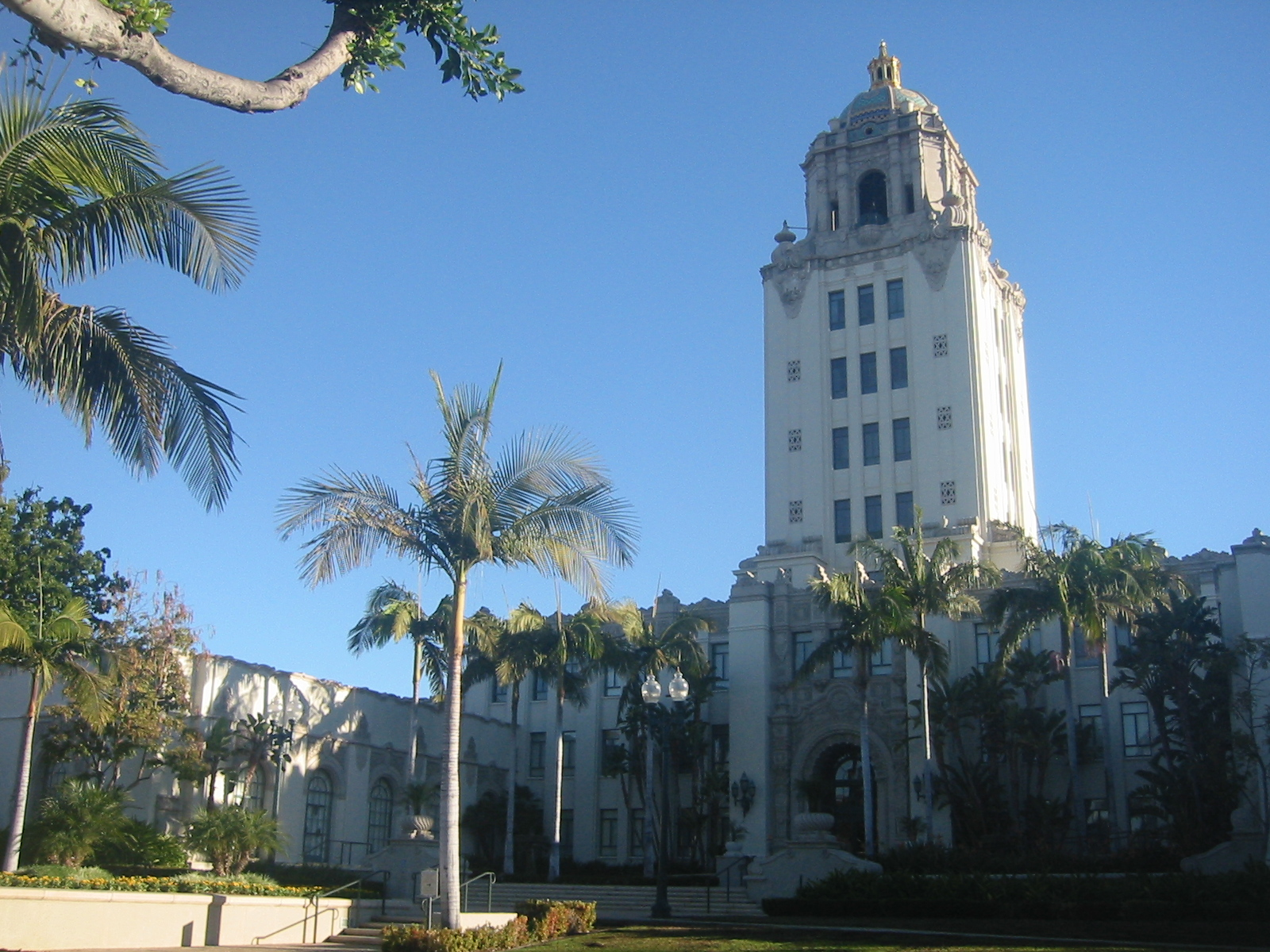
Beverly Hills City Hall
