= Golden State Mutual Life Insurance Company =

Life insurance company

Golden State Mutual Life
- Type: Mutual insurance company
- Industry: Insurance
- Founded: Los Angeles, California on July 23, 1925
- Founder: William Nickerson Jr.
- Defunct: 2009
- Successor: IA American Life
- Headquarters: 1999 West Adams Boulevard, Los Angeles California, United States, 90018
- Area served: Western United States
- Website: www.gsmlife.com

Golden State Mutual Life Insurance Company was once the largest black-owned insurance company in the western United States, founded by William Nickerson Jr. with the assistance of Norman Oliver Houston and George Allen Beavers Jr.

== Founding ==
In the mid-1920s, when William Nickerson Jr., an insurance salesman and publisher from Texas, arrived in Los Angeles, he was alarmed to discover that most of the 16,000 blacks living in the city were unable to obtain life insurance. Unable to afford an attorney, Nickerson studied law to determine the state's requirements to form a corporation to accommodate this need. He partnered with fellow insurance salesman Norman O. Houston and businessman George A. Beavers Jr. to secure 500 pre-paid life insurance applications as well as the $15,000 deposit required by California. Houston raised the $15,000 and Beavers found 500 blacks that would pay premiums for a company that was yet to be established.

On July 23, 1925, they opened as the Golden State Guarantee Fund Insurance Company in a one-room office at 1435 Central Avenue, Los Angeles, with few amenities and $17,800 in capital. Within three months the company had outgrown its office and moved to a storeroom at 3512 Central Avenue. By the end of its first year the company had established an office in Oakland, California, which sold more than $260,000 in policies, and had $6,000 in reserves and a surplus of over $16,000. Within three years, Golden State Insurance had over 100 employees including sixty agents as well as branches in Pasadena, Bakersfield, San Diego and Fresno.

== Early years ==
In 1928, using all African American design and labor, they built the two-story Golden State Mutual Life Insurance Building at 4261 Central Avenue where the firm occupied the top floor while the main floor was rented to merchants. The company remained profitable throughout the Great Depression in the 1930s. The company began paying out dividends beginning in 1930 and continued to do until it entered into its terminal decline. The name was changed to Golden State Mutual Life Insurance Company in 1931, and by the end of the 1930s, assets had grown up to $437,000 with $6 million in policies. In 1938 they set up operations in Illinois and in 1944 they opened a branch in Texas. By the end of World War II assets stood at $2 million, surplus funds at $750,000, and they had nearly $24 million in policies.

== Continued growth and expansion ==
When the company's founder William Nickerson Jr. died in 1945, Houston became president and Beavers was elevated to board chairman. Under the new leadership, the company continued its expansion. Eventually Golden State Mutual had offices in 14 states with over $4 billion in policies.

In 1949, Golden State Mutual opened its new headquarters at 1999 West Adams Boulevard in Los Angeles, which was designed by Paul Williams.

As a major institution within the black community, representatives of Golden State Mutual were active in the civil rights movement.

However, in the wake of integration, Golden State Mutual as well as other black-owned businesses began to lose market share and influence. In 1962, when Beavers took on the added role as president of the National Insurance Association, it was apparent that something needed to be done to ensure the continued viability of black-owned businesses.

In 1970, Houston's sons, Norman B. Houston and Ivan J. Houston, took over active management of Golden State Mutual. While the company continued to succeed, rough financial waters lay ahead.

== Economic decline ==
By the 1980s, Golden State Mutual was struggling to maintain profitability.

The Golden State Mutual African American Art Collection was sold at auction on 4 October 2007 and dispersed.

On September 20, 2009, California Insurance Commissioner Steve Poizner placed Golden State Mutual into conservation after its surplus funds dropped below required minimum levels. This occurred after six consecutive years of net operating losses. As the result, the state ordered that Golden State Mutual's policies be taken over by IA American Life Insurance Company.

The selection of IA American Life came as a result of a national bidding process involving more than 40 active life insurers. IA American Life Insurance Company, rated A− (Excellent) by noted insurance rating firm A. M. Best, was the only bidder that satisfied all key components of the selection criteria. This included the ability to assume 100% of the Golden State Mutual policies, so that policyholders would be fully protected under the transaction while the remaining creditors and investors would have a much greater potential to be repaid.

== Art collection ==
The Golden State Mutual Life Insurance Company owned a significant collection of artwork by African American artists, acquired and curated by one of their employees, artist William Pajaud. As art historian Kellie Jones states, the company had 'committed itself to supporting black creativity' since its founding but Pajaud 'moved Golden State to a new level of support for artists'. Employed in 1957, Pajaud worked initially as art director in design for the company, and then ran the public relations department, but as a trained artist had a knowledge of art and connections with many fellow artists. He proposed starting a company collection in 1965 to celebrate the company's fortieth birthday, and with a small budget acquired over 200 works of art over the next twenty or so years, including works by Jacob Lawrence, Charles White, Betye Saar, Elizabeth Catlett, Richmond Barthé, Hale Woodruff, Charles Alston, Varnette P. Honeywood, David Hammons, Romare Bearden, John Biggers, Samella Lewis, Henry Ossawa Tanner and Willie Middlebrook. The collection also included African art such as masks and sculpture from the Ivory Coast and Gabon. Works were displayed in the corridors and offices of the company's building on Adams Boulevard, Los Angeles.

The collection was auctioned in 2007 when the company went out of business. 124 works were acquired by Los Angeles County.
