= Golden State Mutual Life Insurance Building (1928) =

- U.S. National Register of Historic Places
- Los Angeles Historic-Cultural Monument
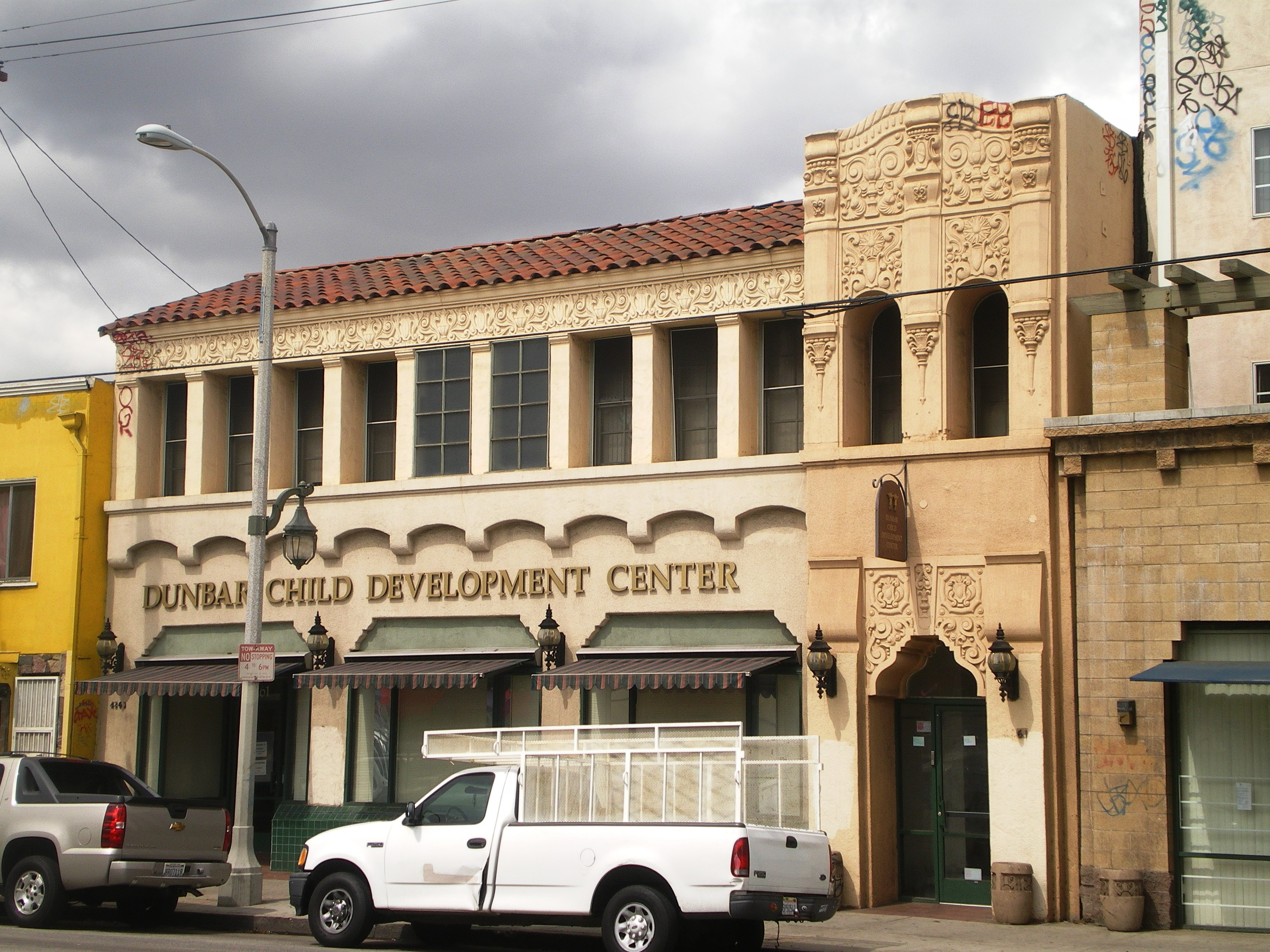
- Golden State Mutual Life Insurance Building, 2008

- Location within the Los Angeles metropolitan area Location within California Location within the United States
- Location: 4261 S. Central Ave., South Los Angeles, Los Angeles, California
- Coordinates: 34°0′23″N 118°15′21″W
- Built: 1928
- Architect: Garrott, James H.; Blodgett, Louis
- Architectural style: Mission/Spanish Revival
- NRHP reference No.: 98000712
- LAHCM No.: 580

Significant dates
- Added to NRHP: June 26, 1998
- Designated LAHCM: June 29, 1993

The Golden State Mutual Life Insurance Building was built in 1928 and for many years housed one of Los Angeles's most successful African American-owned businesses, the Golden State Mutual Life Insurance Company. The building is located in the heart of the city's Central Avenue commercial district that was a center of the jazz world in the 1930s and 1940s. The two-story building was designed by architect James H. Garrott and constructed by Louis Blodgett (both African Americans) in the Mission Revival style. The company occupied the second floor, while the first floor was rented out to local merchants. The noted Dunbar Hotel is located on the next block to the north.

In 1949, the Golden State Mutual Life Insurance Company moved to its new headquarters at 1999 West Adams, now also an historic building. The structure was later converted into a child development center known as the Dunbar Child Development Center. In 1998, the building was listed on the National Register of Historic Places.

== See also ==
- List of Registered Historic Places in Los Angeles
- List of Los Angeles Historic-Cultural Monuments in South Los Angeles
- Central Avenue
