= 117th Ohio Infantry Regiment =

- Active: September 15, 1862, to May 2, 1863
- Country: United States
- Allegiance: Union
- Branch: Infantry

The 117th Ohio Infantry Regiment, sometimes 117th Ohio Volunteer Infantry (or 117th OVI) was an infantry regiment in the Union Army during the American Civil War.

== Service ==
The 117th Ohio Infantry was organized at Portsmouth, Ohio, and eight companies mustered in on September 15, 1862, for three years service under the command of Lieutenant Colonel Chauncey G. Hawley.

The regiment was attached to District of Eastern Kentucky, Department of the Ohio.

The 117th Ohio Infantry ceased to exist when it was changed to 1st Ohio Heavy Artillery on May 2, 1863.

== Detailed service ==
Ordered to Kentucky October 2. Camp at Ashland, Kentucky, until January 1863. Moved to Paintsville, Kentucky, January 1863; then to Covington, Kentucky, via Peach Orchard, Louisa, and Catlettsburg, February 1863. Duty at Covington until May.

== Commanders ==
- Lieutenant Colonel Chauncey G. Hawley

== See also ==
- List of Ohio Civil War units
- Ohio in the Civil War
