= Golden State Mutual Life Insurance Building (1949) =

- Interactive map of the Golden State Mutual Life Insurance Building area

General information
- Status: Completed
- Type: Commercial Offices / Non-Profit
- Location: 1999 West Adams Boulevard; Los Angeles, California 90018
- Coordinates: 34.032989°N 118.308798°W
- Construction started: 1948
- Completed: 1949
- Cost: $956,000 (1949)
- Owner: South Central Los Angeles Regional Center (SCLARC)
- Operator: South Central Los Angeles Regional Center (SCLARC)

Height
- Roof: 25.6 m (84 ft)

Technical details
- Floor count: 5 Plus Mezzanine and Basement
- Floor area: 5,017 m^{2} (54,000 sq ft)

Design and construction
- Architect: Paul Revere Williams
- Developer: Golden State Mutual Life Insurance Company
- Structural engineer: Morris K. Goldsmith
- Main contractor: Herbert M. Baruch Corporation

Los Angeles Historic-Cultural Monument
- Designated: April 7, 2011
- Reference no.: 1000

The Golden State Mutual Life Insurance Building is a landmark 5-story, 84 ft (26 m) office building in the Late Modern style built in 1949 as the headquarters for its namesake company. The building was designed by Paul Revere Williams, the noted African-American Architect. The building is located in West Adams in South Los Angeles about 3.5 miles southwest of Downtown Los Angeles and 2 miles northwest of Exposition Park and USC at the intersection of Adams Blvd and Western Avenue. This was the company's second building to bear this name, the first having been built in 1928.

== Design and construction ==
Founded in 1925 Golden State Mutual Life Insurance Company (GSM) was the largest African American owned insurance company in the Western United States and was the first to offer all persons life insurance regardless of race. The company grew extensively during the 1920s and 1930s serving this previously unserved market.

In 1946 the board of the Golden State Mutual Company decided it had outgrown its second 1928 building on Central Ave (also an historic building) and to relocate to a new site at the corner of West Adams Boulevard and South Western Ave (1999 West Adams) in the West Adams District. At that time this location was described as "most attractive business corners outside of downtown Los Angeles" due to its convenient location on major bus lines. The company's decision to locate here, in part, signaled the decline of the Central Avenue District for the city's African American Population.

The company commissioned Paul Williams as the architect for the new building. He designed the five-story steel and concrete structure (with mezzanine and basement levels) to accommodate over 300 employees and planned its interior "around the way the company operates" with a 400-seat auditorium with state of the art audiovisual equipment, a 150-person cafeteria, and employee lounge and medical department. The generous two story main lobby was flanked by two murals by Charles H. Alston and Hale A. Woodruff that represented the history of African American in California from the state's founding to the then present day.

Construction was completed by the Herbert M. Baruch Corporation with a final cost of $956,000 with an additional $107,000 in furniture. The building opened in August 1949 in a week-long celebration attended by California Lieutenant Governor Goodwin Knight and other dignitaries and cemented the company's place in the community. It was described in one contemporary source "…as the finest building to be erected and owned by Negroes in the nation"

== Building History ==
In the mid-1950s vertical sun shades were added to the three prominent vertical window bands facing the intersection possibly due to heat gain on the then un-air conditioned building. These were removed in recent renovations.

The Golden State Mutual Life Insurance company occupied the building until 2009 when the company became insolvent. The California Department of Insurance forced the liquidation of the company and its assets, including its building and its art collection. In 2011 this commission also attempted to separately sell off the famous lobby murals to the Smithsonian Institution. In response, the owners and local preservationists petitioned the City of Los Angeles to add the building as Los Angeles Historic-Cultural Monument #1000 and ultimately prevailed in their efforts to retain the murals as part of the building's original fabric.

== Recent Renovation ==
Between 2014 – 2015 the building was completely renovated, its building systems replaced and its original 1949 appearance restored at the exterior and within key interior spaces. A new six-level building constructed on the original building's parking lot was added and together both buildings serve as the main "Legacy Plaza" campus for the South Central Los Angeles Regional Center (SCLARC), a non-profit dedicated to serving the developmentally disabled. The work was designed by a team led by AE3 Partners in association with Steinberg Hart and was constructed by a joint venture of KSJ Construction and VCC Builders.

As part of this renovation, on October 29, 2015, a monument and memorial plaza to Paul Williams was dedicated just to the north of this building. The monument features a 9 foot tall bas relief of Paul Williams with many of his significant works in the background completed by local artist Georgia Tolivier (Tolanna). The bas relief is flanked with interpretive panels with a biography of Mr. Williams as well as a history of the Golden State Mutual Life Insurance Company.

== Photos ==
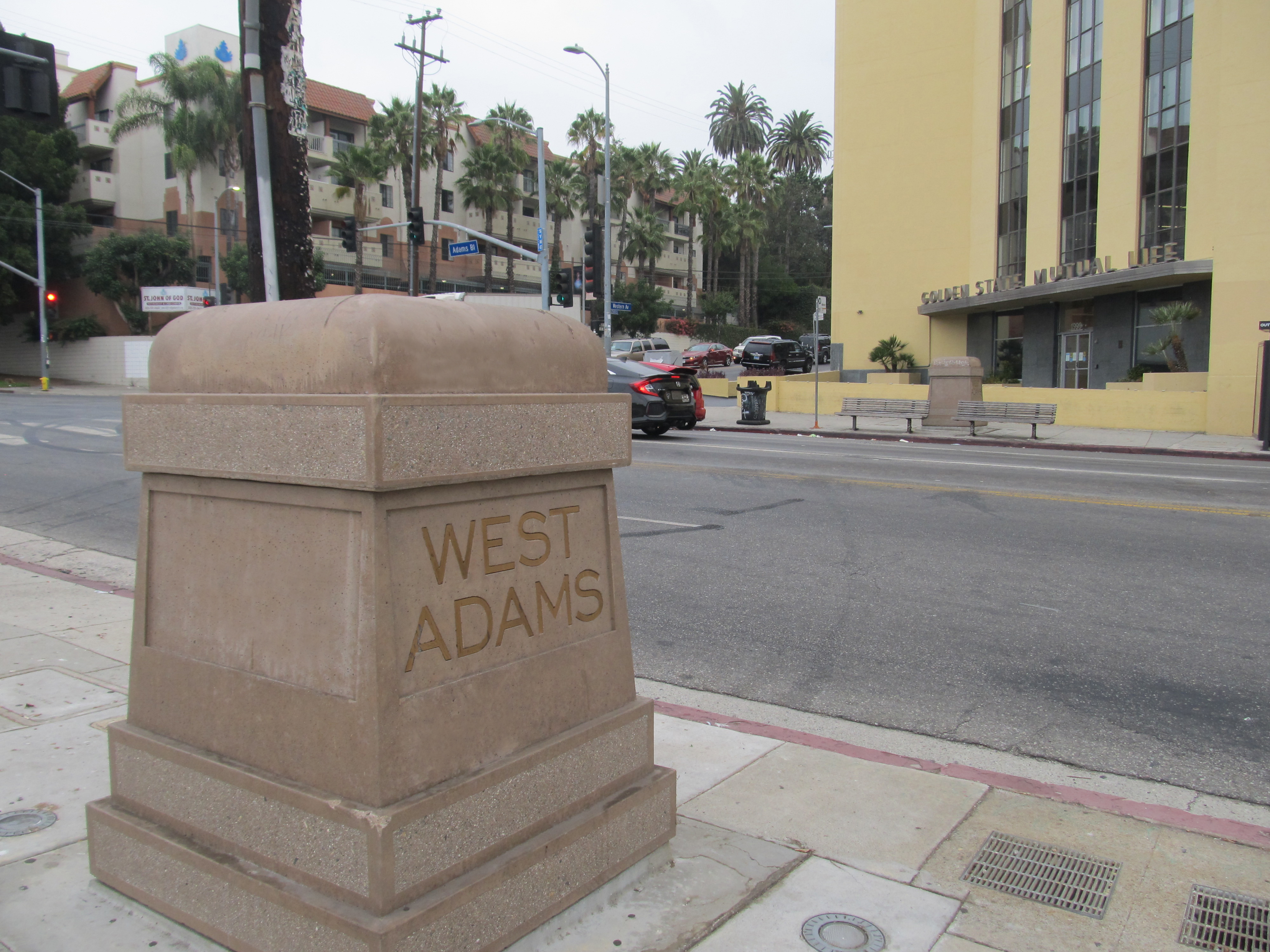
West Adams concrete marker in front of the Golden State Mutual Life Insurance Building, 2021.

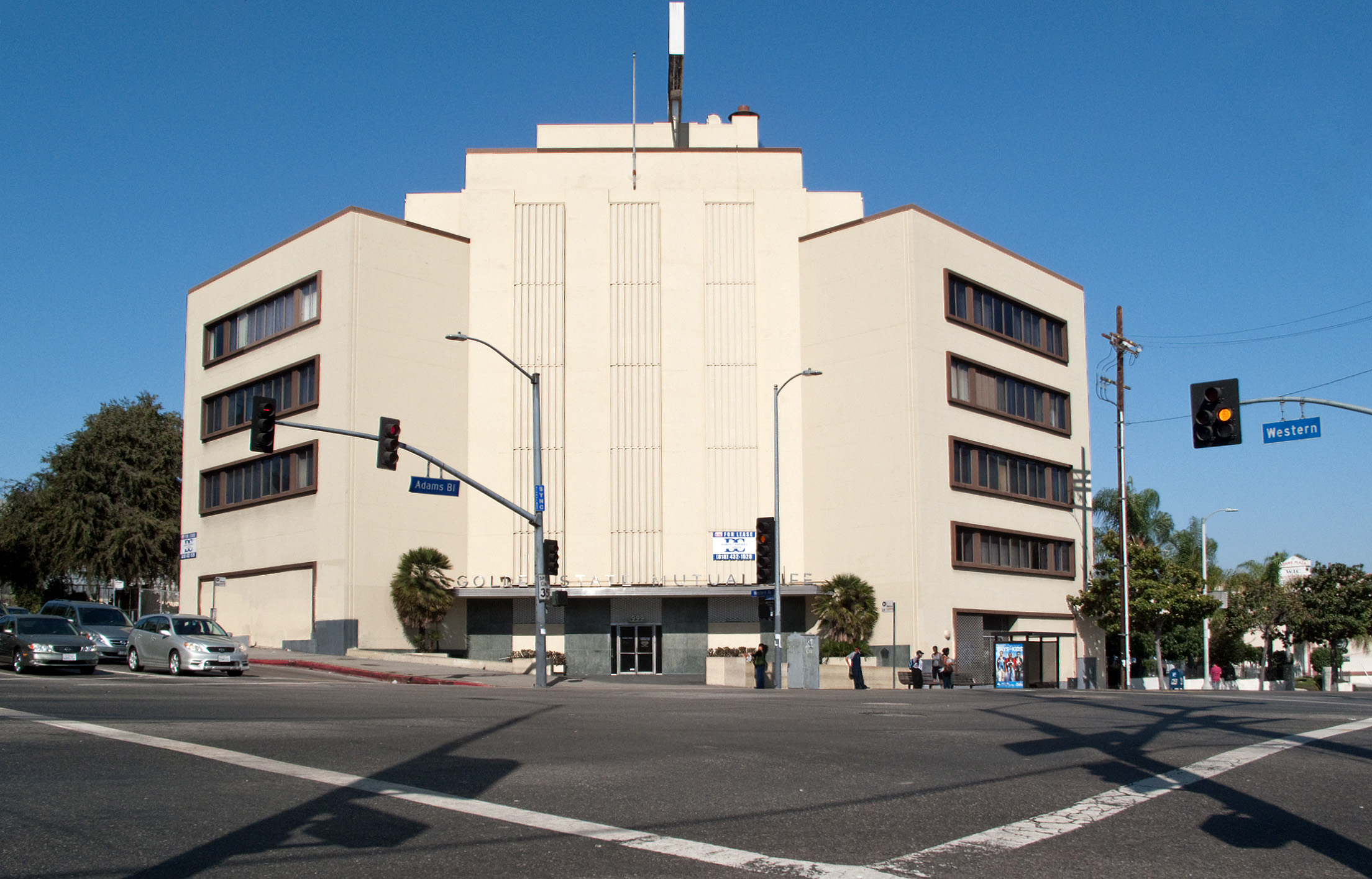
View of the Golden State Building prior to its 2014/2015 renovation. Note the sunshades added in the 1950s that were later removed.

View of the main lobby showing one of the historic murals above

View of the building from the corner of Adams and Western in 2015 after its recent renovation.

View of the main auditorium from the mezzanine level

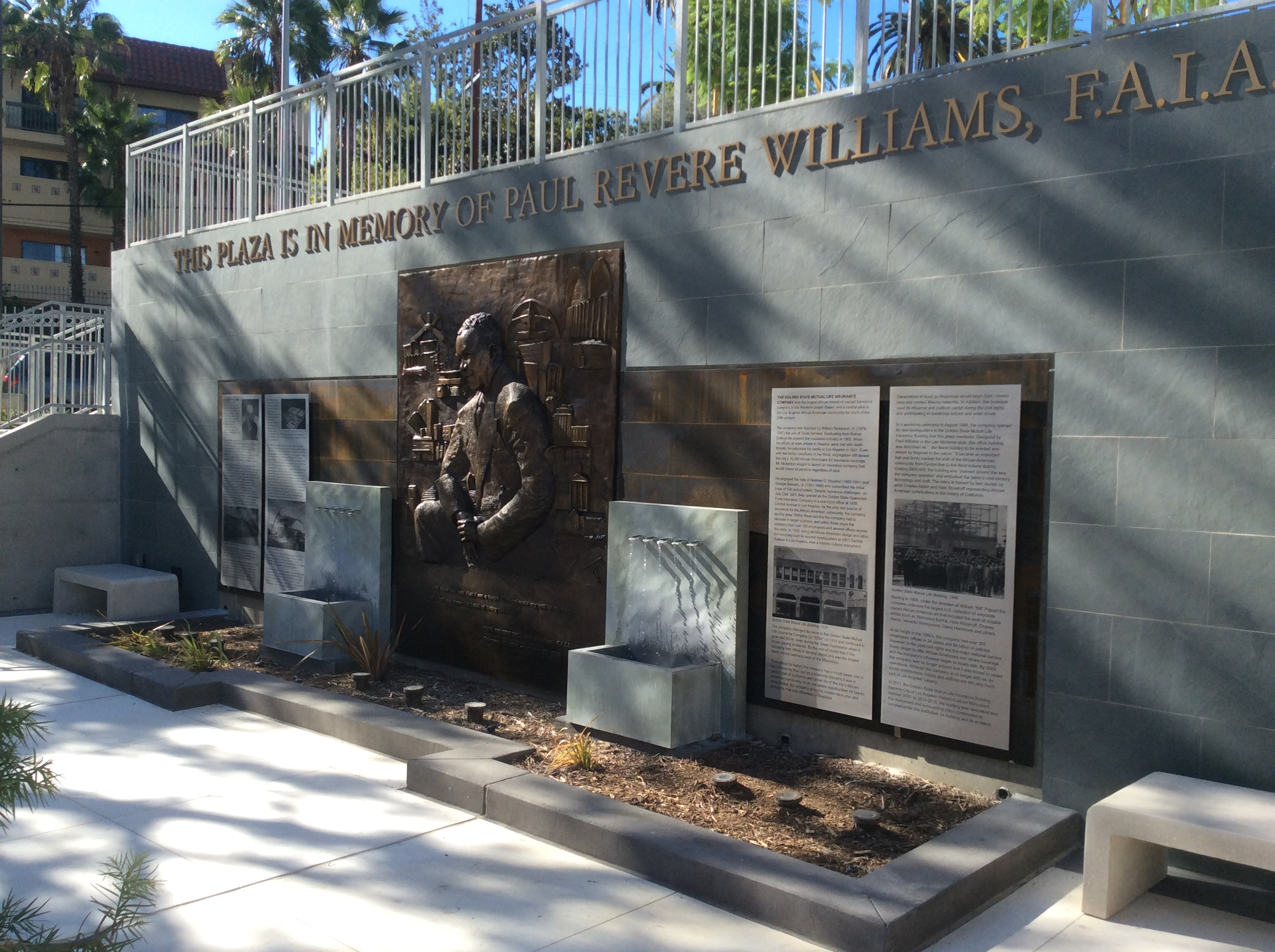
Monument to Paul Revere Williams dedicated October 2015 north of the building.
