= 1st Ohio Heavy Artillery Regiment =

- Active: 2 May 1863 to 25 July 1865
- Country: United States
- Allegiance: Union
- Branch: Heavy artillery

1st Ohio Heavy Artillery Regiment was an artillery regiment that served in the Union Army during the American Civil War.

== Service ==
The 1st Ohio Heavy Artillery Regiment was originally organized at Portsmouth, Ohio on 15 September 1862 as the 117th Ohio Infantry. The regiment was changed to heavy artillery on 2 May 1863.

The regiment was attached to 2nd Brigade, 4th Division, XXIII Corps, Department of the Ohio, to February 1865. 1st Brigade, 4th Division, District of East Tennessee, Department of the Cumberland, to July 1865.

The 1st Ohio Heavy Artillery mustered out of service on 25 July 1865 at Knoxville, Tennessee.

== Detailed service ==
Constructed fortifications around Covington and Newport, Ky., until August 1863. Guard duty in Kentucky by detachments: Company D at Paris, Companies F and I at Lexington, Companies H, K, L, and M at Camp Nelson, until January 1864. At Camp Burnside 14 January to 19 February. March over mountains to Knoxville, Tenn., 19 February – 9 March and duty there until June. On railroad guard duty in Tennessee until September. Murphy, N.C., 28 June (Companies C, H, L, and M). Repulse of Wheeler's attacks on the Chattanooga, Knoxville & Virginia Railroad, August. Athens 1 August (detachment). Pursuit of Confederates from Athens into North Carolina 1–3 August. Murphy, N.C., 2 August (Companies C, H, L, and M). Sweetwater and Philadelphia 20 August (detachments). Strawberry Plains, 24 August. Gillem's Expedition from eastern Tennessee toward southwestern Virginia 20 September – 17 October (Companies B, F, G, I, and K). Moved to Cleveland, Tenn., 7 October, then to Chattanooga 11 October and return to Cleveland 19 October. Duty at Cleveland and Charleston until December. Foraging Expeditions on the French Broad and Chucky River in eastern Tennessee and North Carolina December 1864 to January 1865. Stoneman's Campaign in southwest Virginia and western North Carolina February to April 1865. Duty in District of East Tennessee, Department of the Cumberland, to July 1865.

== Casualties ==
The regiment lost a total of 171 men during service; 6 enlisted men killed or mortally wounded and 1 officer and 164 enlisted men died of disease.

== Commanders ==
- Lieutenant Colonel Fordyce M. Keith

== See also ==
- List of Ohio Civil War units
- Ohio in the Civil War
