= Malka Rappaport Hovav =

American linguist

- מלכה רפופורט חובב

Academic background
- Education: Massachusetts Institute of Technology (PhD)
- Doctoral advisor: Morris Halle

Academic work
- Discipline: Linguistics
- Sub-discipline: Lexical Semantics, Morphosyntax
- Website: HUJI faculty page

Malka Rappaport Hovav (Hebrew: מלכה רפופורט חובב) is a linguist and professor in the Department of Linguistics at the Hebrew University of Jerusalem (HUJI). Her research focuses on lexical semantics and morphosyntax, and she has published on topics like nominalizations, adjectival passives, and lexical aspect, among others.

== Biography ==
After earning a BA from Brooklyn College in 1979, Rappaport Hovav earned her PhD from Massachusetts Institute of Technology in 1984 with a dissertation entitled, "Issues in the Phonology of Tiberian Hebrew" under the supervision of Morris Halle.

Rappaport Hovav taught at Bar Ilan University from 1984 until 1999, excepting one year as a visiting professor at Rutgers University from 1993/1994, and in 1999 she began working at the Hebrew University of Jerusalem.

She was a founding member, and later director, of HUJI's Language, Logic and Cognition Center, and since 2012 has held the Henya Sharef Chair in Humanities.

== Awards and honors ==
In 2016, Rappaport Hovav served as chair of the selection committee for the Israel Prize in Linguistics.

In 2022, Rappaport Hovav received the Humboldt Research Award

In 2024, Rappaport Hovav was elected to the Academia Europaea.

== Selected publications ==
- Levin, Beth; Rappaport Hovav, Malka (1995). Unaccusativity: At the Syntax-Lexical Semantics Interface. Cambridge, Mass.: MIT Press. ISBN 0-262-62094-4.
- Levin, Beth; Rappaport Hovav, Malka (2005). Argument Realization. Cambridge: Cambridge University Press. ISBN 0-521-66331-8.
- Rappaport Hovav, Malka; Levin, Beth (March 2008). "The English dative alternation: The case for verb sensitivity". Journal of Linguistics. 44 (1): 129–167. doi:10.1017/S0022226707004975. ISSN 1469-7742.
- Rappaport Hovav, Malka (2008). "Lexicalized meaning and the internal temporal structure of events" (PDF). Theoretical and Crosslinguistic Approaches to the Semantics of Aspect (13).
