= Sixth Church of Christ, Scientist (Milwaukee) =

Historic church in Wisconsin, United States

- U.S. National Register of Historic Places
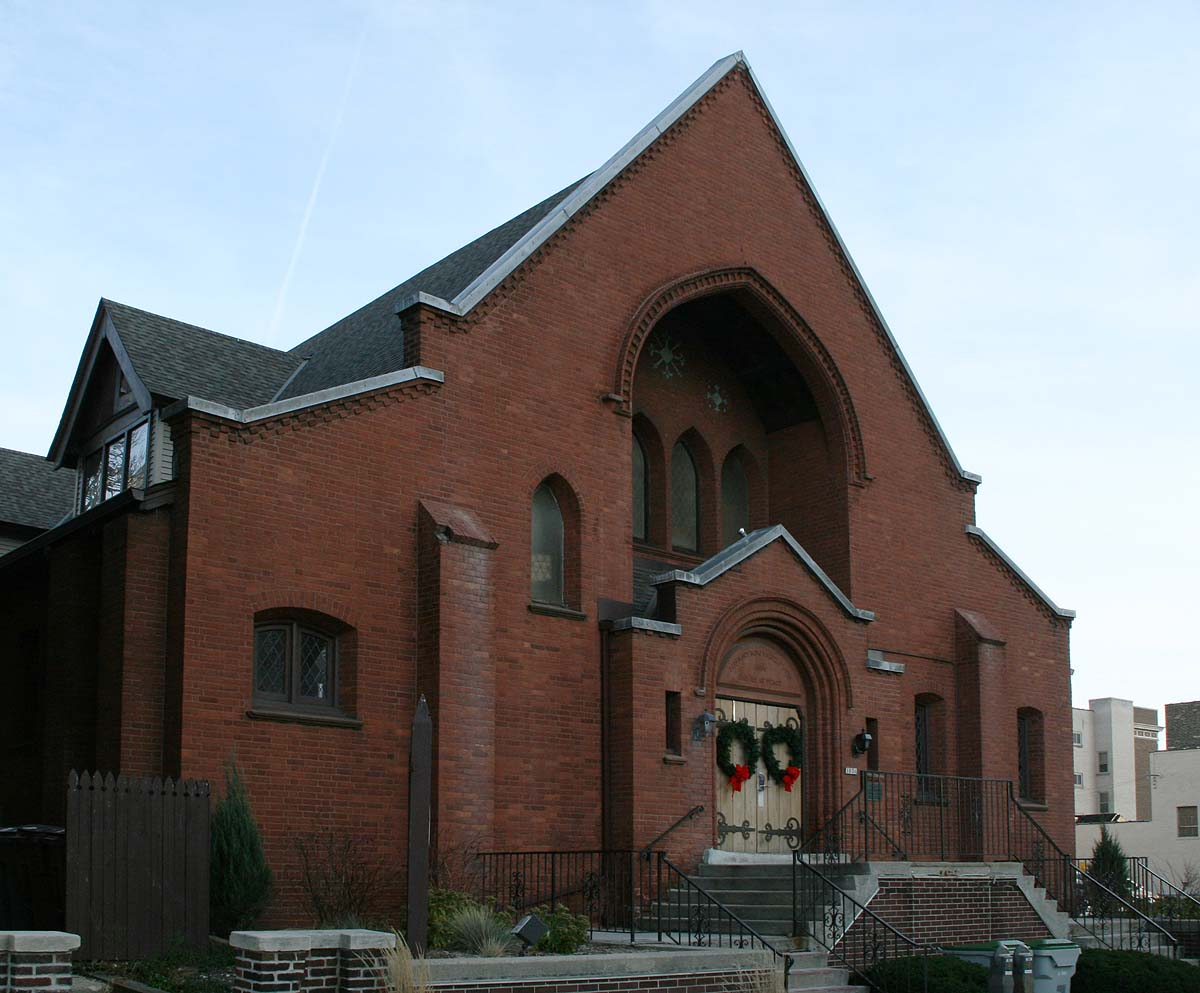
- November 2010

- Location within Wisconsin Location within the United States
- Location: 1036 N. Van Buren St., Milwaukee, Wisconsin
- Coordinates: 43°2′42″N 87°54′17″W
- Area: 0.4 acres (0.16 ha)
- Built: 1902
- Architect: Elmer Grey; Ellis & Coogan
- Architectural style: Gothic, Romanesque
- NRHP reference No.: 80000168
- Added to NRHP: March 27, 1980

The former Sixth Church of Christ, Scientist, built in 1902, is an historic Christian Science church edifice located at 1036 North Van Buren Street in Milwaukee, Wisconsin. In 1980 the building was added to the National Register of Historic Places. On May 17, 1983, Sixth Church was made a locally designated historic site by the city of Milwaukee.

Mary Baker Eddy discovered Christian Science in Massachusetts in 1866 and founded the first church in 1879 in Boston. In 1883 the dentist Dr. Silas Sawyer and his wife Jenny of Milwaukee traveled to Boston to study Eddy's ideas on healing. They began to perform healings back in Milwaukee in January 1884 and began to hold meetings in Sawyer's dental parlor. In October 1884 they organized the Christian Scientists Association of Wisconsin - the second official C.S. association in the world. In 1889 the church in Milwaukee was organized.

In 1902 the association was ready for a new building. They hired architect Elmer Grey, who was then based in Milwaukee, but later moved to California where he designed Christian Science churches in Los Angeles and Long Beach. Grey designed the red brick building trimmed with red sandstone, with a rectangular footprint and a gable roof. Most Christian Science churches at this time were styled Neoclassical, but Grey gave this building some Gothic Revival features (the faint lancet in some arches, the buttresses on the front wall, and the tall chimney) and some Romanesque Revival features (the round arch above the door, the large arch above that, and the asymmetric placement of the chimney). Inside is a nave with side aisles, lit by amber windows in the dormers above. On one side is a reading room with a green-tiled fireplace.

Today the building is occupied by Brew City Church.

== See also ==
- Sixth Church of Christ, Scientist (disambiguation)
- List of former Christian Science churches, societies and buildings
