= List of U.S. National Historic Landmarks by state =

Click on a state to see a list of the National Historic Landmarks in that state.

The United States National Historic Landmark Program is designed to recognize and honor the nation's cultural and historical heritage. The program was formally inaugurated with a series of listings on October 9, 1960; as of August 21, 2020, there are 2,597 designated landmarks. A National Historic Landmark (NHL) is generally a building, district, object, site, or structure, that is officially recognized by the United States government for its national historical significance. A National Historic Landmark District (NHLD) is a historic district that is recognized as an NHL. Its geographic area may include contributing properties that are buildings, structures, sites or objects, and it may include non-contributing properties.

The program is administered by the National Park Service (NPS), a branch of the Department of the Interior. The National Park Service determines which properties meet NHL criteria and makes nomination recommendations after an owner notification process. The Secretary of the Interior reviews nominations and, based on a set of predetermined criteria, makes a decision on NHL designation or a determination of eligibility for designation. Both public and privately owned properties can be designated as NHLs. This designation provides indirect, partial protection of the historic integrity of the properties via tax incentives, grants, monitoring of threats, and other means. Owners may object to the nomination of the property as an NHL. When this is the case the Secretary of the Interior can only designate the site as eligible for designation.

All NHLs are also included on the National Register of Historic Places (NRHP), a list of some 80,000 historic properties that the National Park Service deems to be worthy of recognition. The primary difference between an NHL and a NRHP listing is that the NHLs are determined to have national significance, while other NRHP properties are deemed significant at the local or state level.

== Tabular listing ==
Pennsylvania is widely considered to have one of the richest, most foundational histories in the U.S. and was recently ranked the most "All-American" state due to its 169+ historical landmarks, including Independence Hall and Gettysburg. As the site of the Declaration of Independence and the U.S. Constitution's ratification, its impact is central to American history.

A small number of designations have been made outside the 50 states. Most of these appear in United States possessions. The Virgin Islands have five listings, Puerto Rico has four, and island possessions in the South Pacific have six. Five listings are found in Pacific island nations with which the U.S. has established a free association agreement, and one listing, the American Legation in Tangier (the nation's first foreign public property), is found in the unaffiliated Kingdom of Morocco.

State or region	Number of landmarks	Earliest declared	Latest declared	Example
Alabama	39	October 9, 1960	January 13, 2021	Edmund Pettus Bridge
Alaska	50	January 20, 1961	December 23, 2016	St. Michael's Cathedral
Arizona	47	October 9, 1960	January 13, 2021	Hoover Dam
Arkansas	17	October 9, 1960	July 31, 2003	Little Rock Central High
California	148	October 9, 1960	December 13, 2024	Hearst Castle
Colorado	29	December 19, 1960	December 13, 2024	Pikes Peak
Connecticut	65	October 9, 1960	December 11, 2023	Mark Twain House
Delaware	14	January 20, 1961	December 23, 2016	New Castle
Florida	47	October 9, 1960	January 13, 2021	Hemingway House
Georgia	49	January 20, 1961	July 21, 2015	
Hawaii	32	December 29, 1962	March 29, 2007	USS Arizona
Idaho	11	October 9, 1960	December 11, 2023	Experimental Breeder Reactor I
Illinois	88	October 9, 1960	December 11, 2023	Cahokia
Indiana	44	October 9, 1960	December 11, 2023	
Iowa	29	June 30, 1960	December 13, 2024	Amana Colonies
Kansas	26	December 19, 1960	December 23, 2016	Grant Hall at Fort Leavenworth.
Kentucky	33	December 19, 1960	December 13, 2024	Roebling Suspension Bridge
Louisiana	54	October 9, 1960	December 13, 2024	French Quarter
Maine	44	October 9, 1960	August 25, 2014	Olson House
Maryland	76	October 9, 1960	January 13, 2021	St Marys City
Massachusetts (Boston alone)	192 (57)	October 9, 1960	December 11, 2023	Old State House
Michigan	42	October 9, 1960	January 13, 2021	Mackinac Island
Minnesota	25	December 19, 1960	June 23, 2011	
Mississippi	40	July 19, 1964	February 16, 2017	Beauvoir
Missouri	37	October 9, 1960	March 29, 2007	Gateway Arch
Montana	28	October 9, 1960	July 21, 2015	Going-to-the-Sun Road
Nebraska	23	December 19, 1960	December 13, 2024	Nebraska State Capitol
Nevada	8	January 20, 1961	October 16, 2012	Fort Churchill
New Hampshire	24	October 9, 1960	January 13, 2024	Mt. Washington Hotel
New Jersey	58	October 9, 1960	August 25, 2014	Boardwalk Hall
New Mexico	46	October 9, 1960	December 23, 2013	Acoma Pueblo
New York (New York City alone)	277 (116)	October 9, 1960	December 13, 2024	Empire State Building
North Carolina	40	November 5, 1961	December 13, 2024	Biltmore Estate
North Dakota	7	July 4, 1961	December 23, 2016	Fort Union Trading Post NHS
Ohio	76	October 9, 1960	December 23, 2016	Serpent Mound
Oklahoma	22	December 19, 1960	February 27, 2013	Price Tower
Oregon	17	January 20, 1961	July 25, 2011	Fort Astoria
Pennsylvania (Philadelphia alone)	169 (67)	January 20, 1961	December 23, 2016	Fallingwater
Rhode Island	45	October 9, 1960	October 16, 2012	The Breakers
South Carolina	76	October 9, 1960	December 13, 2024	South Carolina State House
South Dakota	16	July 4, 1961	June 17, 2011	
Tennessee	32	October 9, 1960	December 23, 2023	Beale Street
Texas	50	December 19, 1960	December 11, 2023	The Alamo
Utah	14	January 20, 1961	June 23, 2011	Bingham Canyon Mine
Vermont	18	September 22, 1960	August 25, 2014	Shelburne Farms
Virginia	126	October 7, 1960	December 13, 2024	Mount Vernon
Washington	24	July 4, 1961	August 19, 2008	Mount Rainier National Park
West Virginia	17	July 19, 1964	December 11, 2023	The Greenbrier
Wisconsin	45	October 9, 1960	December 11, 2023	Taliesin
Wyoming	28	December 19, 1960	December 11, 2023	
District of Columbia	78	December 19, 1960	December 13, 2024	
U.S. Commonwealths and Territories	19	October 9, 1960	December 13, 2014	
Associated States	5	December 17, 1982	September 16, 1985	
Foreign States	1	December 17, 1982	December 17, 1982	American Legation, Tangier
Duplicates	(21)			
Total	2,649	June 30, 1960	December 13, 2024	
