= Leonard Rockshelter =

Prehistoric site in Lovelock, Nevada, US

- U.S. National Register of Historic Places
- U.S. National Historic Landmark
- Location within Nevada Location within the United States
- Nearest city: Lovelock, Nevada
- Coordinates: 39.990273°N 118.509922°W
- Area: 9.5 acres (3.8 ha)
- NRHP reference No.: 66000457

Significant dates
- Added to NRHP: October 15, 1966
- Designated NHL: January 20, 1961

Leonard Rockshelter, designated 26PE14, is a prehistoric site in the U.S. state of Nevada that was discovered in 1936. It was declared a National Historic Landmark in 1961, qualifying because its well-preserved stratigraphy revealed a long continuum of sporadic cultural occupations from 6710 BC to AD 1400. The site was named after Zenas Leonard, a member of the Bonneville-Walker expedition which passed through the Humboldt Valley in 1833. It was added to the National Register of Historic Places in 1966.

== Description ==
The Leonard Rockshelter is located on a limestone outcrop in rural Pershing County, Nevada. It is an uplifted dike, whose layers are turned sharply upward, and have since been in part covered by subsequent sedimentary deposits. The formation yields a sheltered area facing north, with scree slopes of tufa limestone eroded from the formation below it. Portions of the sheltered area have been obscured by rock falls from above, making archaeological excavation or analysis difficult.

The area first attracted archaeological attention in 1936, when guano miners recovered artifacts from the site, including shell beads, feathers, and wooden projectiles. The following year, a team from the University of California at Berkeley spent two days at the site, collecting a larger number of samples. Some of these were later radiocarbon dated to between 6710 and 5088 BCE. Further analysis has indicated that there were at least three distinct periods of occupation in prehistory, in addition to historic artifacts from the 19th century. One find dating to c. 3500 BCE was of an infant burial in a basket that had become complete carbonized over time. The oldest dated finds at the site are to c. 9249 BCE, not long after the recession of prehistoric Lake Lahontan from the region.

== See also ==
- Paleo-Indians
- List of National Historic Landmarks in Nevada
- National Register of Historic Places listings in Pershing County, Nevada
