= Berkeley Square, Los Angeles =

Demolished Historic Black Neighborhood

Berkeley Square
- Neighborhood of Los Angeles
- Location in Central Los Angeles
- Coordinates: 34°02′11″N 118°18′40″W
- Country: United States
- State: California
- County: Los Angeles
- Time zone: Pacific
- ZIP Code: 90018
- Area code: 323

Berkeley Square was a private, gated residential block in the West Adams neighborhood of Los Angeles, California. Developed in the early 20th century, the street was known for its large architect-designed homes, landscaped median, and prominent residents. Initially an exclusive white enclave, Berkeley Square became one of Los Angeles's most prestigious African American neighborhoods in the mid-20th century. The entire block was demolished in the early 1960s to make way for the Santa Monica Freeway (Interstate 10).

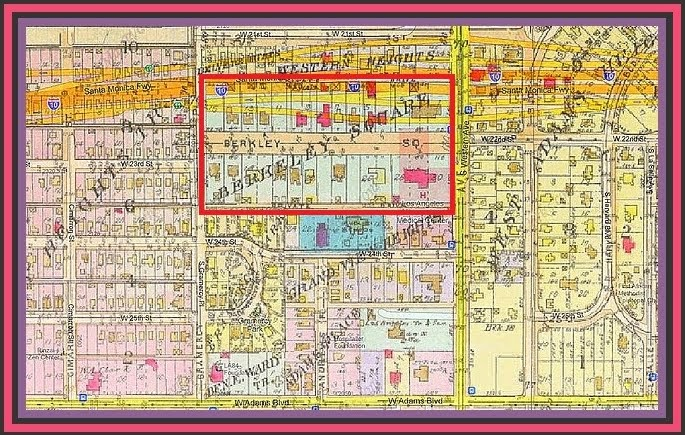
Cropped section of 1921 Baist Real Estate Atlas showing Berkeley Square, a historic gated block in Los Angeles, later demolished for the 10 Freeway.

== History and development ==
Berkeley Square was established in 1907 by real estate promoter Franklin Harper. The development, located several blocks north of West Adams Boulevard between Western and Normandie Avenues, featured 22 homes along a single gated street. Entry was controlled by stone pillars, signage, and Rosenheim-designed iron gates at Western Avenue on the east and Gramercy Place on the west.

Early residents included white professionals, businessmen and celebrities such as Edward J. Brent, William R. Burke, Walter R. Leeds and Hal Roach. Homes were restricted to white buyers through racial covenants, which remained common in Los Angeles until legal challenges in the 1940s.

Following the 1948 Shelley v. Kraemer decision, covenants became unenforceable. Many white families relocated to Hancock Park, Windsor Square, or Beverly Hills. In the 1940s and 1950s, the block began to attract prominent Black families, including physicians, clergy, and educators, many of whom had previously faced housing discrimination. These included Dr. Ruth Janetta Temple, Dr. Perry Weldon Beal, Rev. Pearl C. Wood and Sweet Daddy Grace.

== Architecture and layout ==
The street featured a central landscaped median and buried utility lines. Lots averaged 10,000–15,000 square feet, each with a detached home designed in a range of styles including Beaux-Arts, Craftsman, Tudor Revival, and Mission Revival.

Architects who contributed to the block included:

- Elmer Grey and Myron Hunt (William R. Burke and Walter Leeds houses)
- Alfred F. Rosenheim (gate design and at least one residence)
- Arthur B. Benton (William Llewellyn house)
- Terwilliger & Whittlesey (Erle P. Halliburton house)
- Frank M. Tyler (Francis E. Bacon residence)
- Hunt & Burns (Lee A. Phillips 22-room residence)

== Freeway impact and demolition ==
Berkeley Square was selected as part of the route for the Santa Monica Freeway (I-10) in the late 1950s. Despite local objections, the state acquired all 22 homes through eminent domain.

Demolition began in 1961. The homes, street infrastructure, and gates were cleared to make way for freeway grading and onramps. Some of the southern portion of the former street was repurposed into school property. The loss of Berkeley Square reflected a broader pattern in Los Angeles, where freeway construction disproportionately displaced Black neighborhoods such as Sugar Hill and South Central Avenue.

== Legacy and recognition ==
No original structures remain, but Berkeley Square has been the focus of historical and preservationist interest. The blog Berkeley Square Los Angeles has documented the architectural and social history of the block. Historians have cited the neighborhood as an important case study in urban planning, displacement, and African American middle-class history in Los Angeles.
