= Second Church of Christ, Scientist (Long Beach, California) =

Historic church in California, United States

Coordinates: 33.775125°N 118.195431°W

- U.S. National Register of Historic Places
- Long Beach Historic Landmark
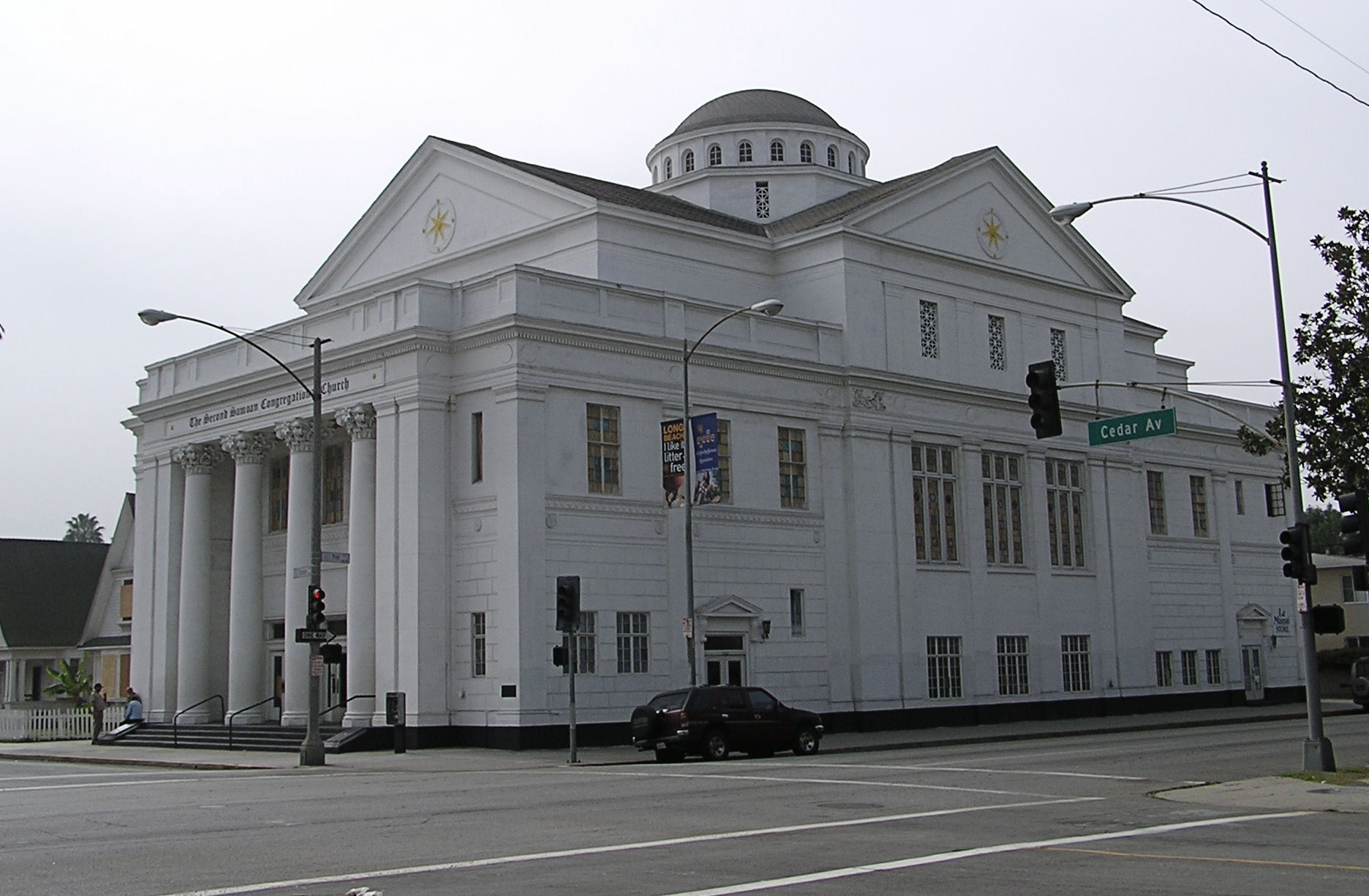
- Location: 655 Cedar Avenue; Long Beach, California
- Built: 1924
- Demolished: Damaged by Fire December 11, 2023 Temporarily Closed.
- NRHP reference No.: 05000212
- LBHL No.: 16.52.620
- Added to NRHP: April 1, 2005

The former Second Church of Christ, Scientist, located at 655 Cedar Avenue, in Long Beach, California, is an historic structure that on April 1, 2005, was added to the National Register of Historic Places. It is now the Second Samoan Church.

On December 11, 2023 a fire caused extensive damage to the building. As of December 12, the complex is closed to the public as church staff and authorities deal with the aftermath and proceeding investigations.

== National Register listing ==
- Second Church of Christ Scientist (added 2005 - Building - #05000212)
- Also known as Second Samoan Congregational Church
- 655 Cedar Ave., Long Beach
- Historic Significance: Architecture/Engineering
- Architect, builder, or engineer: Shields, Fisher and Lake
- Architectural Style: Classical Revival
- Area of Significance: Architecture
- Period of Significance: 1900-1924
- Owner: Private
- Historic Function: Education
- Historic Sub-function: School
- Current Function: Education
- Current Sub-function: School

== See also ==
- List of City of Long Beach Historic Landmarks
- List of Registered Historic Places in Los Angeles County, California
- List of former Christian Science churches, societies and buildings
- Second Church of Christ, Scientist (disambiguation)
- First Church of Christ, Scientist (Long Beach, California)
