= Second Church of Christ, Scientist (San Francisco) =

Church in San Francisco, California, United States

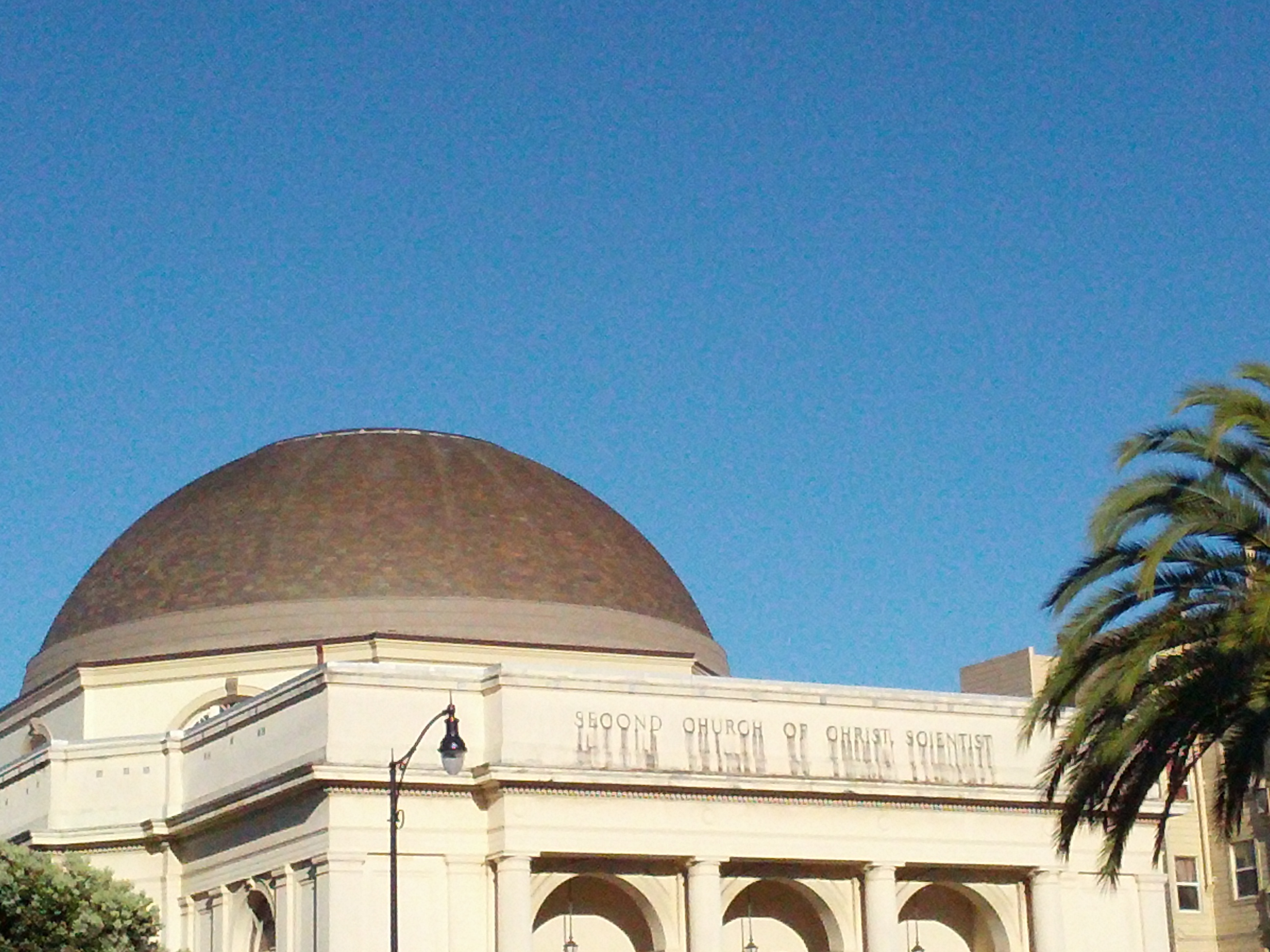
- Dome of the church before conversion

General information
- Architectural style: Classical Revival, Beaux Arts
- Location: 651 Dolores St. / 95 Cumberland St., San Francisco, California, United States
- Coordinates: 37.758854°N 122.425362°W
- Completed: 1916

Technical details
- Structural system: Unreinforced masonry building

Design and construction
- Architect: William H. Crim

The former Second Church of Christ, Scientist is an historic Christian Science church building located at the corner of Dolores Street and Cumberland Street, across from Dolores Park in the Mission District of San Francisco, California, United States. Built in 1916, it was designed by San Francisco architect William H. Crim in the Beaux Arts style and is a San Francisco city landmark. The building was sold in 2012, and conversion into four condominiums was completed in 2016.

== Building ==
Designed in a classical-derived Beaux Arts style, the building has a symmetrical facade with three doors, and large, arched windows. It had oak paneling and pews, marble steps and marble flooring in the lobby, and an organ that was brought from the 1915 Panama Pacific Exposition. The wood-framed truss system dome is one of two in San Francisco. The building was designated a San Francisco city landmark on September 11, 2026.

== Conversion ==
By 2008, the congregation had dwindled to fewer than 100 people, who could not afford to pay for mandatory seismic retrofitting of the 1000-seat church and proposed demolishing it to build a smaller church and condominium buildings on the site. After the city planning department recommended retaining the building for its historic value, it was put up for sale. In 2012 it was sold to commercial property developer Siamak Akhavan, who had previously bought and converted another church at 601 Dolores Street, now a school. The congregation moved to 2287 Mission Street.

In 2016, conversion of the building into four condominiums under the name the Light House was completed. Three units of approximately 5000 square feet are within the main body of the building. A slightly smaller penthouse was created under the dome, which was cut free and raised approximately ten feet to increase ceiling height and reveal the windows that circle the dome, with the oculus remaining in position suspended above the apartment. Akhavan himself moved into the penthouse. The four units share a private park. Garry Tan purchased one of the units in 2024 and has used it as an event space.

== See also ==
- List of former Christian Science churches, societies and buildings
- Second Church of Christ, Scientist (disambiguation)
