= Second Church of Christ, Scientist =

Second Church of Christ, Scientist may refer to any second Christian Science branch church in a given city, including but not limited to:

In Australia

- Second Church of Christ, Scientist (Melbourne, Victoria)

In the United States

- Second Church of Christ, Scientist (Long Beach, California)
- Second Church of Christ, Scientist (Los Angeles, California)
- Second Church of Christ, Scientist (San Francisco, California)
- Second Church of Christ, Scientist (New York, New York)
- Second Church of Christ, Scientist (Milwaukee, Wisconsin)

== See also ==
- First Church of Christ, Scientist (disambiguation)
