= List of National Historic Landmarks in Nevada =

Nevada National Historic Landmarks (clickable map)

The list of National Historic Landmarks in Nevada contains the landmarks designated by the U.S. Federal Government for the U.S. state of Nevada. There are 8 National Historic Landmarks (NHLs) in Nevada. The U.S. National Historic Landmark program is operated under the auspices of the National Park Service, and recognizes structures, districts, objects, and similar resources nationwide according to a list of criteria of national significance. Nevada is home to 8 of these landmarks, highlighting Nevada's frontier heritage and other themes. The National Historic Landmarks Survey: List of National Historic Landmarks by State lists seven landmarks, but includes the Leonard Rockshelter twice, and does not mention the Francis G. Newlands Home. However, the NHL Summary listing lists them correctly.

The table below lists all 8 of these sites, along with added detail and description.

== Key ==
	National Historic Landmark
^{†}	National Historic Landmark District
^{#}	National Historic Site, National Historical Park, National Memorial, or National Monument
^{*}	Delisted Landmark

== List ==
	Landmark name	Image	Date designated	Location	County	Description
1	Fort Churchill	Fort Churchill	November 5, 1961 (#66000456)	Weeks; 39°17′26″N 119°16′14″W	Lyon	Fort Churchill, named for Sylvester Churchill, was a U.S. Army fort built in 1861 to provide protection for early settlers
2	Fort Ruby	Fort Ruby	November 5, 1961 (#66000460)	Hobson; 40°04′04″N 115°31′46″W	White Pine	Fort built during the Civil War to protect links between the Union and California, via the Overland Trail. Landmark status is under review due to fire damage.
3	Hoover Dam	Hoover Dam	August 20, 1985 (#81000382)	Boulder City; 36°00′56″N 114°44′16″W	Clark (and Mohave County, Arizona)	Gravity-arch dam of the Colorado River. World's largest hydroelectric power producing facility and largest concrete structure, when completed in 1935.
4	Leonard Rockshelter		January 20, 1961 (#66000457)	Lovelock; 39°59′25″N 118°30′36″W	Pershing	Discovered in 1936, this is an archaeological site that shows settlement from 6700 BC up to 1400 AD.
5	McKeen Motor Car #70 (Virginia & Truckee Railway Motor Car #22)	McKeen Motor Car #70 (Virginia & Truckee Railway Motor Car #22)	October 16, 2012 (#05000968)	Carson City; 39°08′54″N 119°46′06″W		One of the few surviving McKeen railcars. Restored to operating condition in 2010.
6^{†}	Nevada Northern Railway, East Ely Yards	Nevada Northern Railway, East Ely Yards	September 20, 2006 (#93000693)	Ely; 39°15′34″N 114°52′11″W	White Pine	The Nevada Northern is one of the best-preserved early twentieth-century railroad shop complexes remaining in the United States.
7	Francis G. Newlands Home	Francis G. Newlands Home	May 23, 1963 (#66000459)	Reno; 39°31′18″N 119°49′11″W	Washoe	This was the home of Francis G. Newlands from 1890 until his death in 1917, including his tenure in the House of Representatives and Senate. Newlands is known for the Reclamation Act of 1902, under which the U.S. government led the massive development of irrigation in the West.
8^{†}	Virginia City Historic District	Virginia City Historic District	July 4, 1961 (#66000458)	Virginia City; 39°18′37″N 119°38′58″W	Lyon and Storey	Virginia City was a prototype for frontier mining boom towns, owing its success to the 1859 discovery of Comstock Lode.

== See also ==
- National Register of Historic Places listings in Nevada
- List of National Historic Landmarks by state
- List of National Natural Landmarks in Nevada
