= Francis G. Newlands Home =

Historic house in Nevada, United States

- U.S. National Register of Historic Places
- U.S. National Historic Landmark
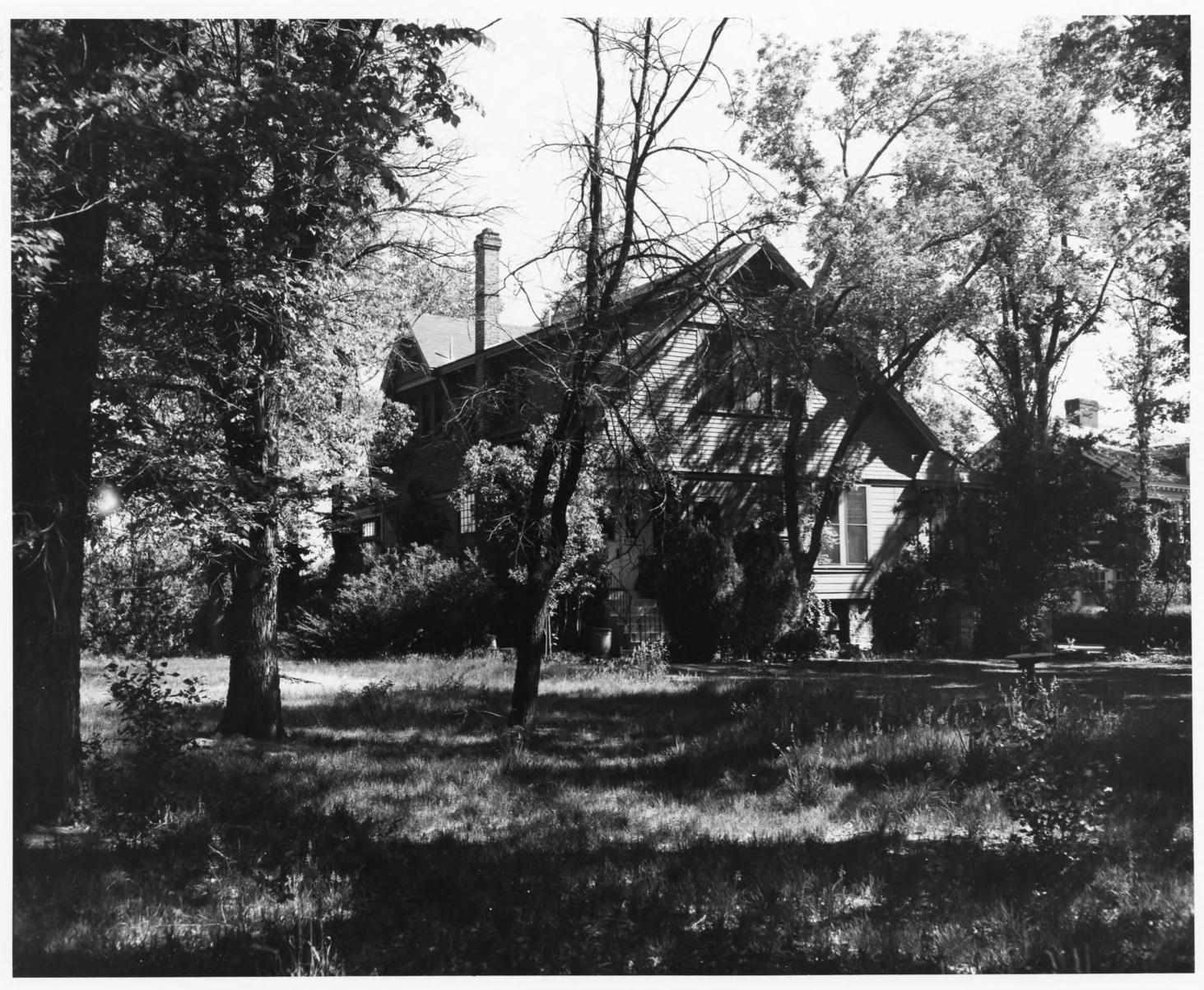
- Francis G. Newlands Home in 1961

- Location within Nevada Location within the United States
- Location: 7 Elm Court, Reno, Nevada
- Coordinates: 39°31′18.37″N 119°49′10.09″W
- Area: 2 acres (0.81 ha)
- Built: 1890
- Architectural style: Shingle style Queen Anne
- NRHP reference No.: 66000459

Significant dates
- Added to NRHP: October 15, 1966
- Designated NHL: May 23, 1963

The Francis G. Newlands Home is a historic house at 7 Elm Court in Reno, Nevada, United States. Built in 1890, it is the mansion of former United States Senator Francis G. Newlands (1846–1917), a driving force in passage of the 1902 Newlands Reclamation Act. It was declared a National Historic Landmark in 1963 and listed on the National Register of Historic Places in 1966. The house is privately owned and is not open to the public.

== Description ==
The Francis G. Newlands Home is located in a residential area on the south side of the Truckee River southwest of downtown Reno, at the end of Elm Court, a short spur off the western end of Court Street. This area was a particularly fashionable residential area in the late 19th century. The house stands on about 2 acres (0.81 ha) overlooking the river to the north. It is a two-story wood-frame structure, roughly rectangular in footprint, with a gable roof and the then-fashionable Shingle Style exterior. Queen Anne characteristics of the house include a variety of protrusions, projections and gables. A front wing and an arbor were added sometime before 1908.

The house was the first mansion built on a bluff overlooking the Truckee River in Reno, which became known as Newlands Heights. Diverse architectural styles are represented in the area, as exemplified also by the colonial revival Hawkins House next door, another mansion listed on the National Register of Historic Places.

Francis G. Newlands had this house built in 1890, not long after he moved to Reno from San Francisco, California. He was then managing the complex affairs of his first wife's family; she was the daughter of William Sharon, who had made his fortune in the Comstock Lode silver business. He began service in the United States House of Representatives in 1893 before winning election to the Senate in 1902. He was instrumental in advancing the Reclamation Act, which put the federal government in the business of providing irrigation infrastructure in place to facilitate agricultural development of the rural west. Later in his career he also played in important role in securing legislation that reorganized the way railroads were managed.

After Newlands' death, the house was purchased by divorce lawyer George Thatcher in 1920. His client Barbara Hutton, heiress of the F.W. Woolworth Company, stayed in the house in 1935, as did other Thatcher clients from time to time.

== See also ==
- List of National Historic Landmarks in Nevada
- National Register of Historic Places listings in Washoe County, Nevada
