= Sixth Church of Christ, Scientist =

Sixth Church of Christ, Scientist may refer to any sixth Christian Science branch church in a given city, including but not limited to:

- Sixth Church of Christ, Scientist (Seattle, Washington)
- Sixth Church of Christ, Scientist (Milwaukee, Wisconsin)
- Sixth Church of Christ, Scientist (Portland, Oregon)

== See also ==
- First Church of Christ, Scientist (disambiguation)
