= Hawkins House (Reno, Nevada) =

Historic house in Nevada, United States

- U.S. National Register of Historic Places
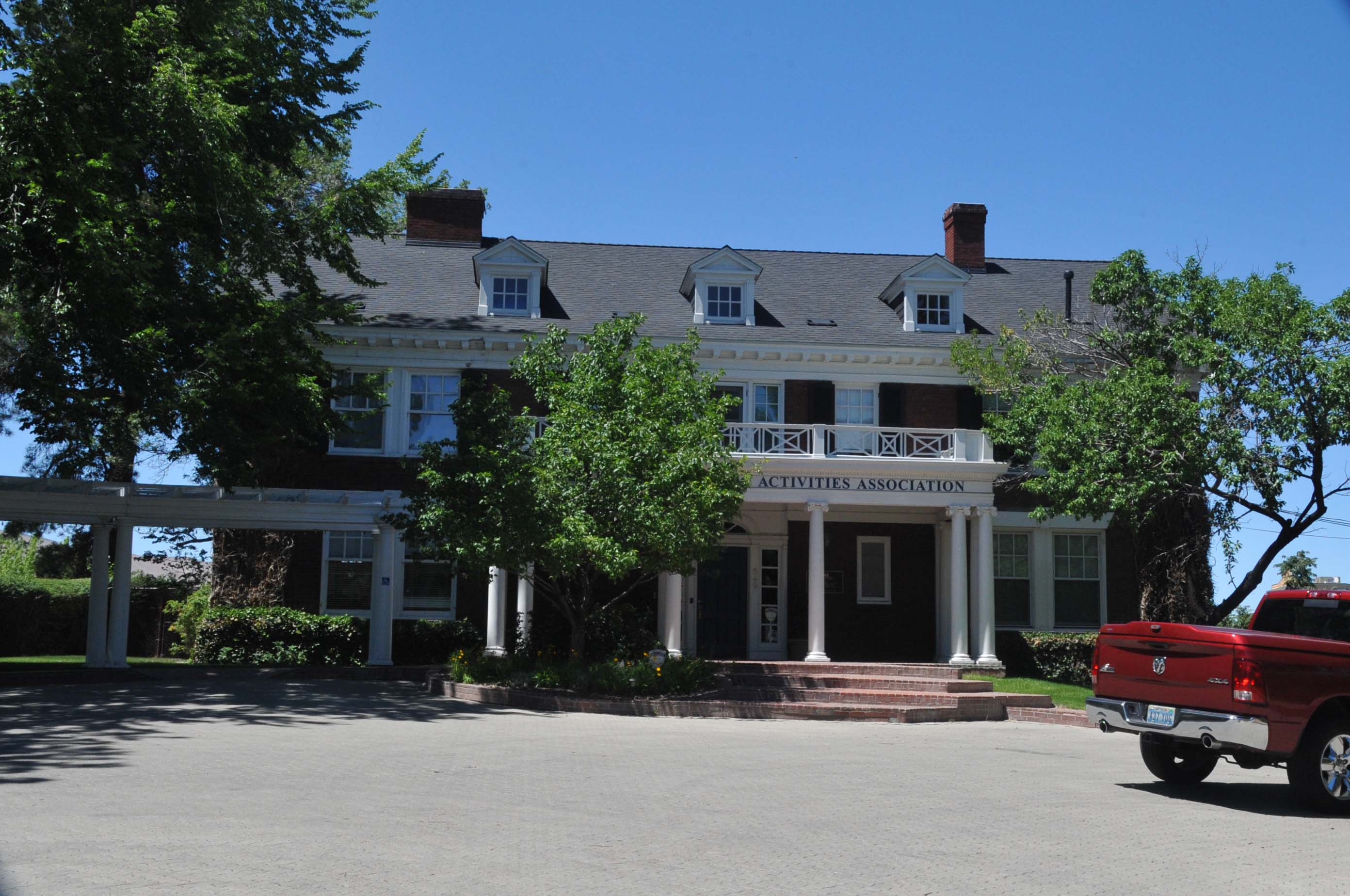

- Location within Nevada Location within the United States
- Location: 549 Court St., Reno, Nevada
- Coordinates: 39°31′19.29″N 119°49′6.59″W
- Built: 1911
- Architect: Elmer Grey
- Architectural style: Colonial Revival
- NRHP reference No.: 79001465
- Added to NRHP: December 17, 1979

Hawkins House, later known as Sierra Nevada Museum of Art, is a historic home in Reno, Nevada. It was designed in a colonial revival style by Elmer Grey for Prince A. Hawkins, a scion of the well-established Hawkins family, in 1911. It is now the offices of the Nevada Interscholastic Activities Association (NIAA).

It is adjacent to the Francis G. Newlands House, a National Historic Landmark.

From 1978 to 1988, the building housed the Sierra Nevada Museum of Art, now known as the Nevada Museum of Art.
