= Elmer Grey =

American architect and artist (1872–1963)

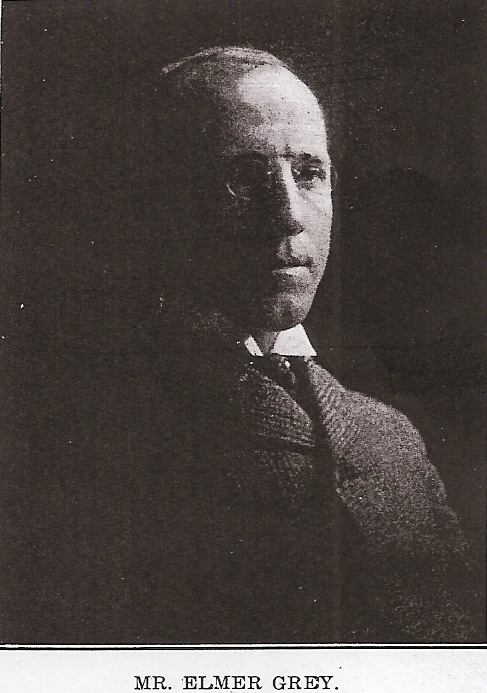
- Born: April 29, 1872; Chicago, Illinois, U.S.
- Died: November 14, 1963 (aged 91); Pasadena, California, U.S.
- Occupation: Architect
- Buildings: Beverly Hills Hotel; Huntington Art Gallery; Pasadena Playhouse; Wattles Mansion

Elmer Grey, FAIA (April 29, 1872 – November 14, 1963) was an American architect and artist based in Pasadena, California. Grey designed many noted landmarks in Southern California, including the Beverly Hills Hotel, the Huntington Art Gallery, the Pasadena Playhouse, and Wattles Mansion. He is credited with being one of the pioneers in the development of the new American architecture in the early 20th century, with a focus on harmony with nature and eliminating features not belonging to the local climate and conditions. Grey was also a noted artist whose paintings are in the permanent collection of the Chicago Art Institute.

== Architectural career ==
=== Career in the Midwest ===
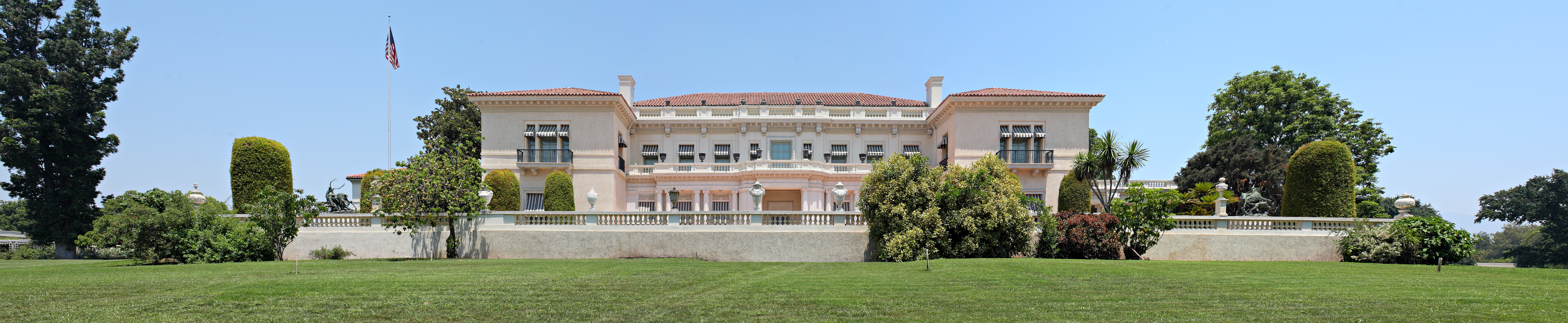
Henry Huntington House in San Marino, designed by Hunt and Grey

Grey was born in Chicago and educated in the Milwaukee public schools. He did not attend college and worked for the Milwaukee architectural firm Ferry & Clas from 1887 to 1899. In 1890, the 18-year-old Grey won first prize in a competition for the design of a water tower and pumping station sponsored by a New York architectural publication. While at Ferry & Clas, he assisted in the design of the Milwaukee Central Library and the Wisconsin Historical Society in Madison, Wisconsin. When Grey went into practice on his own, he first attracted attention for his design of a summer home he built for himself on a bluff overlooking Lake Michigan at Fox Point, Wisconsin. Grey's Fox Point house was a great hit, being published widely in magazines and leading to Grey's elevation to Fellow of the American Institute of Architects.

=== Health problems ===
Another major commission during his years in Wisconsin was the Sixth Church of Christian Science in Milwaukee. It was shortly after those plans were finished that Grey later recalled that "my health broke down completely." Grey wrote that his health problems had more to do with "nerves" rather than anything purely physical. Grey abandoned his Milwaukee practice and traveled to Florida, Philadelphia, and then to Las Vegas, seeking to regain his health. He took up work on a ranch, hoping the hard work would build his strength. He eventually moved to California, spending time swimming, rowing, playing tennis, and fishing on Catalina Island. When he read of a job working on a Hollywood citrus ranch for $25 a month plus board, he took the position.

=== Partnership with Myron Hunt ===
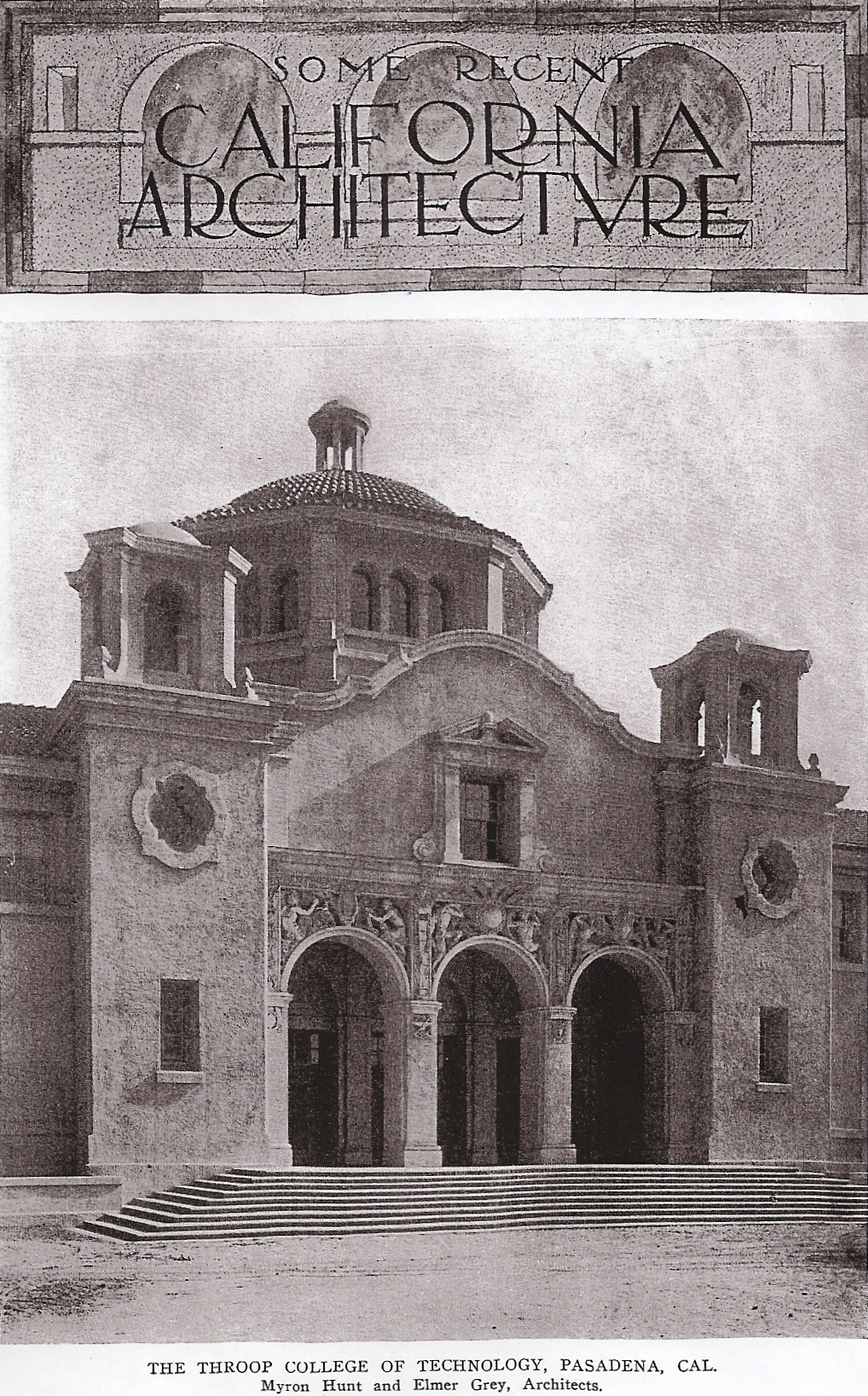
Throop College, as featured in The Architectural Record

In 1904, Grey became friends with a fellow Midwestern architect, Myron Hunt. The two rode horses together on Sunday mornings in Pasadena and formed a partnership in that city as Hunt & Grey. Grey later wrote that he began by working only a short time each day "until my nerves got in better shape." Grey's health again failed during the early years of his partnership with Hunt, and he took a long trip to the South Sea Islands. Yet, it was during his partnership with Hunt that Grey produced some of his finest work. The two designed fine residences for the wealthy of Pasadena and also worked on larger projects, including schools, churches, and hotels. In 1905, The Architectural Record published articles on both Grey and Hunt, noting: "Both Mr. Hunt and Mr. Grey stand for the attempt to naturalize in this country the best traditions of European architecture. Mr. Grey, for instance, believes that a very genuine American style is in the process of making; but that as yet it is only in its infancy."

From 1907 to 1908, Hunt & Grey designed a Beaux Arts mansion for railroad and finance magnate Henry Huntington in San Marino. The mansion, built with reinforced concrete, tile walls, and a slab roof, was not completed until 1911. In his book Houses of Los Angeles Sam Watters wrote that the Huntington structure was "unique in Los Angeles for the ambition of its house." While a French influence was requested by Mrs. Huntington, Hunt & Grey also added elements of a new California architecture by including a red-tile roof, unornamented plaster walls, and sage green window trim. The Huntington mansion was later converted into the main art gallery of the cultural center built around the Huntington Library.

Hunt & Grey's larger commissions included work for Throop Institute in Pasadena, the school which would soon become California Institute of Technology. In 1911, they began plans for the new campus of Occidental College in the Eagle Rock district of Los Angeles. They also designed a dormitory and other structures for Claremont College and a master expansion plan for Pomona College.

=== Association with the Arts and Crafts movement ===
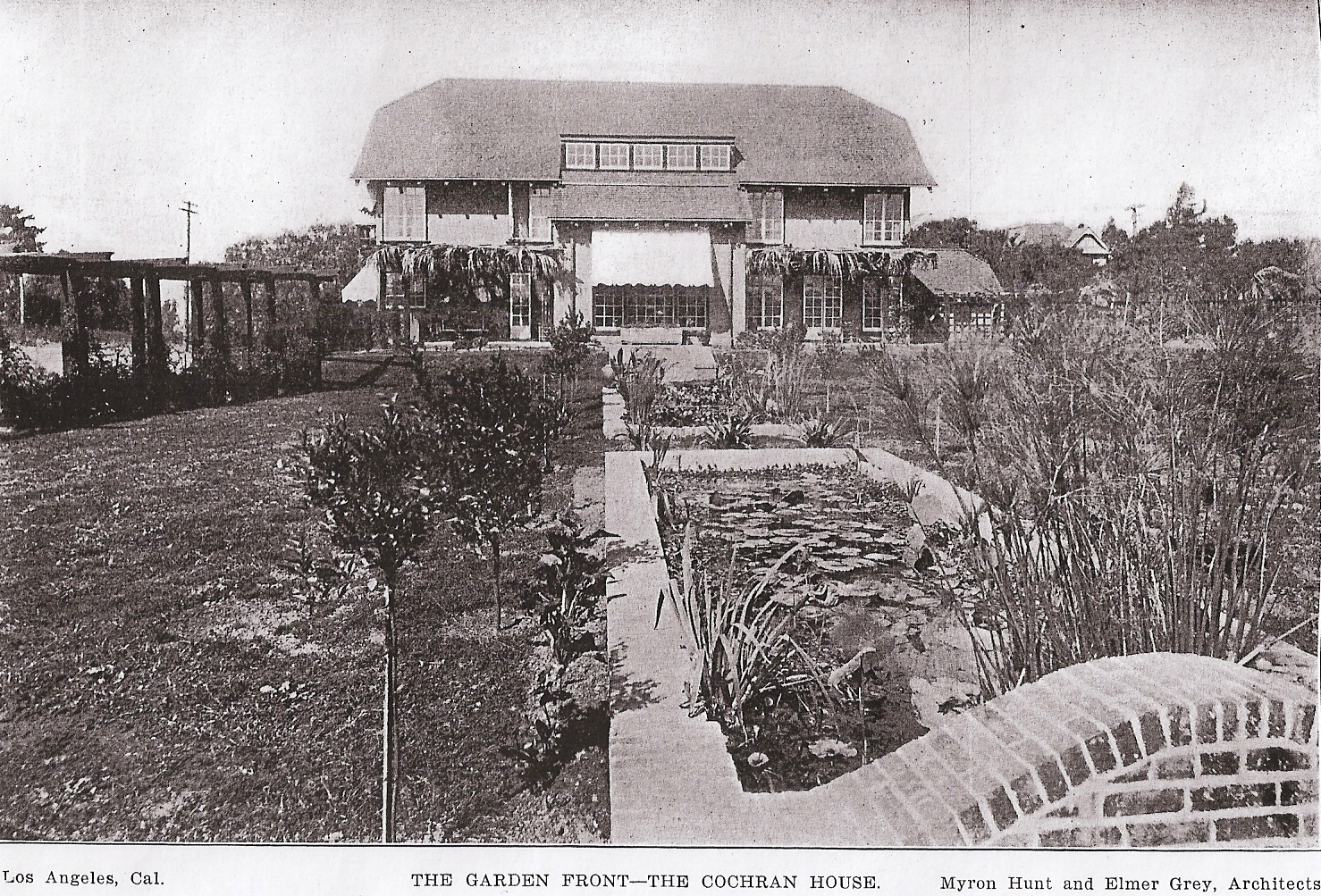
Hunt & Grey's design of Cochran House was praised by Gustav Stickley's The Craftsman

In 1906, Hunt & Grey designed a home for Dr. Guy Cochran near Downtown Los Angeles that Gustav Stickley's The Craftsman magazine dubbed the "very best" of their work, with enormous windows "looking out upon the terrace and garden, giv[ing] such a sense of relationship between the two that there is almost no feeling of being enclosed within walls." The Craftsman referred to Hunt & Grey as "pioneers in the development of the new American architecture", which was "but a series of individual plans adapted to the climatic conditions and to the needs of daily living" and in harmony "with the natural environment and contour of the landscape." The house reflected Grey's vision of California bungalow architecture, which he described in 1907 as follows:

"The best California bungalow schemes involve a garden or large outdoor living space, incorporated as an integral part of the plan. By this we mean that the main rooms of the house are arranged to face this out-of-door living space ... It was once considered absurd to plan a house with the kitchen toward the street, but now not so in California ... the street side of [a man's] domicile is merely the side through which he enters."

In 1910, as the American Craftsman movement was in full bloom in Southern California, Grey wrote that California architecture was distinctive because local architects were simply trying to be "natural"—not so much "because our architects have striven to be unique in their designing as because they have tried to eliminate features not belonging to this climate and to local conditions." Grey also emphasized simplicity, once writing that "the greatest fault that can be found with the architecture of Southern California is that which may be found with all American architecture to a greater or lesser extent, namely, a lack of simplicity."

Though often associated with the Craftsman movement, Grey's structures reflect a wide variety of styles, including Beaux Arts, Mission Revival, and English Tudor. One Grey biographer wrote: "While Grey shared a number of beliefs with Stickley and the Arts and Crafts movement, his catholic, traditionalist taste and disposition would not allow him to become an exponent of any one movement. The woodsy, informal image of the Arts and Crafts house was simply one of many that he might employ. ike Charles and Henry Greene, he transformed the low-art Arts and Crafts dwelling into a sophisticated high-art object."

=== Later career ===
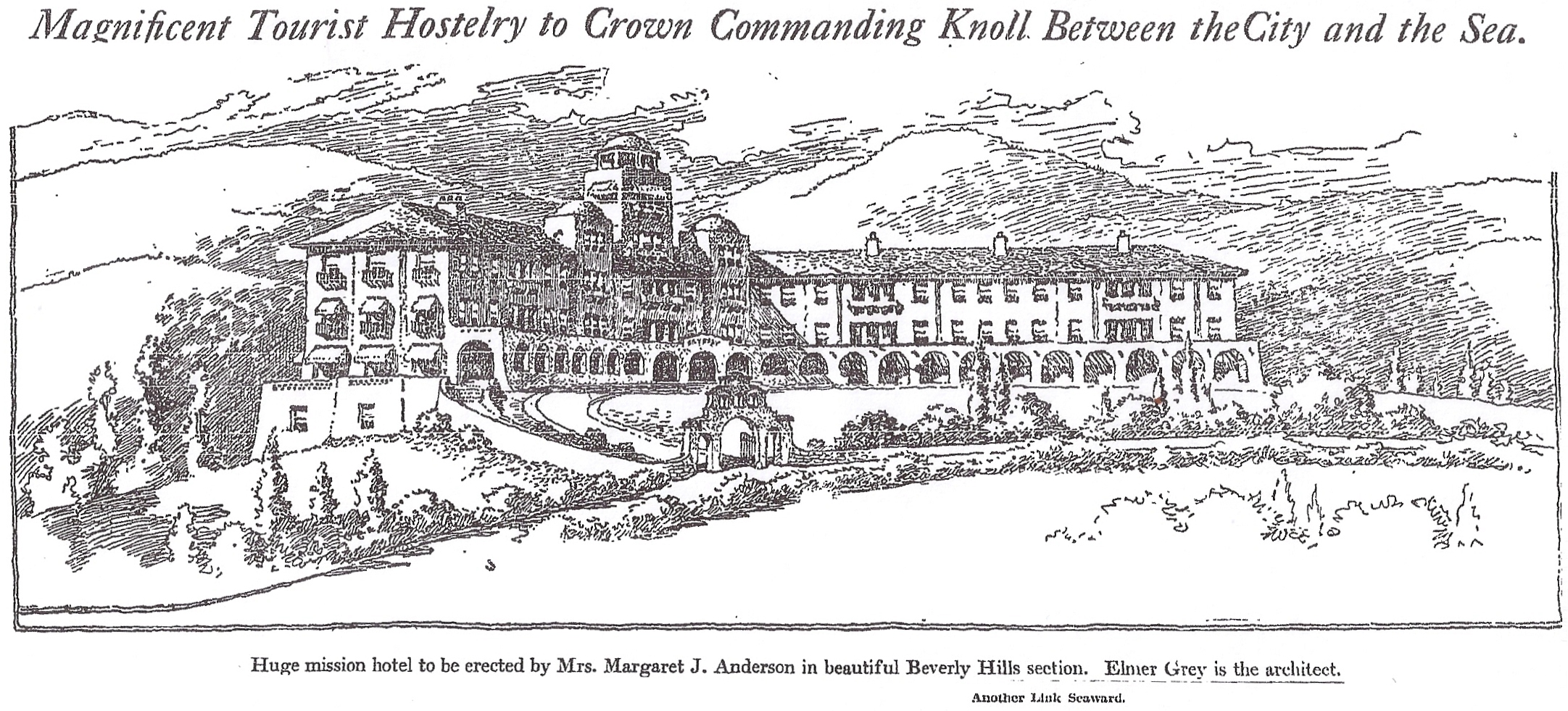
Beverly Hills Hotel, 1911 drawing

After his partnership with Hunt dissolved in 1910 or 1911, Grey went on to design the Pasadena Playhouse, the Beverly Hills Hotel, the Lincoln Shrine in Redlands, three buildings for the First Church of Christ Scientist, and many residences. After completing his first Christian Science church, Grey published an article about church design in which he wrote:

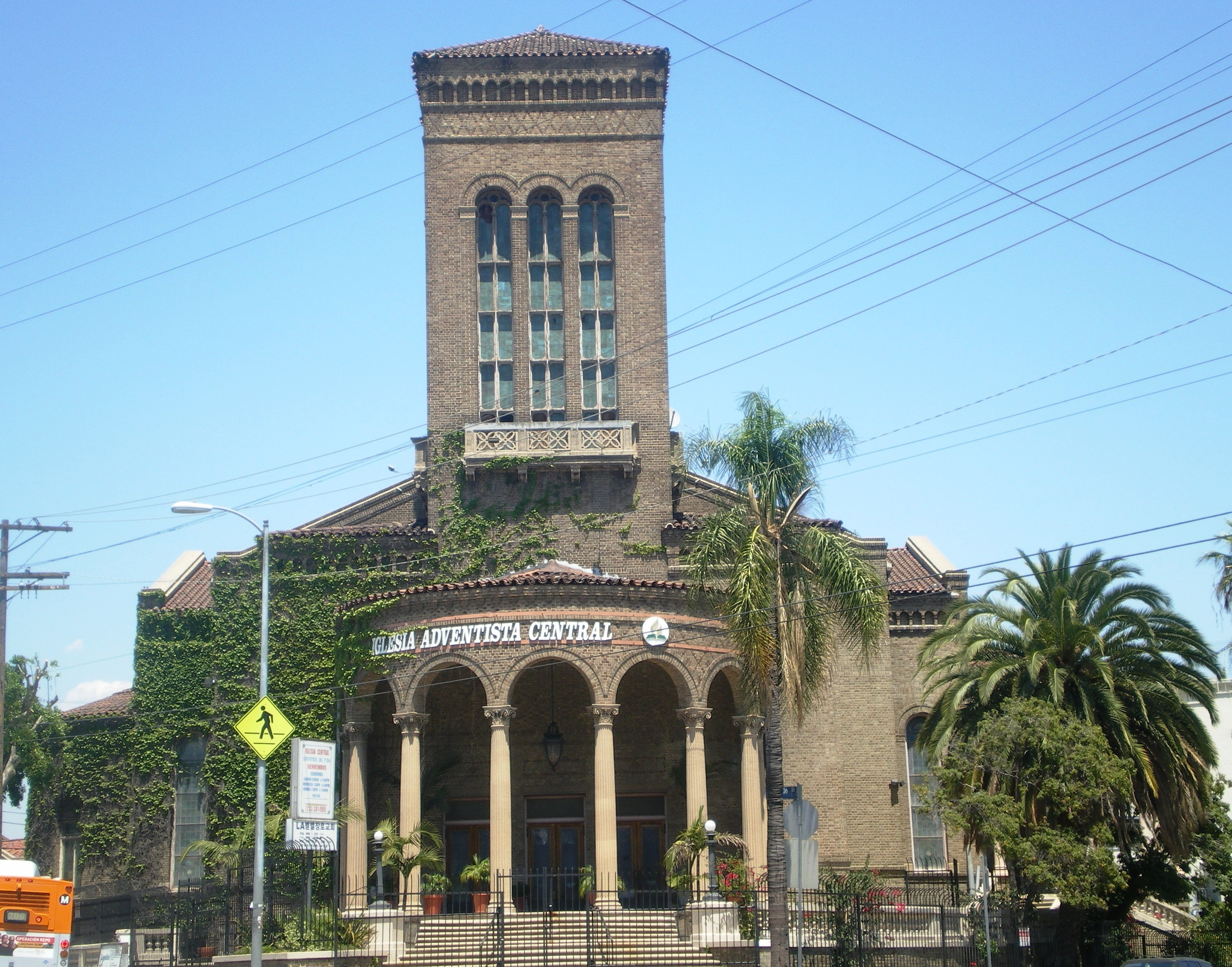
First Church of Christ, Scientist, later used by Jim Jones and the Peoples Temple

"The commercial spirit of our age is so inclined to be a mad race for the 'almighty dollar,' and commercial structures are so often built with the idea of obtaining the most show for the least money that when religious organizations build they should show that their aims are higher. The trend of preachment or sermon in all churches is for the things of lasting value, the real as against the seeming; so when a church builds, it should show that it believes in putting such preachments into practice, that it demands the real in architecture instead of that which only seems so."

The church Grey designed for the First Church of Christ, Scientist in Los Angeles was later used by Jim Jones and his Peoples Temple immediately prior to the 1978 Jonestown tragedy.

== Artist and author ==
Grey was also an artist who painted in both oils and watercolors. He painted Southern California landscapes, and his watercolors are on permanent exhibit at the Chicago Art Institute. Grey also wrote numerous articles on architecture and philosophy.

For several years in the 1920s, Grey's nervous condition again forced him to cease working as an architect, though he returned to his practice in 1929. During the 1930s, he also tried to obtain work as a set designer in Hollywood.

Grey moved his practice to Florida in 1941, where he was an instructor in mechanical drawing and also painted a 35-foot frieze at the Naval Air Station in Jacksonville, Florida, depicting five episodes in the history and development of Florida. Grey later returned to Pasadena in his retirement; he died in November 1963 at age 91 in the Pasadena mansion he had built for himself.

== Grey's architectural works ==
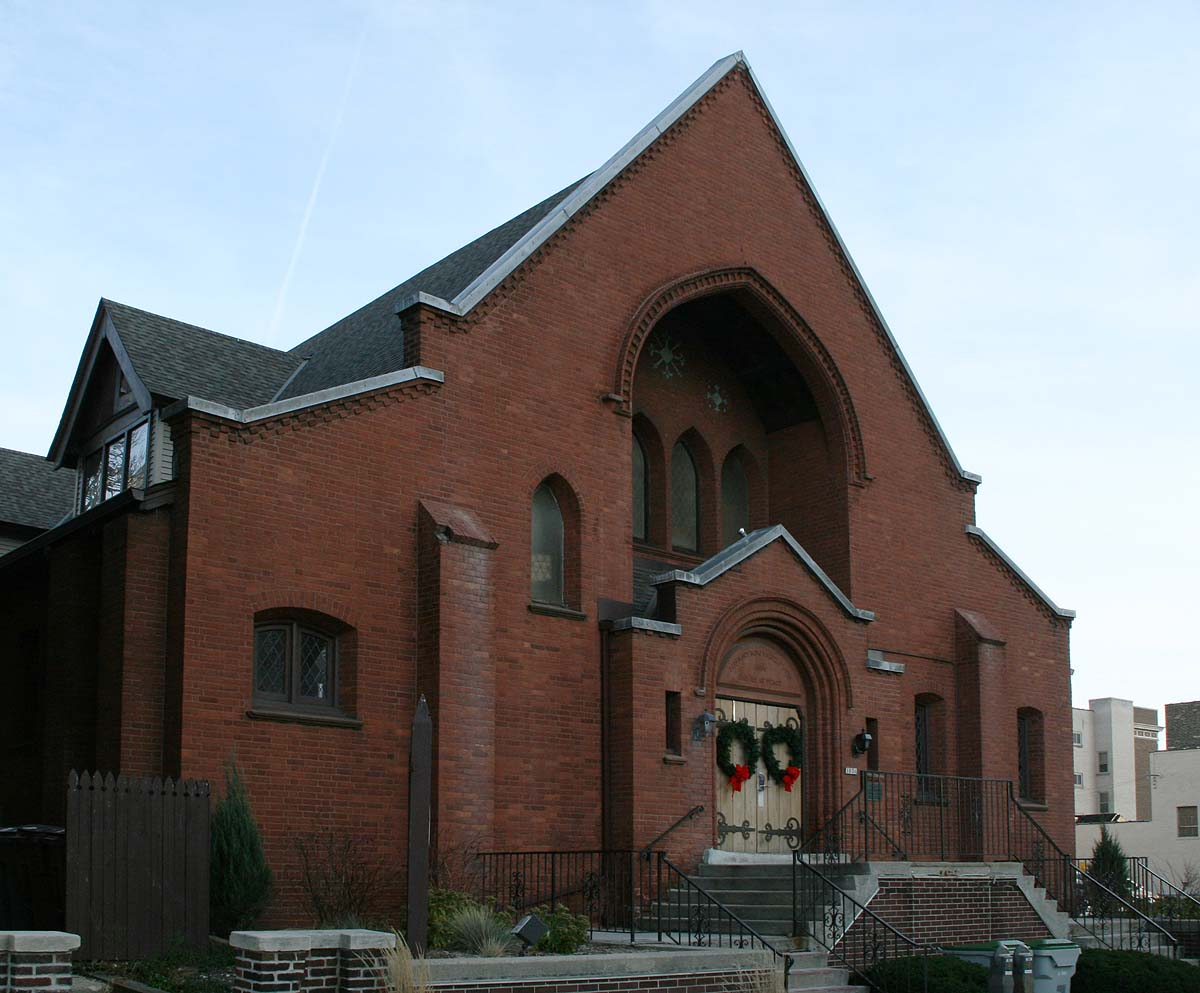
Sixth Church of Christ, Scientist (Milwaukee, Wisconsin) 1902

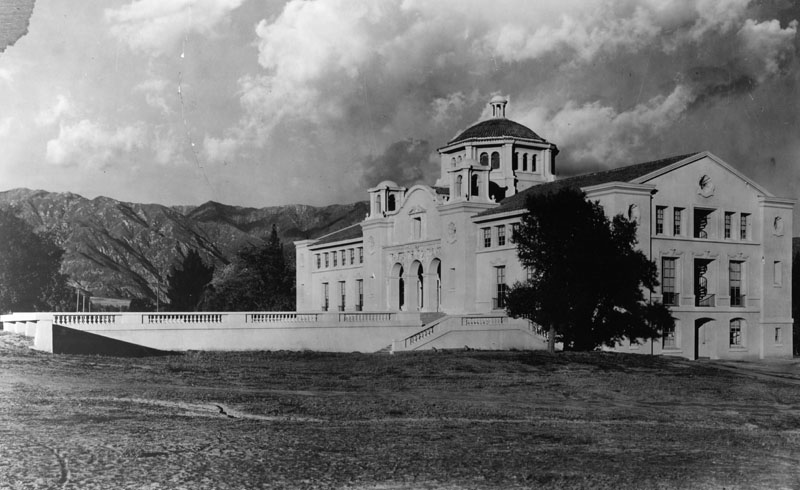
Throop Hall, Pasadena

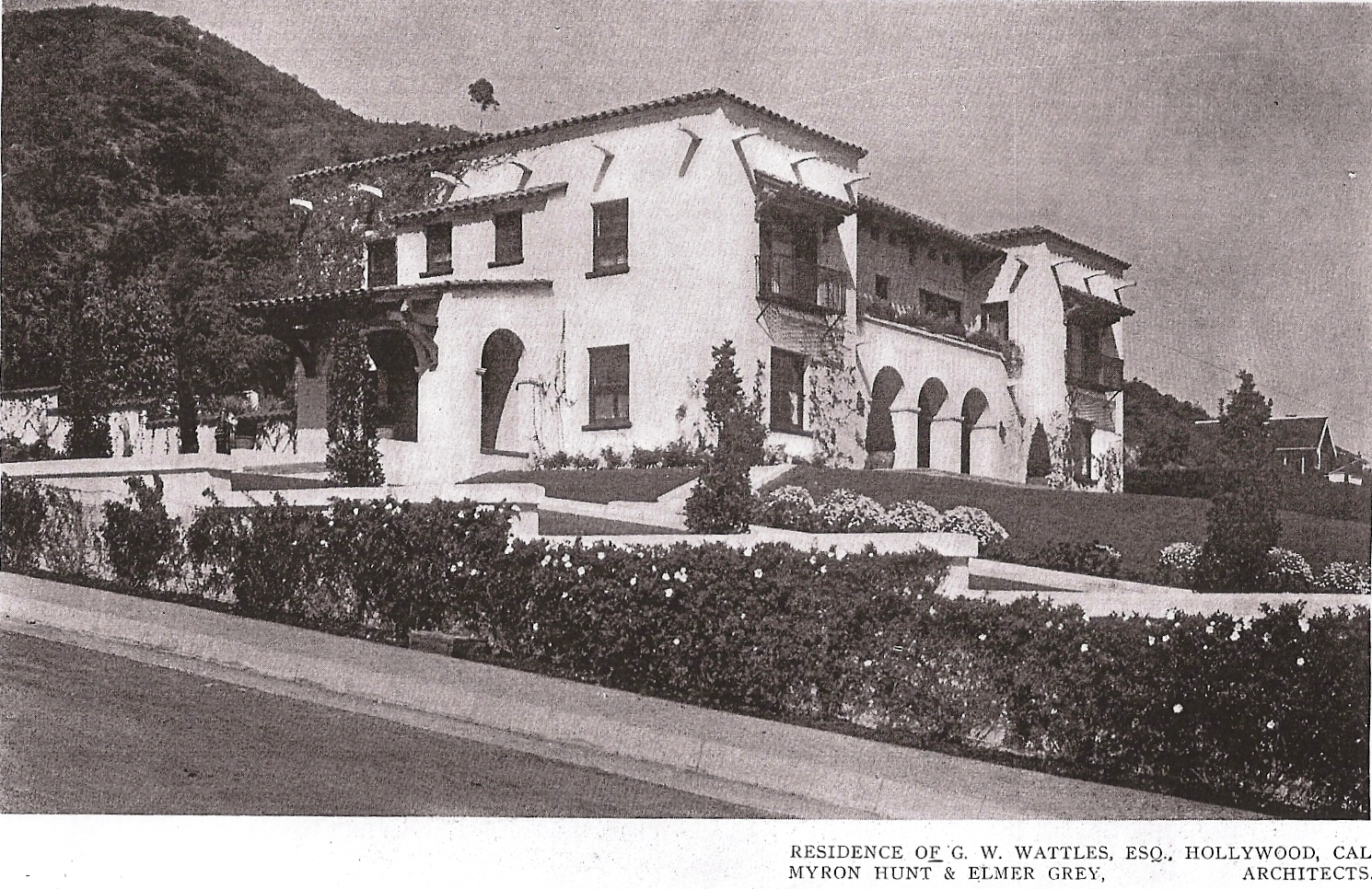
Wattles Mansion, Hollywood

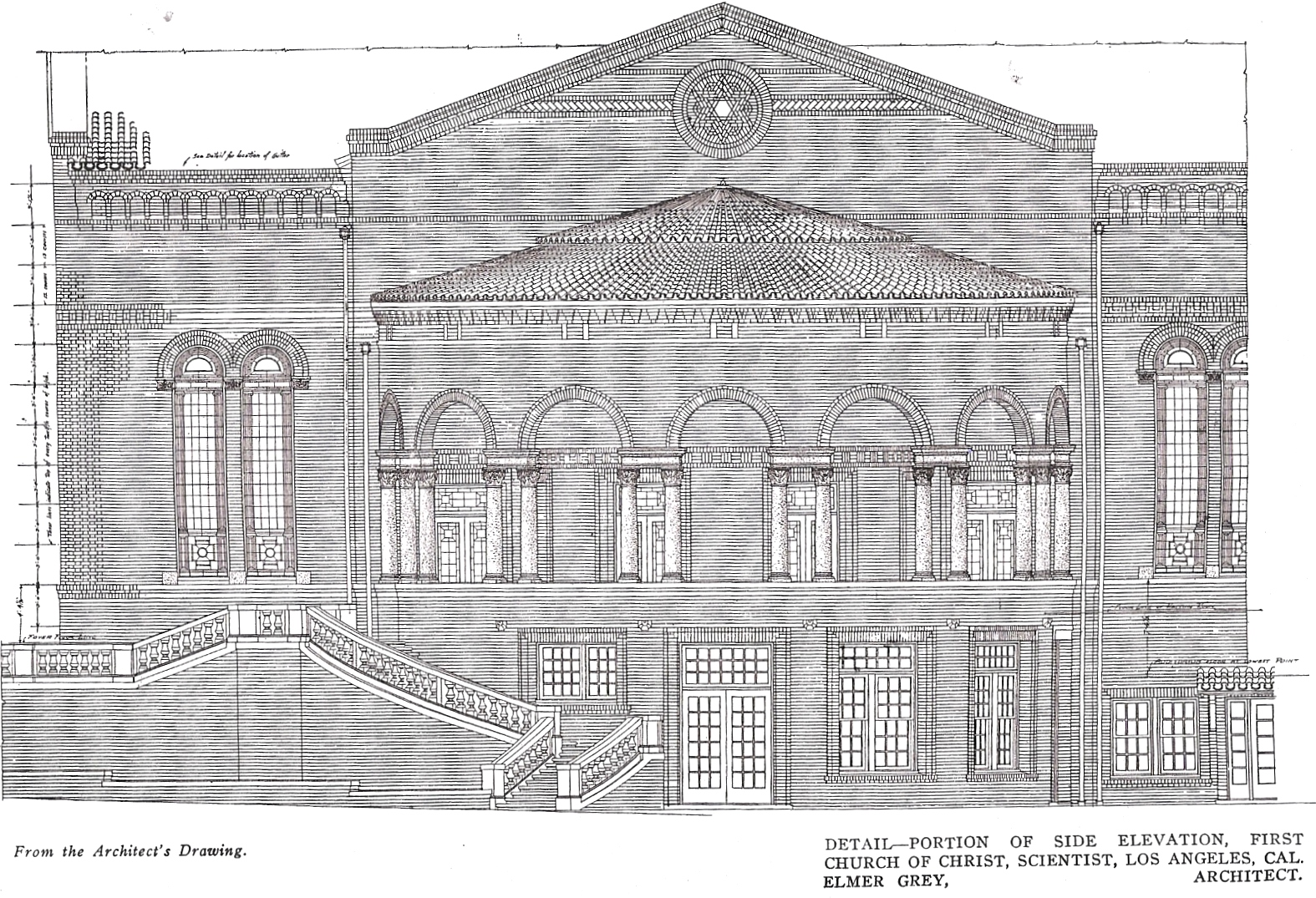
Architectural drawing of the side view at First Church of Christ, Scientist. Los Angeles

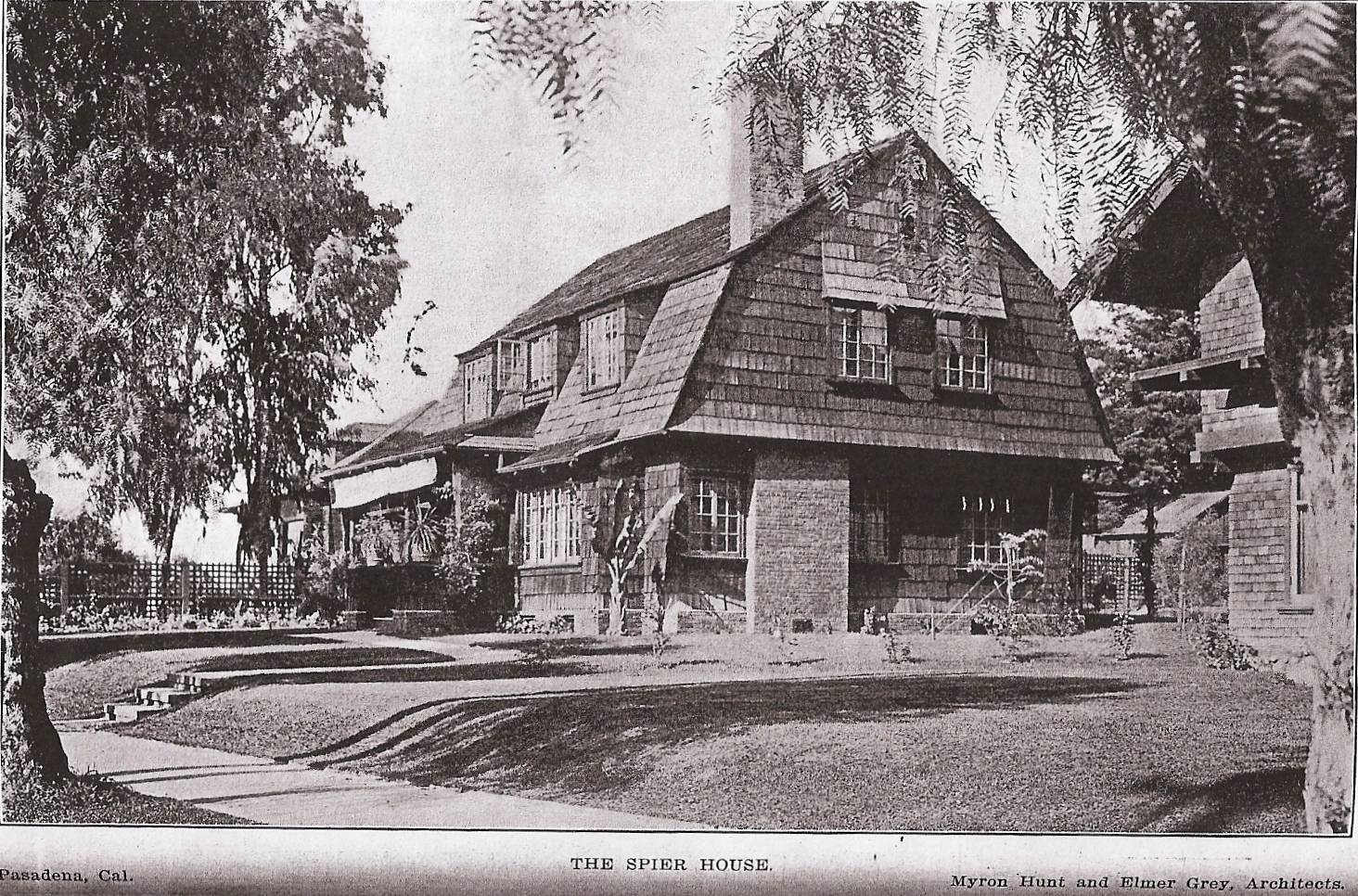
Spier House, Pasadena

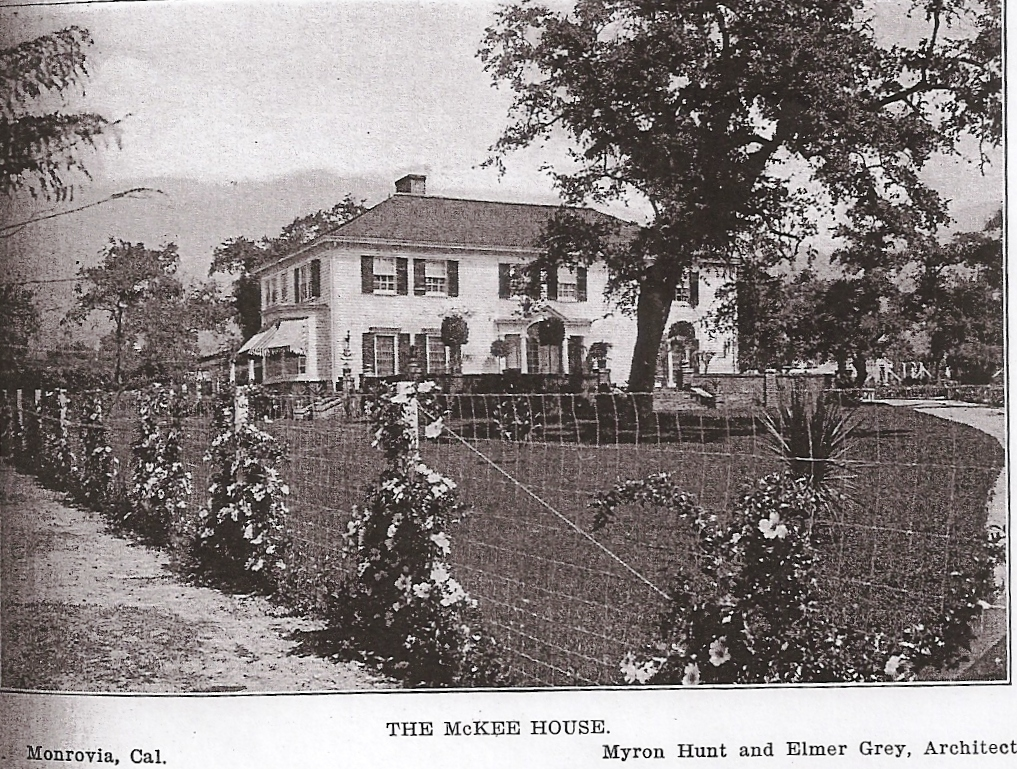
McKee House, Monrovia

Grey's major works include:

=== To 1906 ===
- Sixth Church of Christ, Scientist, Milwaukee, Wisconsin, on the NRHP in Milwaukee
- Edith Daniels House, Arcadia, CA (1904)
- Livingston Jenks House, San Rafael, CA (1904)
- Astronomer's House (aka The Monastery) and other buildings, Mount Wilson Observatory, Mount Wilson, CA (1904) (with Myron Hunt)
- Thomas H. Foote House, East Colorado Street, Pasadena, CA (1905) (with Myron Hunt)
- J.W. Gillespie House, Montecito, CA (with Myron Hunt)
- Livingston Jenks House, 1000 Vallejo, Russian Hill, San Francisco, CA (1905)
- Ingraham Hotel, Ingraham and Orange Streets, Los Angeles, CA (1906–08) (with Myron Hunt)
- Dr. Guy H. Cochran House, Loma Drive, Los Angeles (1906) (with Myron Hunt)
- Henry E. Huntington Cottage, Clifton, CA (between Redondo and San Pedro) (1906) (with Myron Hunt)

=== 1907 ===
- Paine House, Pasadena, CA (1907) (with Myron Hunt)
- L.H. Nares House, Beverly Hills, CA (1907) (with Myron Hunt)
- Wattles Mansion, 1824 N. Curson Ave., Hollywood, Los Angeles, CA (1907)
- Valley Hunt Clubhouse, South Orange Grove and Palmetto Avenues, Pasadena, CA (1907) (with Myron Hunt)
- Walter Ransome Leeds House, Berkeley Square, Los Angeles, CA (1907) (with Myron Hunt)
- Chester Montgomery House, Berkeley Square, Los Angeles, CA (1907) (with Myron Hunt)
- William R. Burke House, Berkeley Square, Los Angeles, CA (1907) (with Myron Hunt)
- Polytechnic Elementary School, Pasadena, CA (1907) (with Myron Hunt) and addition (1912–1913)
- Arthur Herbert Woodward House (now the Zane Grey Estate), Altadena, CA (1907) (with Myron Hunt)

=== 1908-1910 ===
- William R. Nash House, N. Orange Grove Blvd. near San Rafael Bridge, Pasadena, CA (1908) (with Myron Hunt)
- A.S. Gaylord House, San Rafael Heights, Pasadena, CA (1908) (with Myron Hunt)
- Throop Polytechnic Institute, Campus Plan, Pasadena, CA (1908) (with Myron Hunt)
- Dr. J.A. Scherer House (Pres. of Throop Polytechnic), Pasadena, CA (1908) (with Myron Hunt)
- Men's Dormitory and other buildings at Claremont College, Pomona, CA (1908) (with Myron Hunt)
- Henry Huntington House, later converted into the Huntington Library and Art Museum, San Marino, CA (1908) (with Myron Hunt)
- Throop Hall, Pasadena, CA (1909) (with Myron Hunt)
- Throop Polytechnic Institute, Pasadena Hall, Pasadena, CA (1908–10)
- Edward D. Libbey House, Ojai, California (1909) (with Myron Hunt)
- Edward M. Taylor House (aka "Ferndale"), Altadena, CA (with Myron Hunt) (destroyed by fire in 1943)
- Gartz Court, Pasadena, CA, (1910) (with Myron Hunt) on the NRHP in Pasadena
- E.M. Neustadt Mansion, West Adams St. and Western Ave., West Adams, Los Angeles (1910) (with Myron Hunt)
- Dormitories at Occidental College, Eagle Rock, Los Angeles, CA, and Throop Polytechnic (1910) (with Myron Hunt)
- J.N. Burnes House, El Molino and Pinehurst, Oak Knoll, Pasadena, CA (1910) (with Myron Hunt)

=== 1911-1920 ===
- Addison Lysle House, Garfield Ave. and El Monte Rd., Alhambra, CA (1911)
- Beverly Hills Hotel, Beverly Hills, CA (1911)
- Hawkins House, Reno, NV (1911)
- Julius Seyler Bungalow, South Pasadena, California (1911–1912)
- First Church of Christ, Scientist, Alvarado Terrace, Los Angeles, CA (1911)
- First Church of Christ Scientist, Long Beach, CA (1913)
- Robert C. Gillis House, Santa Monica, CA (1913)
- First Congregational Church of Riverside, CA, 1913, (with Myron Hunt) on the NRHP in Riverside County
- E.M. Neustadt House, Altadena, CA (1913)
- Dr. Clifford Webster Barnes House, 999 S. San Rafael Ave., Pasadena, CA (1913)
- Elmer Grey House, 1372 S. El Molino Ave., Pasadena, CA (1912)
- W. Sias House, Oak Knoll, Pasadena, CA (1912–13)
- John Luckenbach House, Hillhurst Park, Hollywood, CA (1914)
- Eldridge Merrick Lyon House, Redlands, CA (1916)
- First Church of Christ Scientist, 661 Bryant Street, Palo Alto, CA (1916)
- Rew-Sharp House, Coronado, CA (1918)
- Stafford W. Bixby House, Hillhurst Park, Hollywood, CA (1919)

=== 1921 on ===
- Harvey Mudd House, Benedict Canyon Drive, Beverly Hills, CA (1922)
- Pico Heights Branch Library, Connecticut and Oxford Streets, Los Angeles, CA (1923)
- Pasadena Playhouse, Pasadena, CA (1924)
- Bowen House, 336 Hudson Ave., Hancock Park, Los Angeles CA (1925)
- Colony Club, Santa Monica, CA (1925)
- R.H. Cromwell House, Bel Air, Los Angeles CA (1925)
- A.N. Kemp House, Canyon Vista Park, overlooking Santa Monica Canyon and Brentwood Country Club (1925)
- Bel-Air Bay Club, 16801 Pacific Coast Highway Pacific Palisades, Los Angeles, CA (1927)
- Charles J. Wild House, Fremont Place, Los Angeles, CA (1930)
- Lincoln Shrine, Redlands, CA (1932)
- Charles J. Wild House, Altadena, CA (c. 1932)
- Mrs. J.M. Goss Studio, Pasadena, Ca (c. 1932)
- Margaret Coleman Studio, S. Madison Ave., Pasadena, CA (1933)

== Selected published works ==
- "'A New Movement in American Architecture': Is It a Healthful One?" (1900)
- The planning of Christian Science church edifices (1916)
