= List of National Natural Landmarks in Nevada =

There are 6 National Natural Landmarks in Nevada.

Nevada National Natural Landmarks (clickable map)

Name	Image	Date	Location	County	Ownership	Description
Berlin–Ichthyosaur State Park		1973	38.874722°N 117.589722°W	Nye	state park	Site containing fossil remains of 37 of the largest forms of Ichthyosaur.
Hot Creek Springs and Marsh		1972	38.399437°N 115.132262°W	Nye	state	An outstanding spring and wetland area that supports the relic White River springfish.
Lunar Crater		1973	38.383968°N 116.069167°W	Nye	federal (Bureau of Land Management)	400-acre (160 ha) maar thought to have been formed by a past volcanic explosion.
Ruby Lake National Wildlife Refuge		1972	40.202°N 115.493°W	Elko	federal	One of the largest and finest natural wetlands in Nevada.
Timber Mountain Caldera		1973		Nye	federal (Nellis Air Force Range)	Remnant of an elliptical caldera developed in the late Miocene and early Pliocene.
Valley of Fire		1968	36.456111°N 114.533056°W	Clark	state park	An outstanding example of thrust faulting.

== See also ==
- List of National Historic Landmarks in Nevada
