= Wattles Mansion =

Historic house and park in Hollywood, Los Angeles

- Jualita
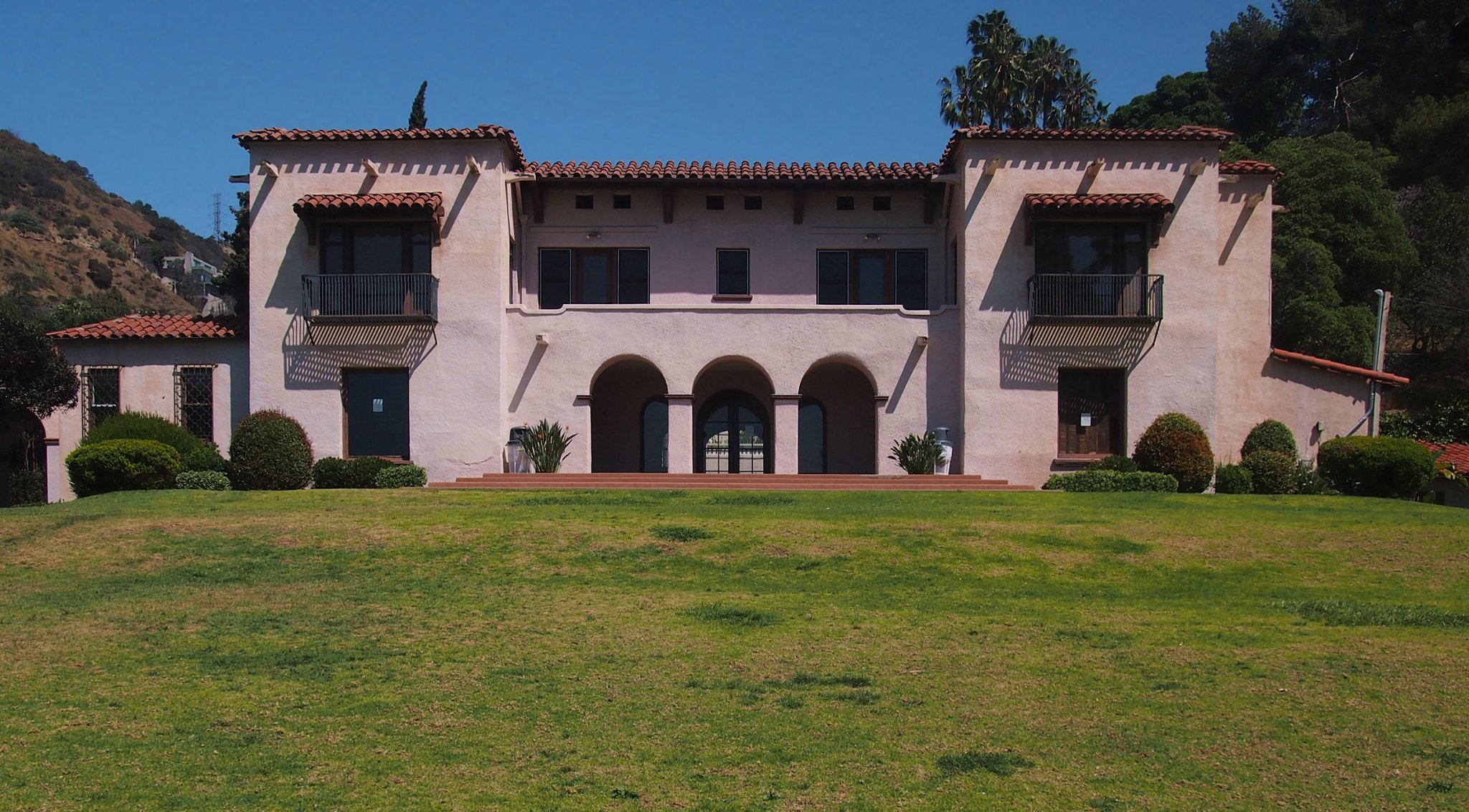
- The Wattles Mansion from the south
- Interactive map of the Wattles Mansion area

General information
- Architectural style: Mission Revival Style
- Location: 1824 N Curson Avenue, Los Angeles, United States
- Coordinates: 34°6′15.5″N 118°21′16.8″W
- Completed: 1907
- Client: Gurdon Wattles
- Owner: Los Angeles Department of Recreation and Parks

Design and construction
- Architects: Elmer Grey, Myron Hunt

Los Angeles Historic-Cultural Monument
- Designated: May 25, 1993
- Reference no.: 579

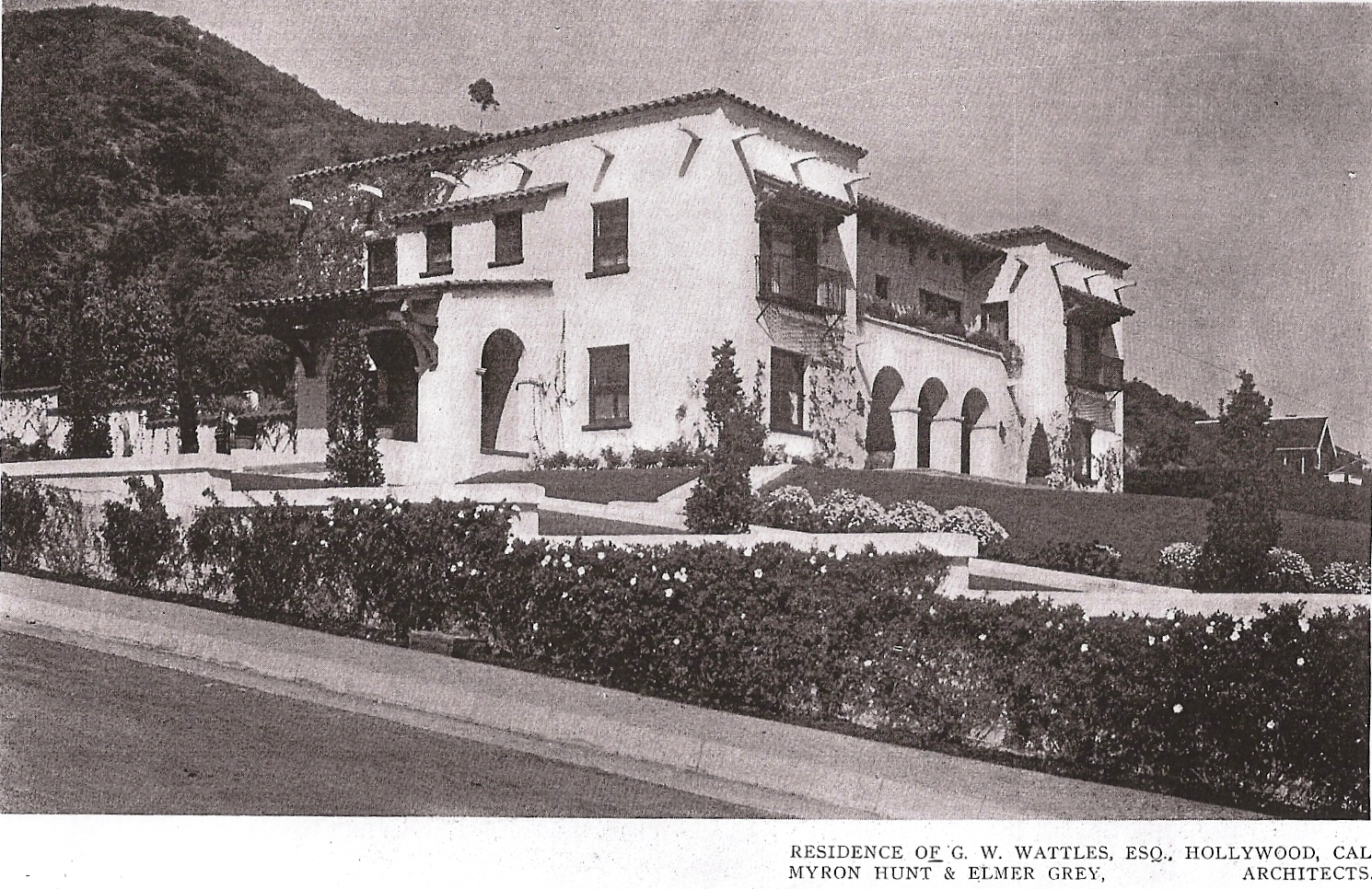
Wattles Mansion in 1913

The Wattles Mansion, formally known as Jualita, is a former estate in the Hollywood area of Los Angeles, California. The mansion is a Mission Revival style mansion built in the estate in 1907 for wealthy Omaha banker Gurdon Wattles as his winter home; the estate contains a complex of gardens. It was sold to the city in 1968 and became the Wattles Garden Park, operated by the Department of Recreation and Parks. The mansion and gardens were designated a Los Angeles Historic-Cultural Monument in 1993.

The estate has been recognized as "the only remaining intact example of the once plentiful Hollywood estates from the period preceding the film industry, when Hollywood was primarily agricultural and was a wintering home for wealthy Easterners and Midwesterners." According to the City of Los Angeles, "'Jualita' is one of the few remaining landscapes reminiscent of another era and tradition, possessing a genuine integrity of setting, design, workmanship, and association."

== Site ==
The estate is located between Nichols Canyon and Runyon Canyon of Hollywood Hills West at the foothills of the Santa Monica Mountains in Los Angeles. The current park contains about 47.5 acres of the estate, which in its original 90 acre extent was divided into two basic northern and southern portions.

The southern portion, which includes the residence and most of the gardens, originally contained about 10 acres and is bounded in the south by Hollywood Boulevard, in the east by North Sierra Bonita Avenue, and in the west by North Curson Avenue, reaching up to the northernmost entrance of the park on Curson. This portion includes the Wattles Mansion on 1824 North Curson Avenue. On the southern and main façade of the mansion is the front lawn; past this is Wattles Farms, now a community garden, and the original citrus and avocado groves. Attached to the north of the mansion is a walled-in garden area including the formal Spanish garden and Italian rose garden. Past the walled gardens is a portion of the American garden, originally a series of connecting gardens which continued north into the canyon and into the northern portion of the estate.

The original northern portion of the estate covered about eighty acres of mountainous areas, the remaining eastern half of the estate is now part of the park and contains another large lawn, originally the American garden. Further into the canyon are the remains of the Japanese garden, surrounded by the rest of the park which is mostly undeveloped mountainous coastal sage scrub and chaparral with hiking trails. The northern portion of the park shares a border on the west with the MRCA Trebek Open Space and on the north and east with Runyon Canyon Park and the Santa Monica Mountains National Recreation Area, the hiking trails from the park provide access to these surrounding spaces.

The west half of the northern portion and a small northwestern part of the southern portion of the estate were subdivided into residential lots also surrounded by canyon ridges. The residential areas around the estate were mostly developed around the 1920s, especially those across Curson Avenue. Wattles had 1859 Curson Avenue built for his head gardener Alexander Urquhart in 1924. Notably, the house on 1753 Curson was designed by Morgan, Walls and Morgan, in 1923.

== History ==
Noted local architects Myron Hunt and Elmer Grey designed the Mission Revival residence in 1907 with grounds featuring a Japanese garden, an Italian rose garden, a formal Spanish garden, a palm court, and orchards. It was one of Hollywood's first tourist attractions. Wattles was responsible for gradually transforming 49 acres (200,000 m^{2}) of agricultural land into orchards, thematic gardens and naturalistic landscapes based on his trips to Japan and Mexico.

Prior to permanent residence in Los Angeles, Wattles headed the streetcar company in Omaha. His strike-breaking efforts contributed to four days of violence in the city in 1909. The attempt to unionize failed and many of the strikers had to seek work elsewhere, but the incident damaged Wattles' social standing and worsened relations between the city's rich and the general citizenry. A jury's refusal in 1906 to convict career criminal Pat Crowe for the kidnapping of Omaha packing house scion Edward Cudahy was widely seen as an expression of contempt for the city's ruling elite. Several millionaires fled the city, including the Cudahy family. With his civic reputation damaged, Wattles himself began to spend more time in Los Angeles after the strike and permanently relocated in 1920.

After Wattles' death in 1932, his wife, Julia Vance Wattles, and his son continued to live on the property. Gurdon Wallace Wattles Jr. negotiated the sale of the residence to the City of Los Angeles in 1965. In March of that year, the City of Los Angeles Board of Recreation and Parks Commission adopted Resolution 5135, designating the Wattles estate as an acquisition area, and purchased the property for $1,917,000 in June 1968.

Hollywood Heritage, a private nonprofit preservation organization, began restoration efforts in 1983, and the estate served as their headquarters until May 22, 2009, when control of the property reverted to the Los Angeles Department of Recreation and Parks. Over the first decade, volunteers with the Hollywood Heritage organization removed several feet of mud from the garden, replanted landscaping, and repainted and refinished the interior woodwork. Through their dedicated efforts, the Wattles Mansion was returned to its original state.

In 1993, the Wattles Mansion was designated as City of Los Angeles Cultural Monument No. 579. In 2000, the J. Paul Getty Trust donated $75,000 toward a Preserve L.A. planning project designed to further the site's preservation.

== Wattles Mansion ==
The home is two stories with a full basement. The first-floor rooms include a paneled library, a formal dining room, a large living room with a picture window to the south gardens, two large bathrooms off the entrance hall, a servant's dining hall, and a kitchen and pantry. Five bedrooms and three baths are on the second floor.

Some of the original features in the Wattles Mansion include a black-and-white-checkerboard marble floor in the foyer, and intricately carved walnut bookcases and a hand-painted ceiling in the library. Hardwood moldings, white stucco walls, wood-beamed ceilings, and hardwood floors with Oriental carpets are found throughout the house. There is a terracotta tile terrace and a wide, sloping lawn. Brick landings on a wide stairway go down toward landscaped terraces on each side, with a Spanish balustraded patio overlooking 3 acres (12,000 m^{2}) of formal gardens.

== Wattles Farm ==
Once the avocado and fruit orchard of the Wattles Mansion, in 1975 a group of local residents converted a 4.2-acre (17,000 m^{2}) section of the then-neglected Wattles estate into a community garden. Today, this members-only organic garden is among the oldest community gardens in Los Angeles. It is run by a nonprofit organization called the Wattles Farm and Neighborhood Gardeners Inc. in partnership with the Los Angeles Department of Recreation and Parks.

== Wattles Park ==
Some of the gardens surrounding Wattles Mansion have been designated as Wattles Park. Gurdon Wattles met the original head gardener during his world travels in 1910, and retained him for the next 20 years until his death in 1930. Gurdon's concept for the gardens was influenced by trips to Mexico and Japan; he bought a tea house, shrines and lanterns from Japan for use in the gardens. Four gardens were eventually developed, with the first corresponding to the architecture of the house, the second Italian, the third American, and the fourth Japanese.

Today, Wattles Park occupies approximately 50 acres (200,000 m^{2}) of a long narrow corridor of space that rises 950 feet (290 m) from Hollywood Boulevard. The lower park is 4.13 acres (16,700 m^{2}) in size and fronts on Hollywood Boulevard. The Wattles Mansion and formal garden area runs along the private roadway to the building. The early American garden area is directly behind the residence and was composed of rose and vegetable gardens. The Japanese teahouse along Curson Avenue was a gift to the City of Los Angeles from Nagoya, its sister city in Japan. The Japanese garden portion of the grounds was designed by Fugo, an influential landscape architect in Japan. All of the shrubs, plants, and vegetation were brought directly from Japan for the garden.

In the 1970s and 1980s, the park was popular among L.A.'s punk scene. In the 1980s and 1990s, crime at the park increased, with individuals using the tea house for drug sales and use. Vandalism and a couple of fires ruined the tea house, which has since been off limits to all visitors, and only a small portion of the tea house is still standing. Heavy flooding overflowed the small lake and stream, drying them up forever. Some of the palm trees had to be cut down. The place became unkempt as a result of the cutbacks, making it difficult to maintain the gardens. Graffiti was reported on the white columns and the Japanese entrance, as well as the outdoor temple, and the roof of the temple was removed. The park now has a sign warning of rattlesnakes in the area. Benches were removed as well.

Wattles Park has become popular with dog walkers.

== Eviction notice ==
Hollywood Heritage was served an eviction notice in 2008 by the City of Los Angeles for failure to maintain the landmark and for throwing loud parties. Hollywood Heritage denied the allegations but ultimately agreed to vacate the mansion in May 2009.

== Cultural references ==
Author Lucky McKee used the park as a backdrop in the novel May. The mansion was featured on the television series The O.C. and Buffy the Vampire Slayer ("Reptile Boy"), in the movie Troop Beverly Hills, and the sanatorium scenes in the film Rain Man were shot there as well. It was also featured in Jennifer Lopez's first film, My Family. Wattles was also used extensively for the 1985 film Ghoulies and for the Diana Ross music video "Eaten Alive". The park was used for many scenes in the 1984 film The Lost Empire directed by Jim Wynorski. Portions of the Nirvana music video for "Come as You Are," directed by Kevin Kerslake, were filmed at the park in 1992.

== See also ==
- History of Hollywood, California
- Los Angeles Historic-Cultural Monuments in Hollywood
- 1914 land survey map showing the southern portion of the estate
- 1924 land survey map including the northern portion of the estate
