= First Church of Christ, Scientist (Long Beach, California) =

Christian Scientist Church in Long Beach, California, United States

Coordinates: 33.772413°N 118.187372°W

- Interactive map of the First Church of Christ, Scientist area

General information
- Architectural style: Classical Revival architecture
- Location: 440 Elm Avenue; Long Beach, California, United States
- Completed: 1913

Design and construction
- Architect: Elmer Grey

Website
- https://www.440elm.com/

Long Beach Historic Landmark

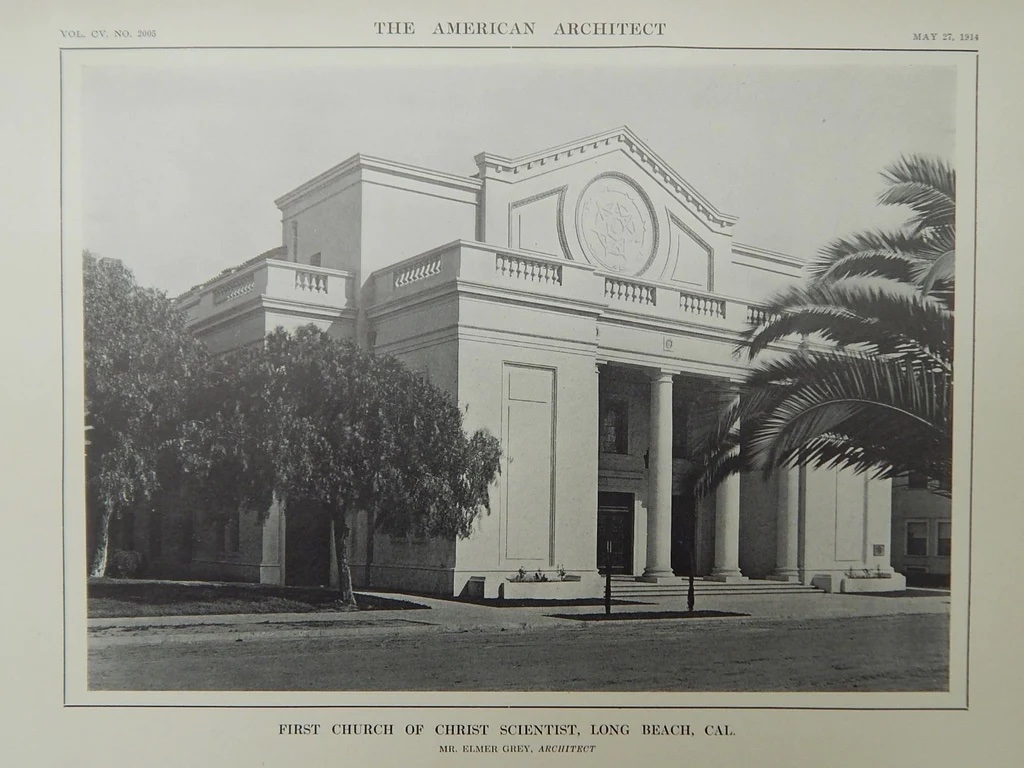
First Church of Christ Scientist Long Beach

The former First Church of Christ, Scientist is a historic Christian Science church building located at 440 Elm Avenue, Long Beach, California, United States. Built in 1913, it was designed in the Classical Revival-style of architecture by noted Los Angeles architect Elmer Grey.

The Long Beach city ordinance designating First Church of Christ, Scientist former building at 440 Elm Avenue as Historic Landmark No. 16.52.580 stated that: "First Church of Christ Scientist was Long Beach's first Christian Science Church. As such, it established an important religious institution in this city. Additionally, this church was one of the few downtown churches to survive the 1933 earthquake relatively undamaged and, therefore, is one of the oldest churches in Long Beach."

The building was sold in 1989 to the First Christian Church. First Church of Christ, Scientist, now holds services at 3629 Atlantic Avenue, in Long Beach.

As of 2022, it was approved for use as a banquet hall/ event facility and is available for weddings and private event rentals

== See also ==
- List of City of Long Beach historic landmarks
- List of former Christian Science churches, societies and buildings
- Second Church of Christ, Scientist (Long Beach, California)
