= First Church of Christ, Scientist (Los Angeles) =

Historic church in California, United States

Coordinates: 34.045315°N 118.283589°W

- First Church of Christ, Scientist; Los Angeles, California
- U.S. Historic district – Contributing property
- Los Angeles Historic-Cultural Monument
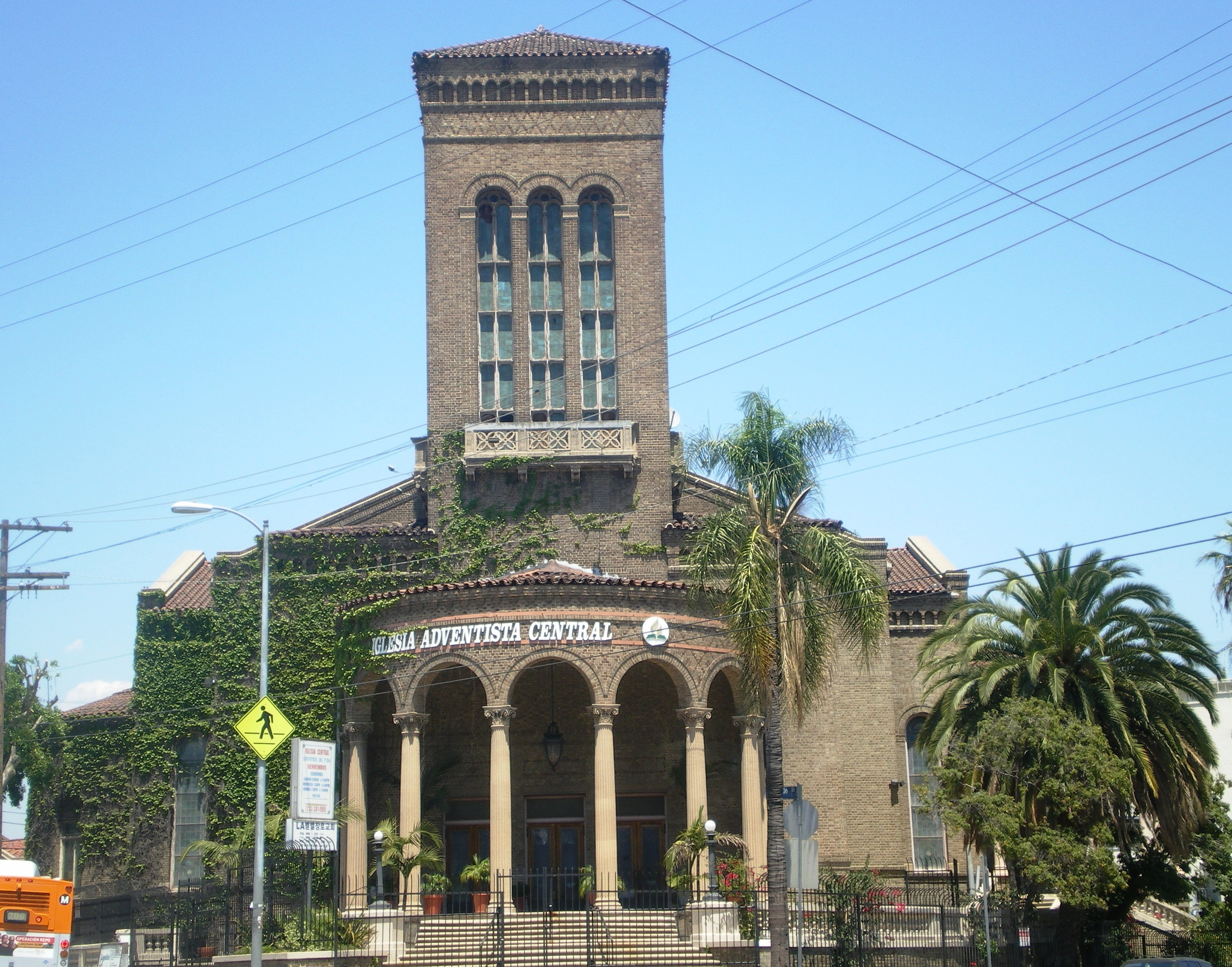
- The former First Church of Christ, Scientist (Los Angeles, California)
- Location: 1366 South Alvarado Street; Los Angeles, California
- Built: 1912
- Architect: Elmer Grey
- Architectural style: Beaux Arts, Italianate, Spanish Romanesque Revival
- Part of: Alvarado Terrace Historic District (ID84000783)
- LAHCM No.: 89

Significant dates
- Added to NRHP: May 17, 1984
- Designated LAHCM: July 7, 1971

The former First Church of Christ, Scientist, built in 1912, is a historic Christian Science church edifice located at 1366 South Alvarado Street in Pico-Union, Los Angeles, California.

The former church is a Historic district contributing property in the Alvarado Terrace Historic District, which was added on May 17, 1984, to the National Register of Historic Places. It is also a Los Angeles Historic-Cultural Monument.

== History ==
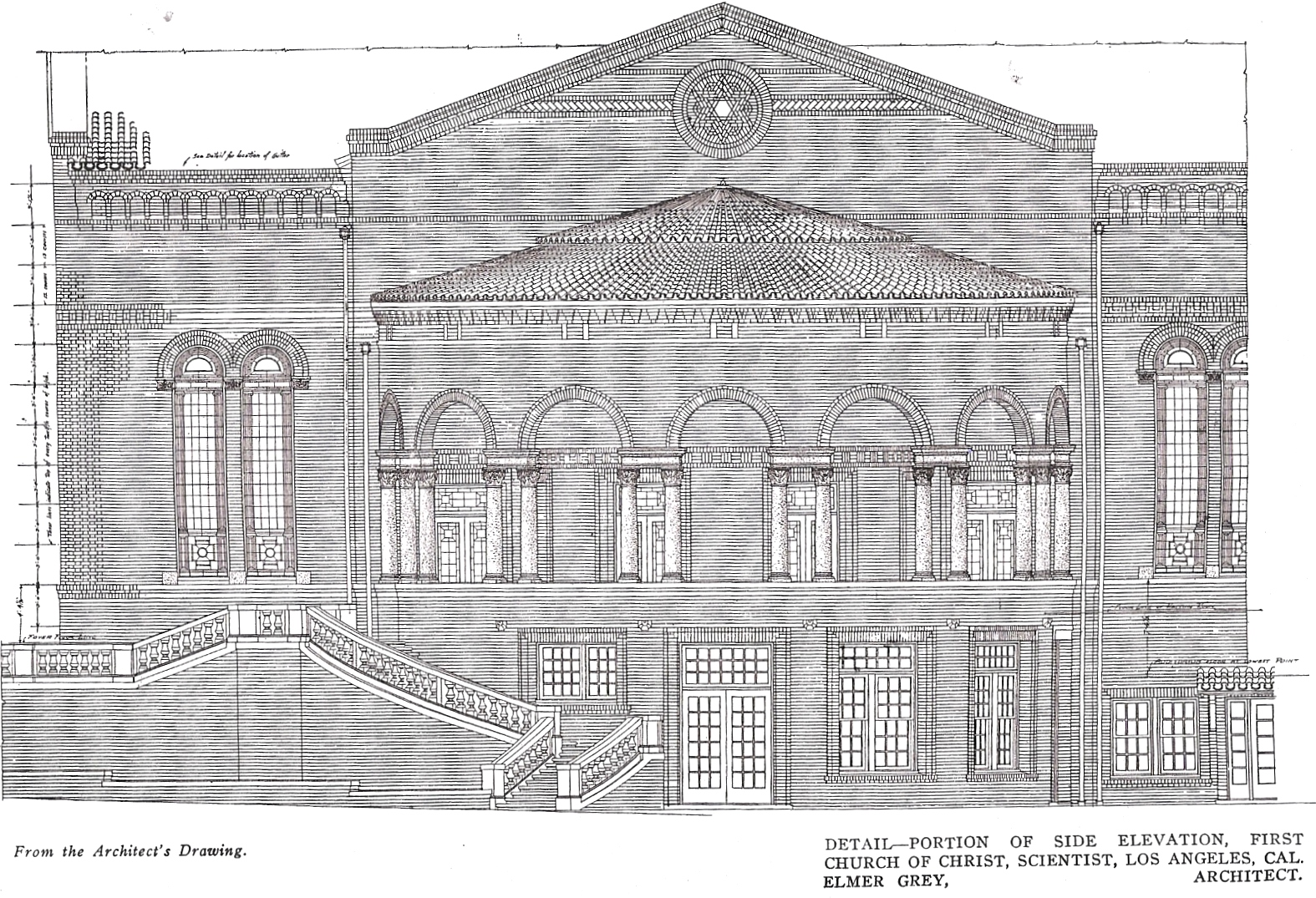
Architectural drawing of the side view at First Church of Christ, Scientist

The First Church of Christ, Scientist was designed by noted Los Angeles architect, Elmer Grey in a mixture of Beaux Arts—Italianate—Spanish Romanesque Revival styles.

The church building was sold in 1972 and was used as a synagogue for a time. It then become the Los Angeles branch of the ill-fated Disciples of Christ church, known as the Peoples Temple, led by the Reverend Jim Jones. First Church of Christ, Scientist, is no longer listed in the Christian Science Journal.

As of 2007 the building is a Spanish-speaking Seventh-day Adventist church called Iglesia Adventista Central.

== See also ==
- Second Church of Christ, Scientist
- List of Los Angeles Historic-Cultural Monuments in South Los Angeles
- List of former Christian Science churches, societies and buildings
- National Register of Historic Places listings in Los Angeles
- First Church of Christ, Scientist (disambiguation)
