= Harvard Heights, Los Angeles =

Harvard Heights
- Neighborhood of Los Angeles
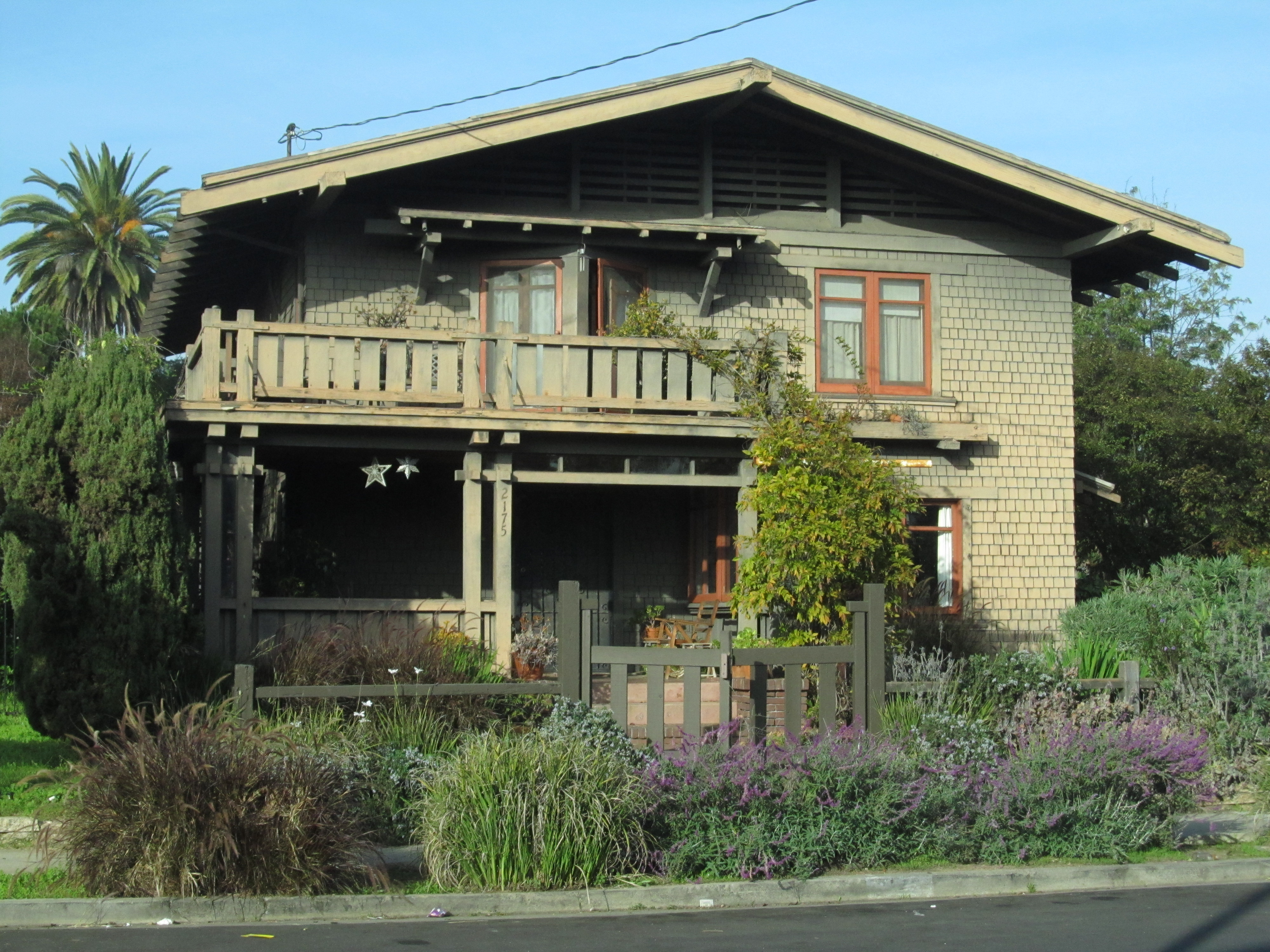
- The Lucy E. Wheeler/Martin Weil House, 2025

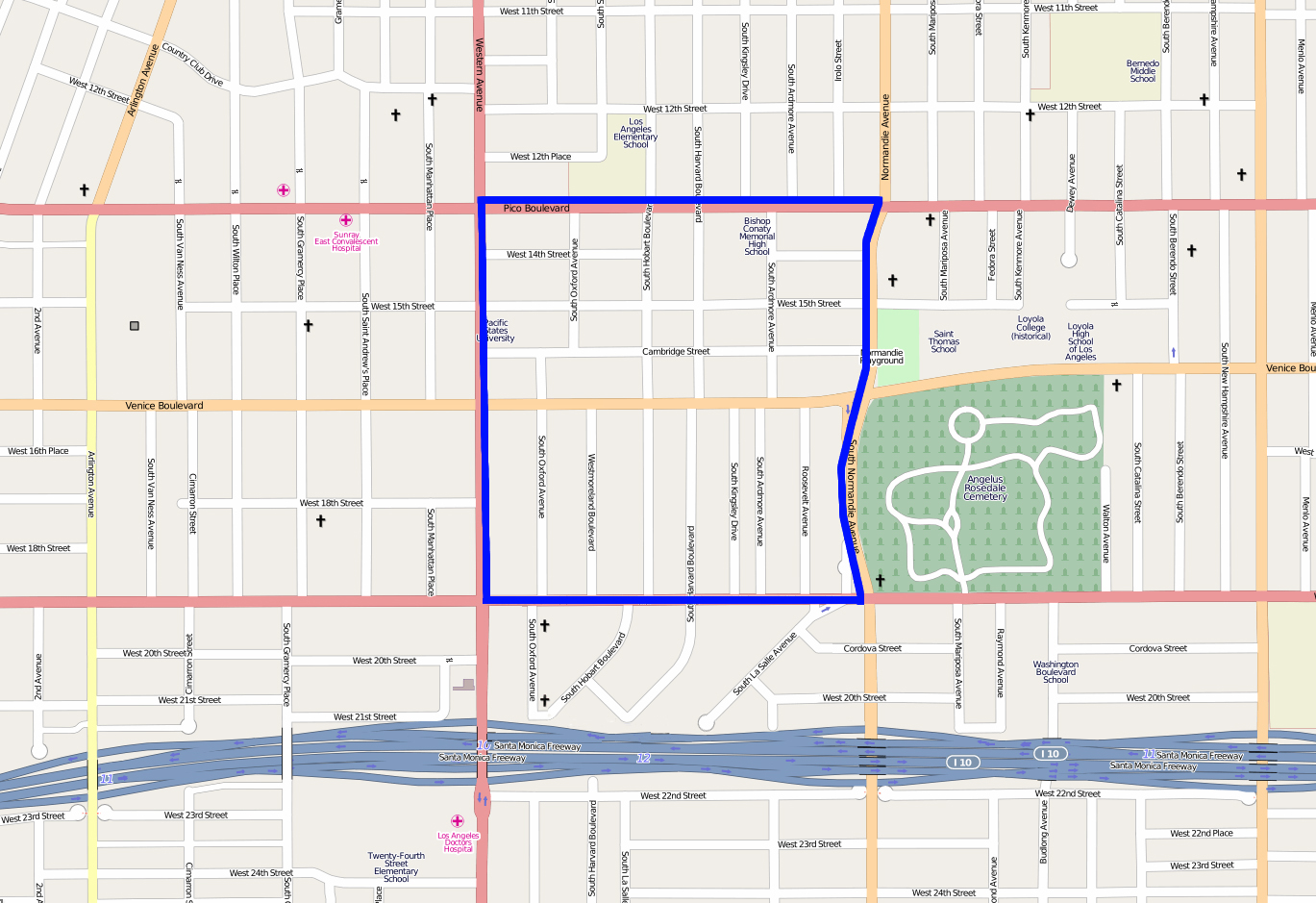
- Harvard Heights, as delineated by the Los Angeles Times

- Location within central Los Angeles
- Coordinates: 34°2′36″N 118°18′15″W
- Country: United States
- State: California
- County: Los Angeles
- City: Los Angeles

Harvard Heights is a neighborhood in West Adams district of Los Angeles. It lies within a city designated historic preservation overlay zone designed to protect its architecturally significant single-family residences, including the Lucy E. Wheeler/Martin E. Weil House, the only remaining Greene and Greene house in Los Angeles.

There are five Los Angeles Historic-Cultural Monuments in the neighborhood, including a private library dedicated to the memory of singer Ray Charles.

== History ==
Harvard Heights has been noted as a

once grand neighborhood that was in danger of falling apart. ... The overall population was old and largely African American as whites migrated to the suburbs, the freeway bisected the neighborhood, and most of the homes had been converted into apartments. ... [but the] neighborhood's long-anticipated renaissance took place in the late '90s. As Los Angeles commutes got longer and longer, white-collar professionals began moving back into the city.

Harvard Heights has been called a "preservationist's dream come true," a neighborhood characterized by the Craftsman houses built on the heights southwest of downtown, primarily between 1902 and 1910. Today, Harvard Heights boasts the only remaining Greene and Greene home in Los Angeles, "as well as homes built by the Heinemann brothers, Hunt and Eager, and especially architect Frank M. Tyler."

According to a 2005 Los Angeles Times headline, Harvard Heights was "a stately turn-of-the-century neighborhood that has been undergoing a restoration boom after decades of hard times. [The] [e]xquisite woodwork, high ceilings, formal dining rooms, cozy inglenooks and stained-glass windows are some of the features that attract residents to [the] spacious two-story homes" found in the area."

In 2005, it was said that "Although prices are rising steadily, Harvard Heights remains an affordable choice for people interested in large historic homes. Two-story homes here are a relative bargain when the square footage and features are compared with similarly priced structures in other neighborhoods."

Exquisite woodwork, high ceilings, formal dining rooms, cozy inglenooks and stained-glass windows are some of the features that attract residents to these spacious two-story homes. For those who work downtown, the area's proximity to the city and the Santa Monica Freeway make it an easy commute.

The architecture of the neighborhood has also made the area a favorite for film and television location scouts.

== Geography ==
According to the Los Angeles Times, Harvard Heights is located in the West Adams district and is bounded by Pico Boulevard on the north, Washington Boulevard on the south, Normandie Avenue on the east and Western Avenue on the west. It is bordered by Angelus Vista on the west, West Adams Heights on the south and the Byzantine-Latino Quarter is on the north.

== Historic Preservation Overlay Zone ==
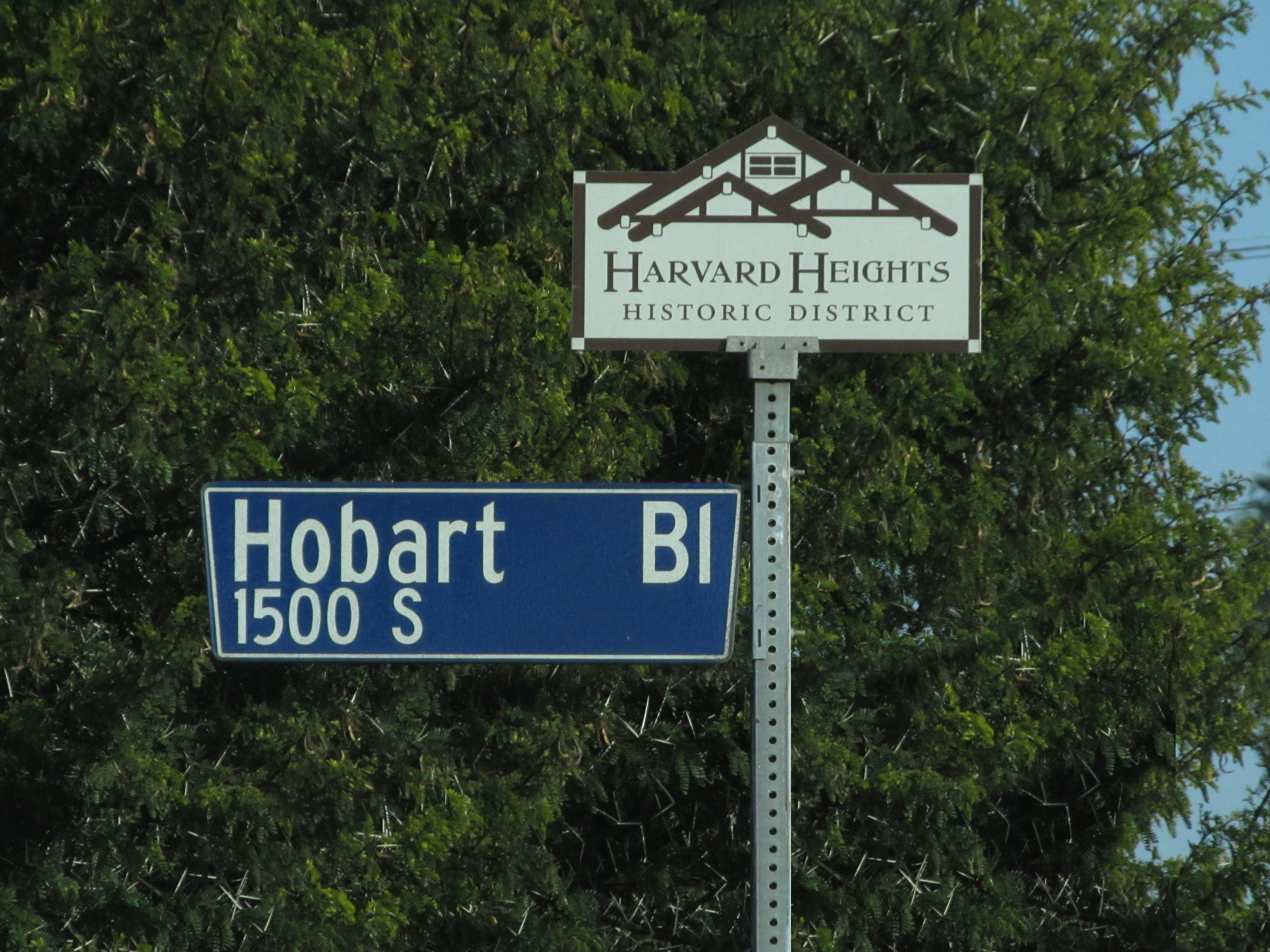
Harvard Heights Historic Preservation Zone Signage

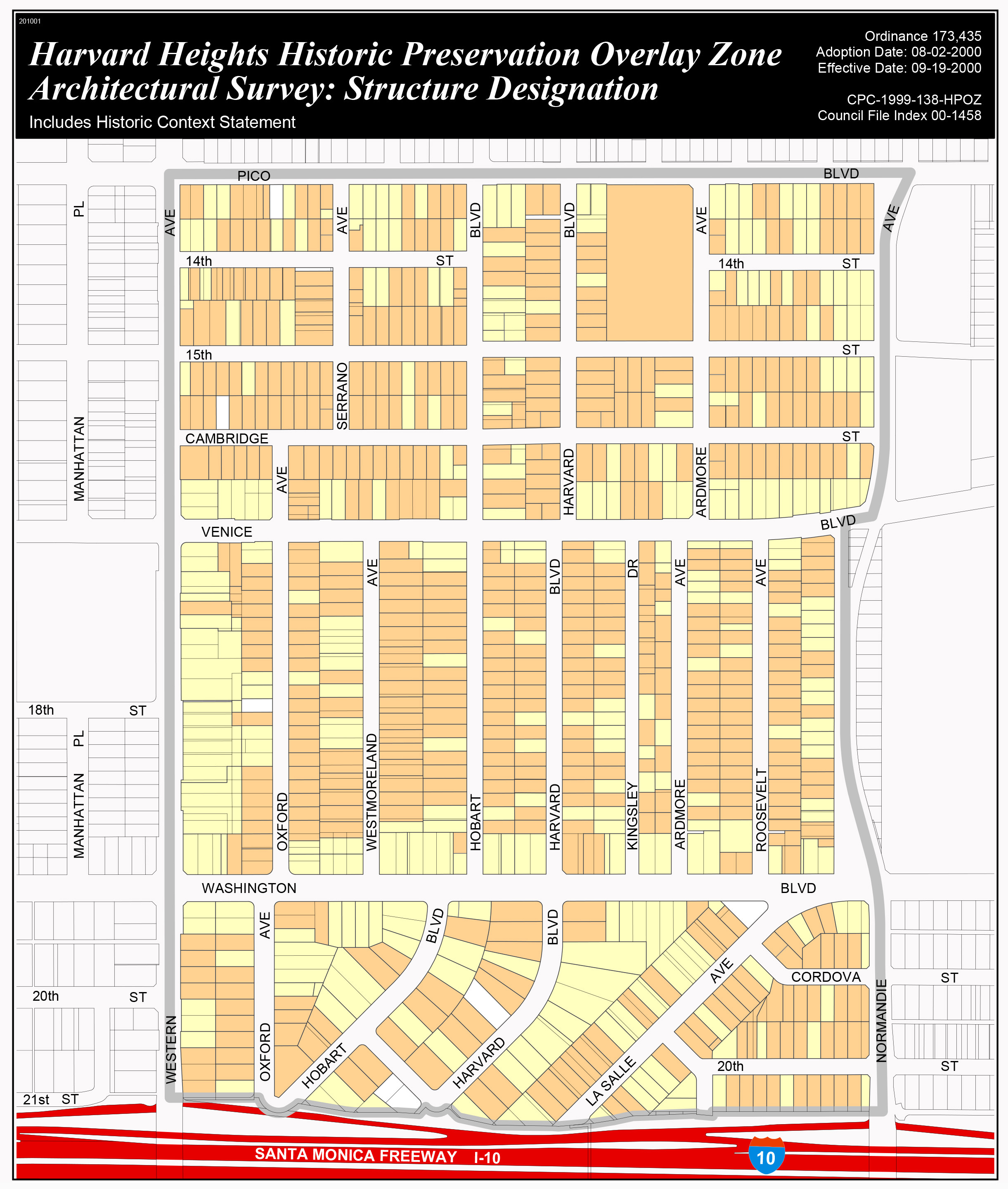
Harvard Heights Historic Preservation Zone Map

The Harvard Heights Historic Preservation Zone was adopted in 2000. It encompasses 34 blocks composed predominantly of single-family residences, some multiple-family residences, as well as commercial properties. The designated historic zone lies between Pico Boulevard on the north, Santa Monica Freeway to the south, Normandie Avenue on the east and Western Avenue on the west. The HPOZ includes both the neighborhood of Harvard Heights to the north of Washington Boulevard and the neighborhood of West Adams Heights to the south.

== Historic-Cultural Monuments ==
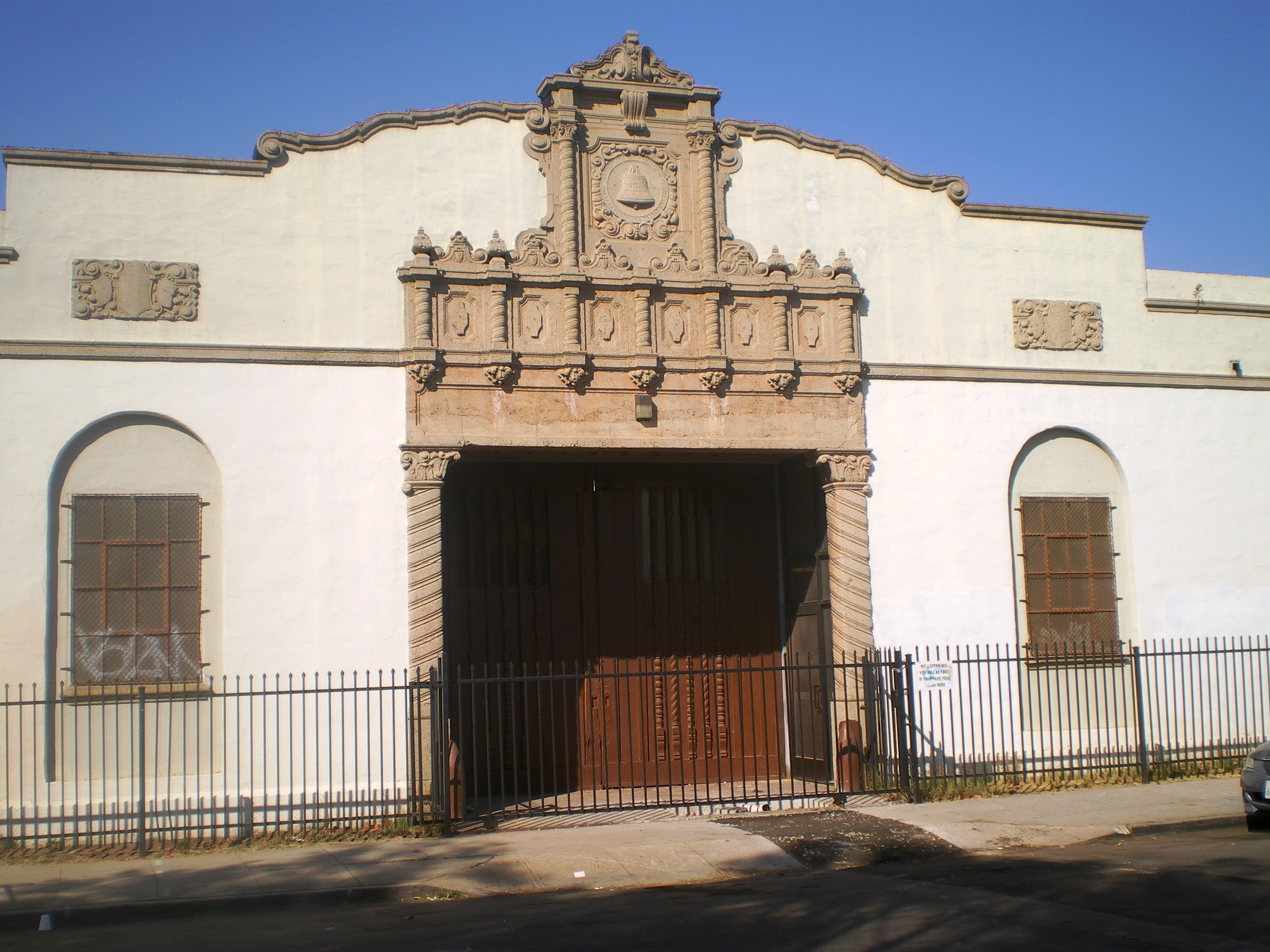
Pacific Bell Building, 2008

There are five Los Angeles Historic-Cultural Monuments in Harvard Heights:

- Peet House - 1139 S. Harvard Boulevard. On September 21, 1983 it became Historic Cultural Monument #272
- Angelus-Rosedale Cemetery - 1831 W. Washington Boulevard. On December 1, 1987, it became Historic Cultural Monument #330.
- Pacific Bell Building - 2755 W. 15th Street. On December 8, 1987, it became Historic Cultural Monument #331. In February 2013, the Spanish Colonial-revival building was rehabilitated for adaptive reuse and reopened as the Jane B. Eisner charter middle school.
- Ray Charles's recording studio and office - 2107 W. Washington Boulevard. On January 21, 2004 it became Historic Cultural Monument #776. In September 2010, the original site of the singer recording studio was rededicated as the Ray Charles Memorial Library. The library contains exhibit space including memorabilia, awards, and interactive music displays.
- Julius Bierlich Residence - 1818 S. Gramercy Place. On September 27, 1994, it became Historic Cultural Monument #599.
- Lucy E. Wheeler/Martin E. Weil House - 2175 Cambridge Street. It is Historic Cultural Monument #991. Designed by Greene and Greene, it is the last remaining example of the firm’s work in Los Angeles.

== Education ==
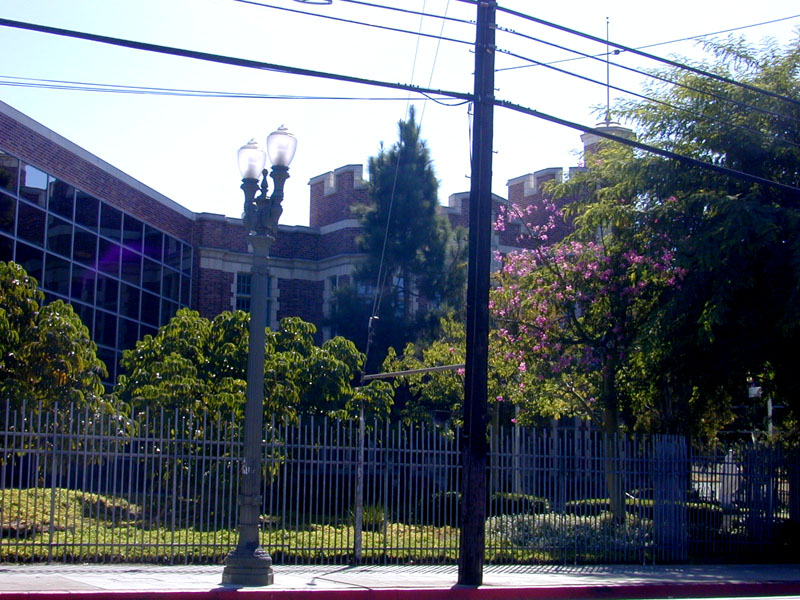
Bishop Conaty Our Lady of Loretto High School

Schools operating within the Harvard Heights borders are:

- Los Angeles Elementary School, LAUSD, 1211 South Hobart Boulevard
- Bishop Conaty-Our Lady of Loretto High School, private, 2900 West Pico Boulevard
- The Jane B. Eisner School (New Camino Nuevo Charter), charter, 2755 W. 15th St. A middle school campus serving grades 6 through 8.

== Business and commerce ==
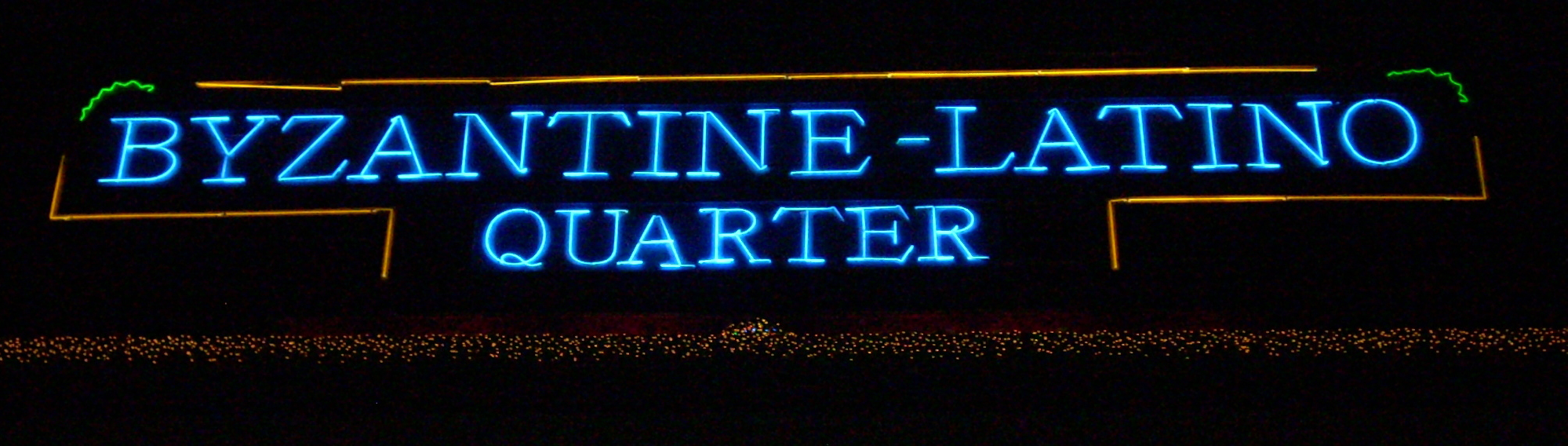
Byzantine-Latino Quarter sign at night, at Pico Boulelvard. and Normandie Avenue

The Byzantine-Latino Quarter is located at the northern edge of the neighborhood.

== Demographics ==
According to the Mapping L.A. project of the Los Angeles Times, the 2000 U.S. census counted 18,587 residents in the 0.79-square-mile neighborhood—an average of 23,473 people per square mile, one of the highest densities in Los Angeles. In 2008 the city estimated that the population had increased to 20,194. The median age for residents was 30, about the same as the city norm.

Harvard Heights was considered moderately diverse ethnically. In 2000, The breakdown was Latinos, 66.3%; Asians, 13.3%; blacks, 16%, whites, 3.3%; and others, 1.2%. Mexico (32.9%) and El Salvador (24.8%) were the most common places of birth for the 57.8% of the residents who were born abroad, a figure that was considered high compared to the city as a whole.

The median household income in 2008 dollars was $31,173, a low figure for Los Angeles, and a high percentage of households earned $20,000 or less. The average household size of 3.2 people was high for the city of Los Angeles. Renters occupied 84.3% of the housing units, and house- or apartment owners the rest.

The percentages of never-married men and women, 50% and 48,2%, respectively, were among the county's highest. The 2000 census found 939 families headed by single parents, a high rate for both the city and the county. There were 501 military veterans in 2000, or 3.8%, a low figure for Los Angeles. Just 10.3% of Harvard Heights residents aged 25 and older had a four-year degree in 2000, a low rate for both the city and the county. The percentage of residents with less than a high school diploma was high for the county.

== Notable residents ==
- William M. Hughes, Los Angeles City Council member, 1927–29
- Edward Trinkkeller, master ironworker and designer of the gates at Hearst Castle
- Frank M. Tyler, architect
- Lovie Yancey, founder of the Fatburger hamburger chain
- Ivy Pochoda, author

== See also ==
- List of districts and neighborhoods in Los Angeles
