= Frank M. Tyler =

American architect (1876–1961)

Frank Milton Tyler
- Born: July 25, 1876; Kansas
- Died: February 22, 1961 (aged 84); San Luis Obispo, California
- Occupation: Architect
- Partner: Lillian B Burkhard
- Children: 2
- Buildings: S.H. Watson House, Victoria Park, Los Angeles (1908)

Frank Milton Tyler (July 25, 1876 - February 22, 1961) was an American architect known for his work on craftsman-style homes in Los Angeles, California.

== Early life ==
Tyler was born on July 25, 1876, in Kansas. Frank's father, Marcus Stickney Tyler, was a Civil War veteran from Lockport, New York, who moved to Manhattan, Kansas, with his wife, Lydia F. Wisner, in 1870. The couple married in 1869 and would rear six children, including Frank. Marcus worked as a lumber merchant in Manhattan and was financially stable. Tyler's father continued to work in Kansas as a merchant during Frank's formative years. The year after Frank's birth in 1877, Marcus Tyler was a dealer in "lumber, hardware and agricultural implements" in Wamego, Kansas, a small town located in the state's center on a bend of the Kansas River; he and his family lived on Vine Street in the same town.

Frank Tyler and his family moved to Los Angeles, California, between 1878 and 1888. In 1900, he lived with his parents and two brothers in Los Angeles. Tyler married Lillian Burkhart in 1904 and eventually lived in Los Angeles with her and his in-laws, John and Becky Stump Burkhart.

== Career ==
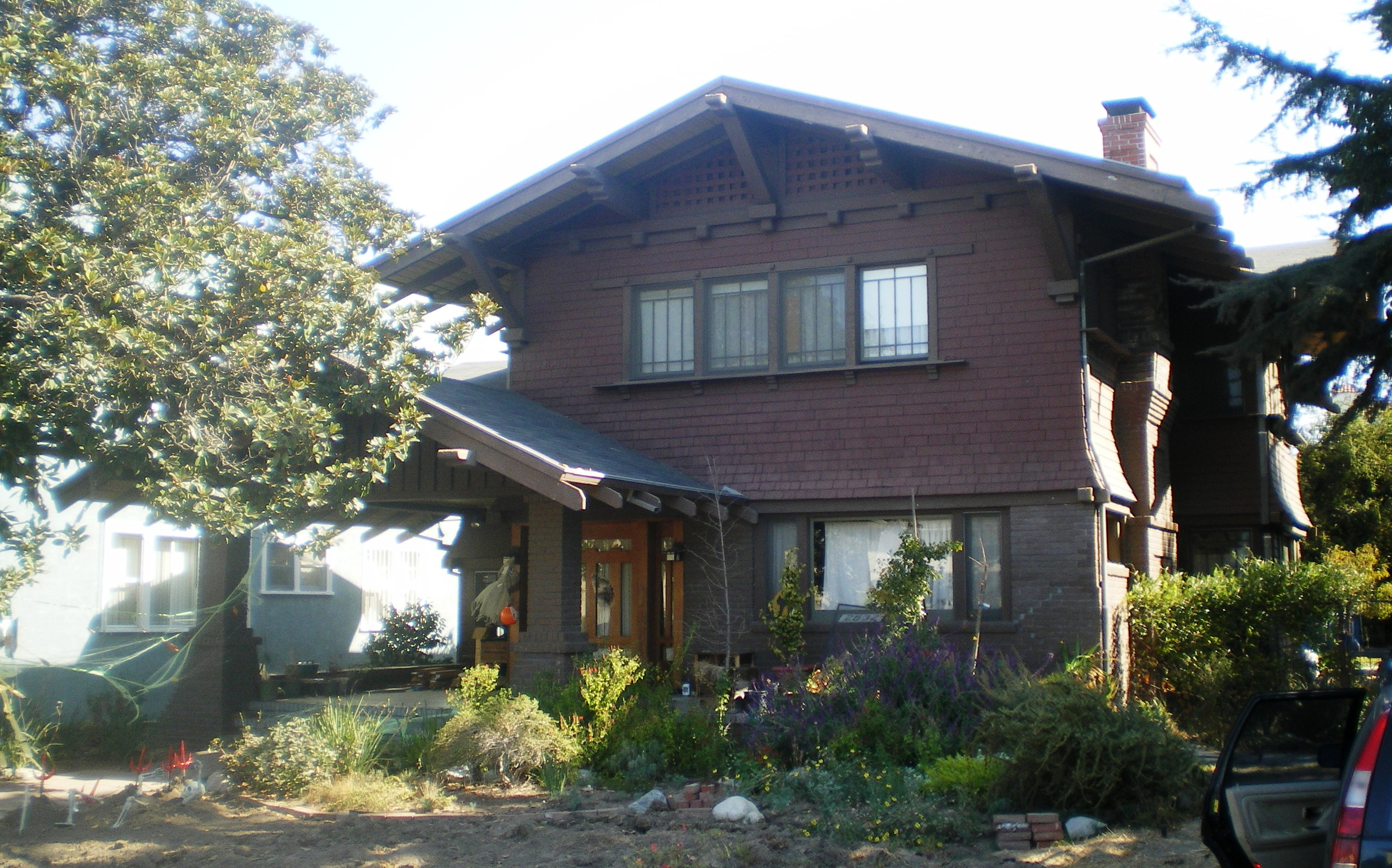
Gordon L. McDonough House, 2532 5th Avenue, West Adams, Los Angeles.

The 1900 US Census indicated that Frank Tyler was already working as an architect at age 23 in Los Angeles.

Architect Frank M. Tyler designed numerous distinctive Craftsman-style homes in West Adams, Los Angeles. Frank M. Tyler erected his own distinctive residence on Oxford, in a West Adams neighborhood now known as Harvard Heights (now demolished), and the family was very active in residential design and construction throughout the West Adams District. Tyler's homes share some distinctive elements, including an emphasis on vertical lines, large attics, and gables on what are often 2½ story houses, and commonly include English Tudor elements.

Tyler designed the S.H. Watson House in Victoria Park, Los Angeles, in 1908. The same year, he also designed a seven-room bungalow for F.Z. Phillips, a two-story, eight-room wood-frame house for E.L. Petitfils, and the H.C. Jensen Store and Apartments, all located in Los Angeles. In 1910–1911, he designed a house for Francis E. Bacon in Berkeley Square in West Adams, Los Angeles. In 1911–1912, he designed a house for Nathan W. Tarr in Sierra Madre, California. In the same two years, he designed the German Presbyterian Church at 1009 E 41st Place in Los Angeles, now demolished. He also designed the Minney House/Salisbury House at 2273 West 20th Street in West Adams, Los Angeles. He also designed a house in Eagle Rock, Los Angeles. In 1927, he designed an Art Deco commercial building at 5464 Wilshire Boulevard in Los Angeles.

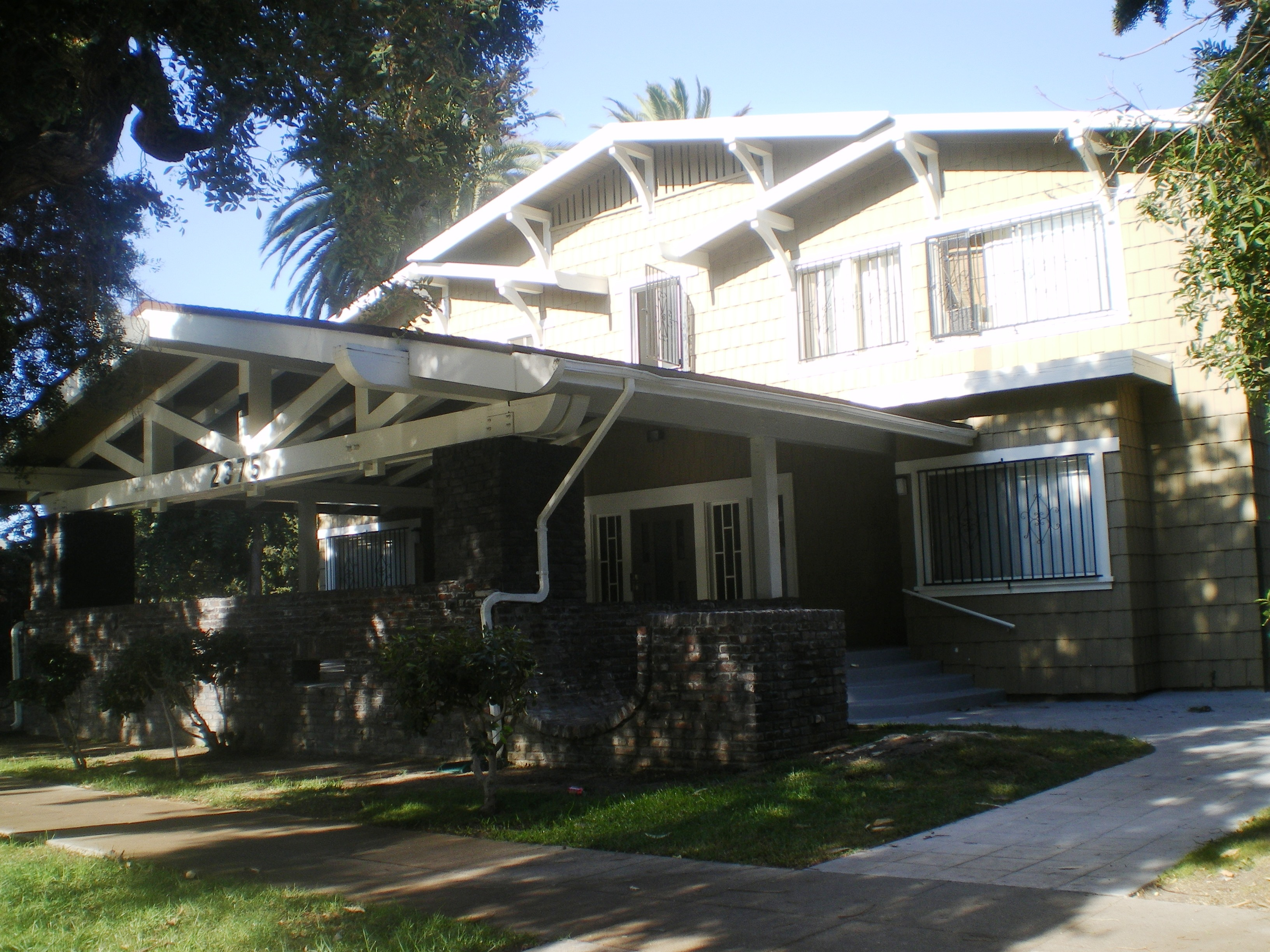
Chalet Apartments, 2375 Scarff Street, West Adams, Los Angeles.

He also designed homes in Harvard Heights, Los Angeles, and Pico-Union, Los Angeles. Some of them are on the List of Los Angeles Historic-Cultural Monuments in South Los Angeles, such as the Gordon L. McDonough House at 2532 5th Avenue, the Chalet Apartments at 2375 Scarff Street, and the Julius Bierlich Residence at 1818 S. Gramercy Place. Additionally, some of his houses in the South Serrano Avenue Historic District are listed on the National Register of Historic Places.

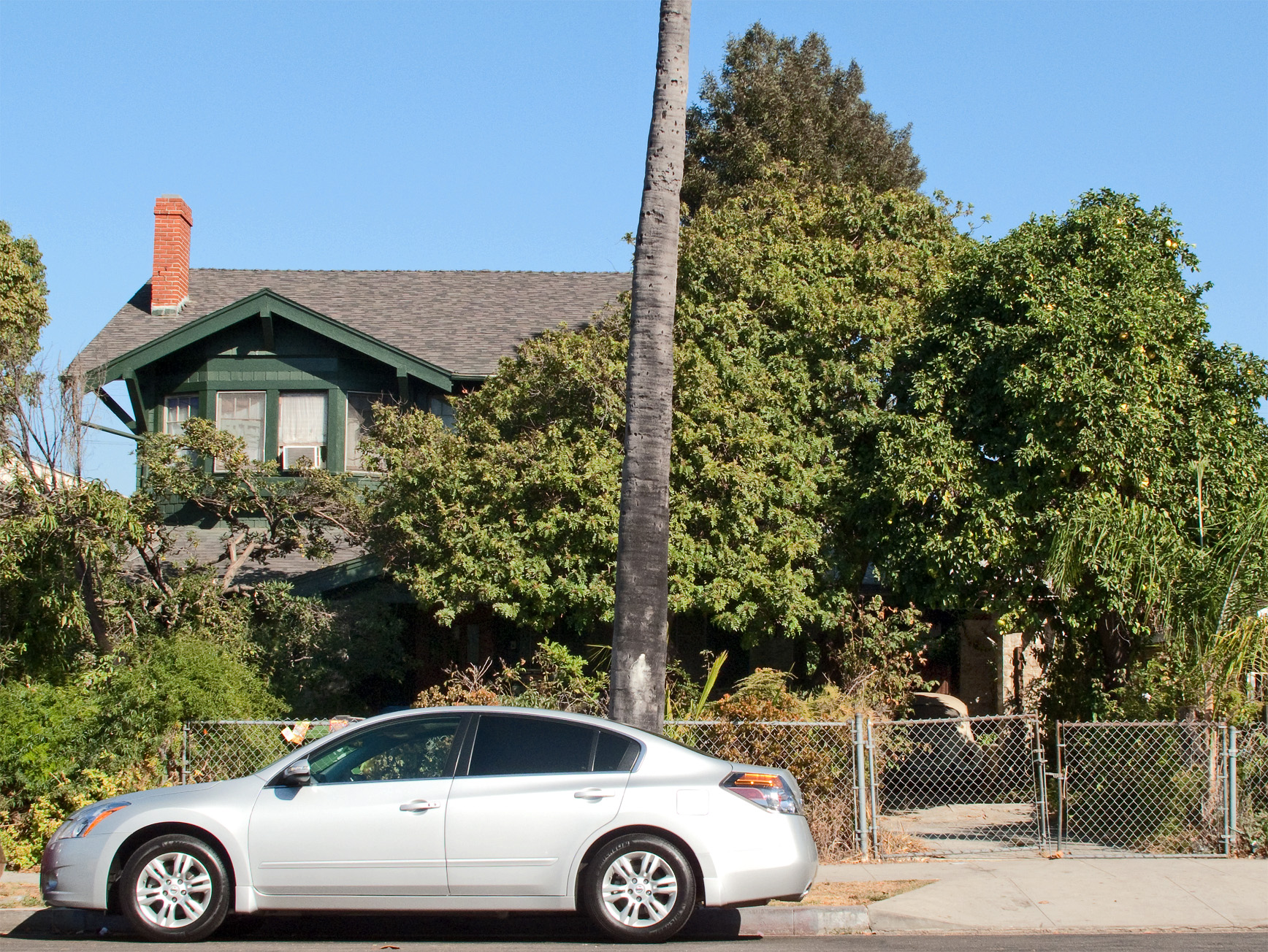
Julius Bierlich Residence, 1818 S. Gramercy Place, Harvard Heights, Los Angeles.

== Personal life and death ==
Tyler lived in Harvard Heights, Los Angeles. With his wife, Lillian B Burkhard, he had two sons, Donald Burkhart Tyler and Walter Harry Tyler.

Tyler died in San Luis Obispo, California, at the age of 85.
