= Lucy E. Wheeler/Martin E. Weil House =

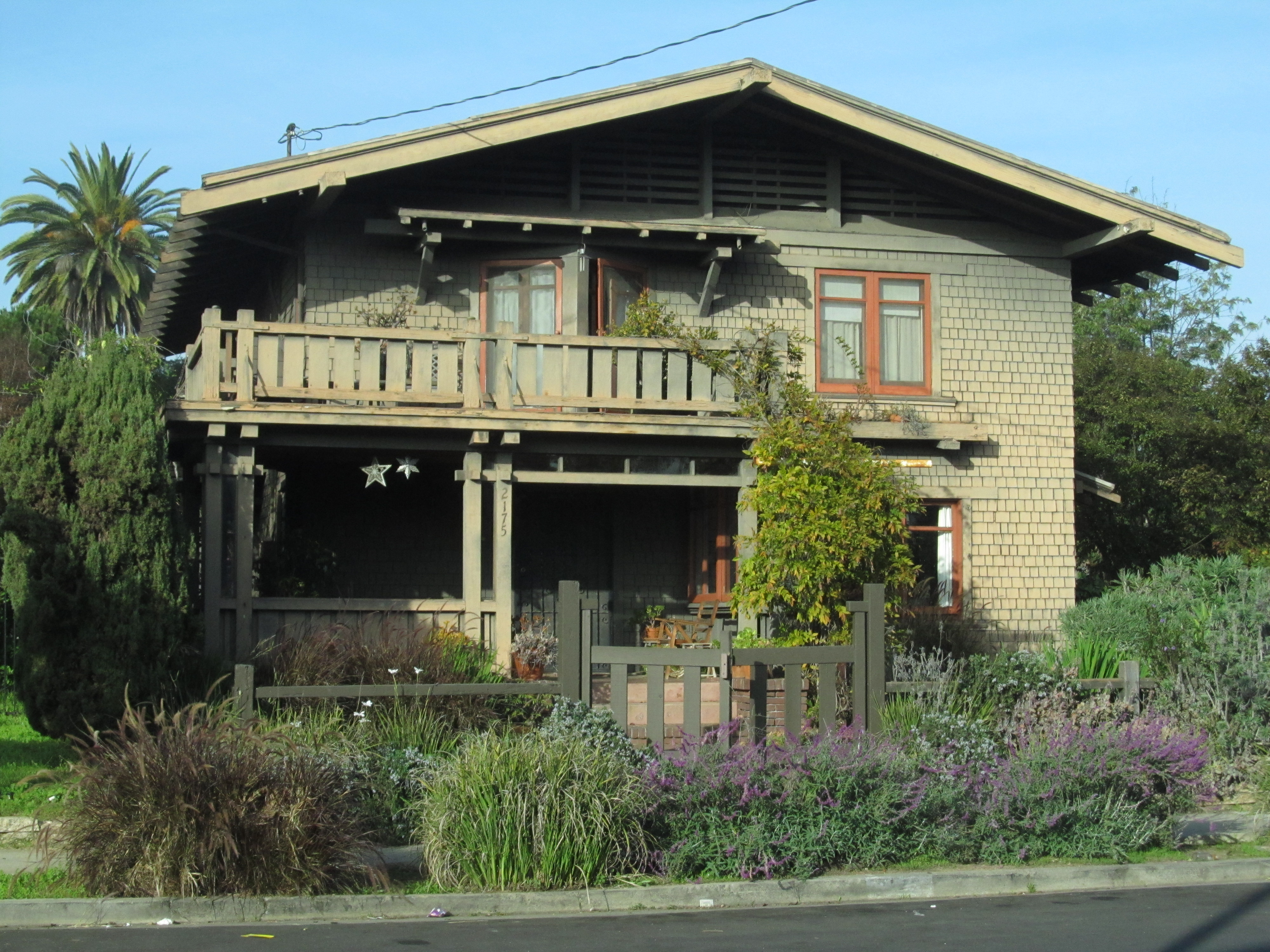
- Lucy E. Wheeler/Martin E. Weil House

- Location within Los Angeles
- 34°02′40.94″N 118°18′25.42″W
- Location: 2175 Cambridge Street, Harvard Heights, West Adams District, Los Angeles, California

History
- Built: 1905

Site notes
- Architect: Greene and Greene
- Architectural style: American Craftsman

Los Angeles Historic-Cultural Monument
- Designated: November 3, 2010
- Reference no.: 991

The Lucy E. Wheeler/Martin E. Weil House is Los Angeles Historic-Cultural Monument No. 991. It is located in the Harvard Heights neighborhood within the larger West Adams District of Los Angeles, California. It is a Arts and Crafts home designed by Greene and Greene. It is the last remaining Green and Greene house in the city.

== History ==
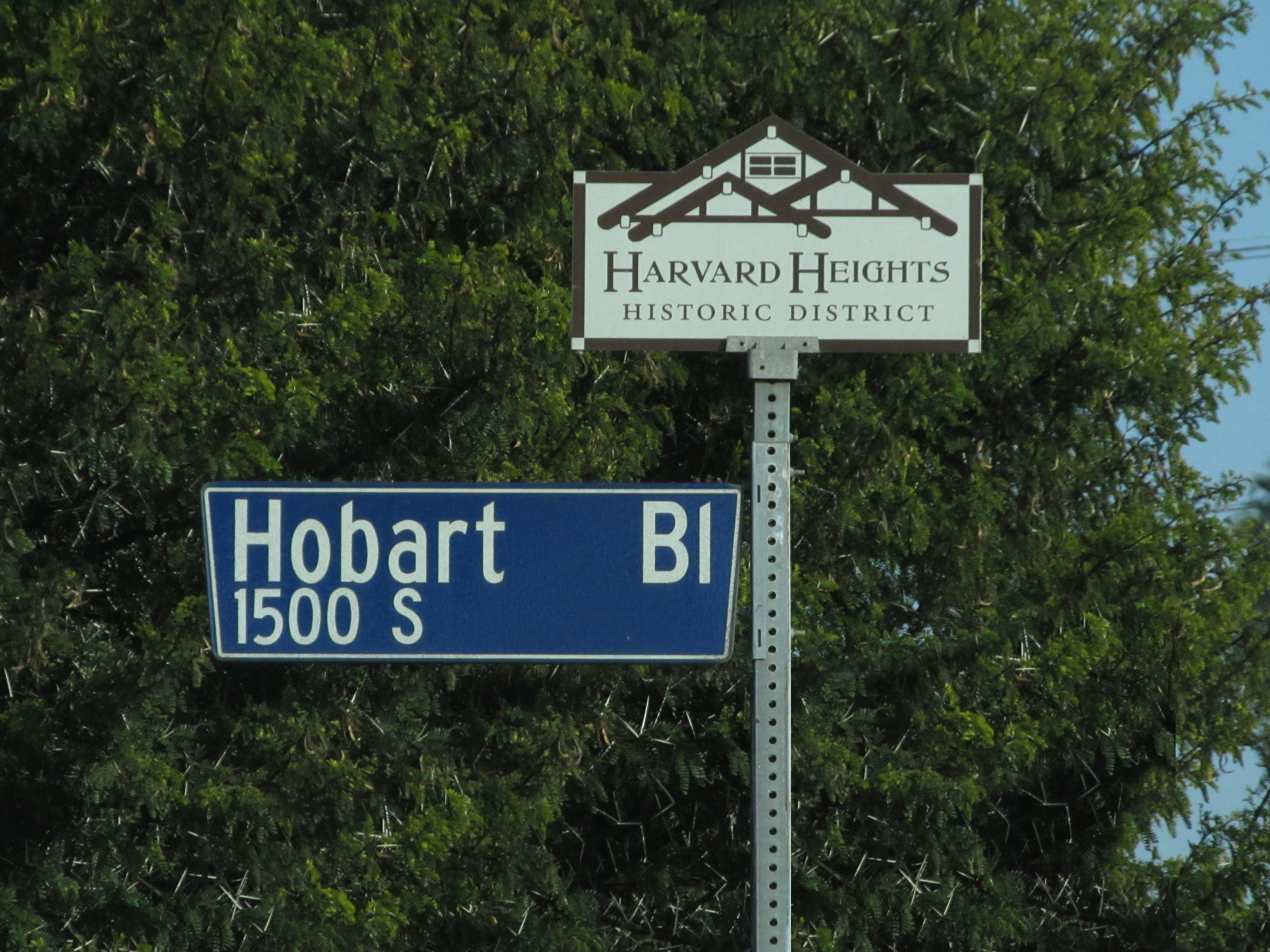
The house is located within the Harvard Heights Historic Preservation Zone

The Lucy E. Wheeler/Martin E. Weil House, a two-story 2620 square-foot Craftsman style home, was designed by architect brothers Charles Sumner Greene and Henry Mather Greene. It is located in the Harvard Heights neighborhood within the West Adams District of Los Angeles. It is the only remaining residence in the city of Los Angeles designed by Greene & Greene.

The home was commissioned by businesswoman Lucy Wheeler (1872–1962). She was the proprietor of a stenography and mimeograph service whose clients included the Greenes.

In 1917, architects Robert F. Train and Robert E. Williams were hired to make alterations that included the addition of a full-length front porch.

After the Santa Monica Freeway cut through West Adams in the 1960s, the neighborhood went into a decline. Another Greene and Greene home was located just south of the Wheeler home and was demolished in the 1970s.

In 1985, the home was purchased by Martin Eli Weil, co-founder of the Los Angeles Conservancy, for $135,000. Weil spent two decades restoring the house. His meticulous restoration work included restoring the original Greene and Greene finishes and paint colors, and returning the house back to its early appearance. The home includes original Greene and Greene-designed interior elements, including light fixtures, built-ins, and hardware. According to the Los Angeles Times, the home is protected by Historic Preservation Overlay Zone restrictions, as well as an "exceptionally detailed" easement with the Los Angeles Conservancy with restrictions that include maintaining the original colors in the entry, dining and living rooms along with keeping the original "rustic" kitchen. (Future owners would be allowed to change the upstairs colors and add a new kitchen in the rear addition to the house.) Weil died at age 68 in 2009.

In 2010, the home was designated Los Angeles Historic-Cultural Monument No. 991. Previously referred to as the Lucy Wheeler House, the City Council renamed it the Lucy E. Wheeler/Martin E. Weil House .
