= West Adams Heights, Los Angeles =

West Adams Heights
- Neighborhood of Los Angeles
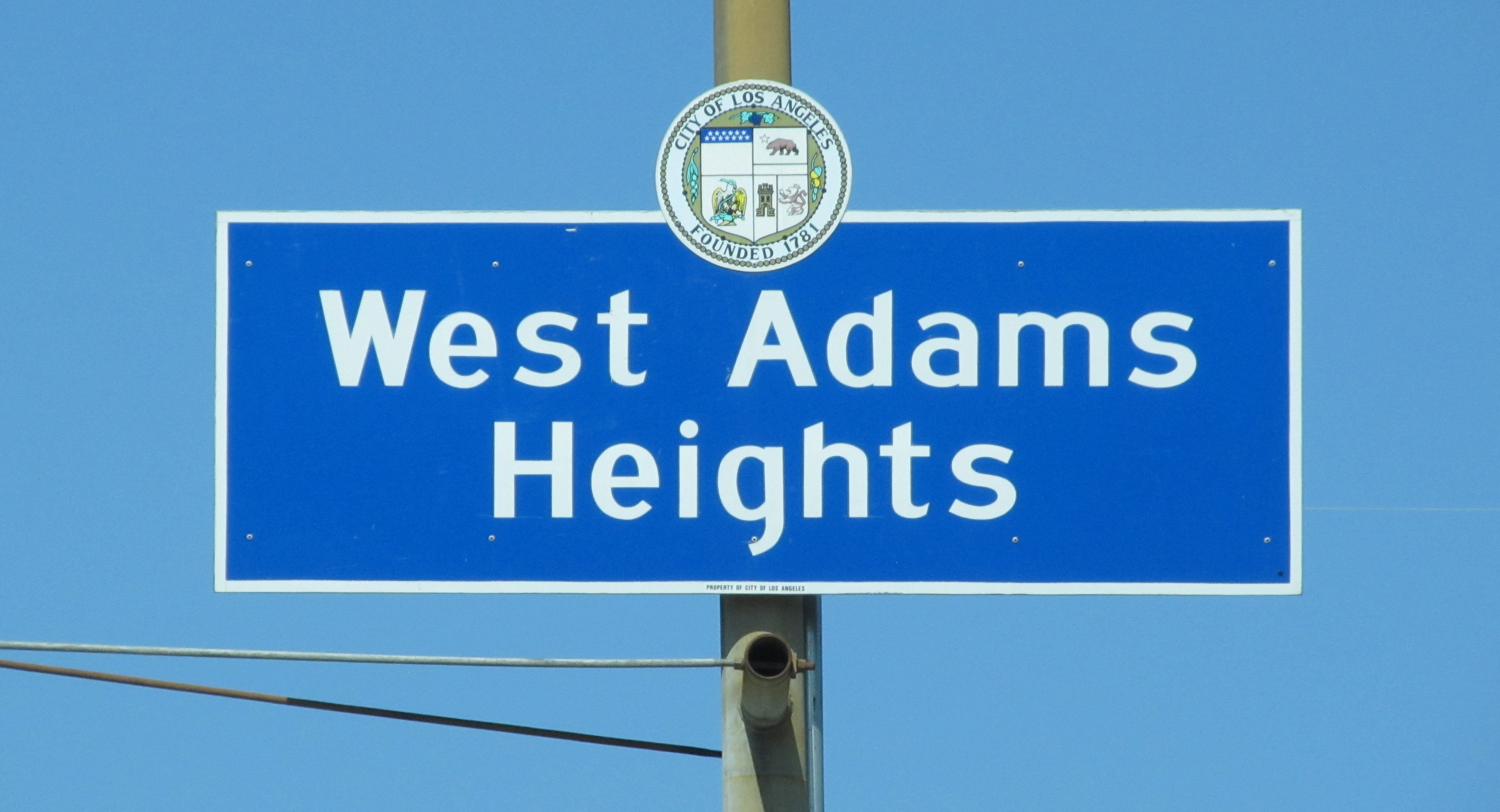
- West Adams Heights neighborhood sign located at the intersection of Western Avenue and the Santa Monica Freeway

- Location within Los Angeles
- Coordinates: 34.0394°N 118.3058°W
- Country: United States of America
- State: California
- County: Los Angeles
- Time zone: Pacific
- Zip Code: 90018
- Area code: Area code 323

West Adams Heights is a neighborhood in Central Los Angeles, California. It contains three Los Angeles Historic-Cultural Monuments.

== History ==
The West Adams Heights tract was laid out in 1902. The original neighborhood boundaries were Washington Boulevard on the north, La Salle Avenue on the east, Adams Boulevard on the south, and Western Avenue on the west. The development had improvements such as: 75-foot-wide boulevards, some of the first contoured streets not to follow the city grid, lots elevated from the sidewalk and ornate street lighting. The entrances on Hobart, Harvard, and Oxford streets, south of Washington Boulevard are marked with stone pillars with the inscription “West Adams Heights.”

Many of the neighborhood's early residents were required to sign a restrictive covenant. Amongst requirements such as building a “first-class residence,” of at least two stories, costing no less than two-thousand dollars (at a time when a respectable home could be built for a quarter of that amount, including the land), and built no less than thirty-five feet from the property’s primary boundary,” residents were also prohibited from selling or leasing their property to people of color. By the mid 1930s, most of the restrictions had expired, making space for non-white residents to move into the neighborhood. Between 1938 and 1945, prominent African-Americans moved to West Adams Heights. Residents included Golden State Mutual Insurance Company president Norman O. Houston, actress Hattie McDaniel, civil rights activists John and Vada Sommerville, actress Louise Beavers, band leader Johnny Otis, performers Pearl Bailey and Ethel Waters.

On December 6, 1945, some of the white West Adam Heights residents filed a lawsuit against 31 Black residents—including McDaniel. McDaniel held workshops to strategize for the case and gathered around 250 sympathizers to accompany her to court. Judge Thurmond Clarke left the courtroom to see the disputed neighborhood and threw out the case the following day. He said, "It is time that members of the Negro race are accorded, without reservations or evasions, the full rights guaranteed them under the 14th Amendment to the Federal Constitution. Judges have been avoiding the real issue too long." McDaniel’s case would go on to set a precedent that later impacted the 1948 Shelley v. Kramer Supreme Court Ruling which in summary states that “holding that state courts may not enforce racially restrictive covenants.”

Time magazine, in its issue of December 17, 1945, reported:

Spacious, well-kept West Adams Heights still had the complacent look of the days when most of Los Angeles' aristocracy lived there. ...

In 1938, Negroes, willing and able to pay $15,000 and up for Heights property, had begun moving into the old eclectic mansions. Many were movie folk — Actresses Louise Beavers, Hattie McDaniel, Ethel Waters, etc. They improved their holdings, kept their well-defined ways, quickly won more than tolerance from most of their white neighbors.

But some whites, refusing to be comforted, had referred to the original racial restriction covenant that came with the development of West Adams Heights back in 1902 which restricted "Non-caucasians" from owning property. For seven years they had tried to enforce it, but failed. Then they went to court. ...

Superior Judge Thurmond Clarke decided to visit the disputed ground—popularly known as "Sugar Hill." ... Next morning, ... Judge Clarke threw the case out of court. His reason: "It is time that members of the Negro race are accorded, without reservations or evasions, the full rights guaranteed them under the 14th Amendment to the Federal Constitution. Judges have been avoiding the real issue too long".

Said Hattie McDaniel, of West Adams Heights: "Words cannot express my appreciation".

In 1963 the Santa Monica Freeway cut through West Adams Heights and divided the neighborhood. In 2006, West Adams Heights signage was installed in the section north of the freeway. In 2012, the city named the section south of the freeway "The Sugar Hill Historic District".

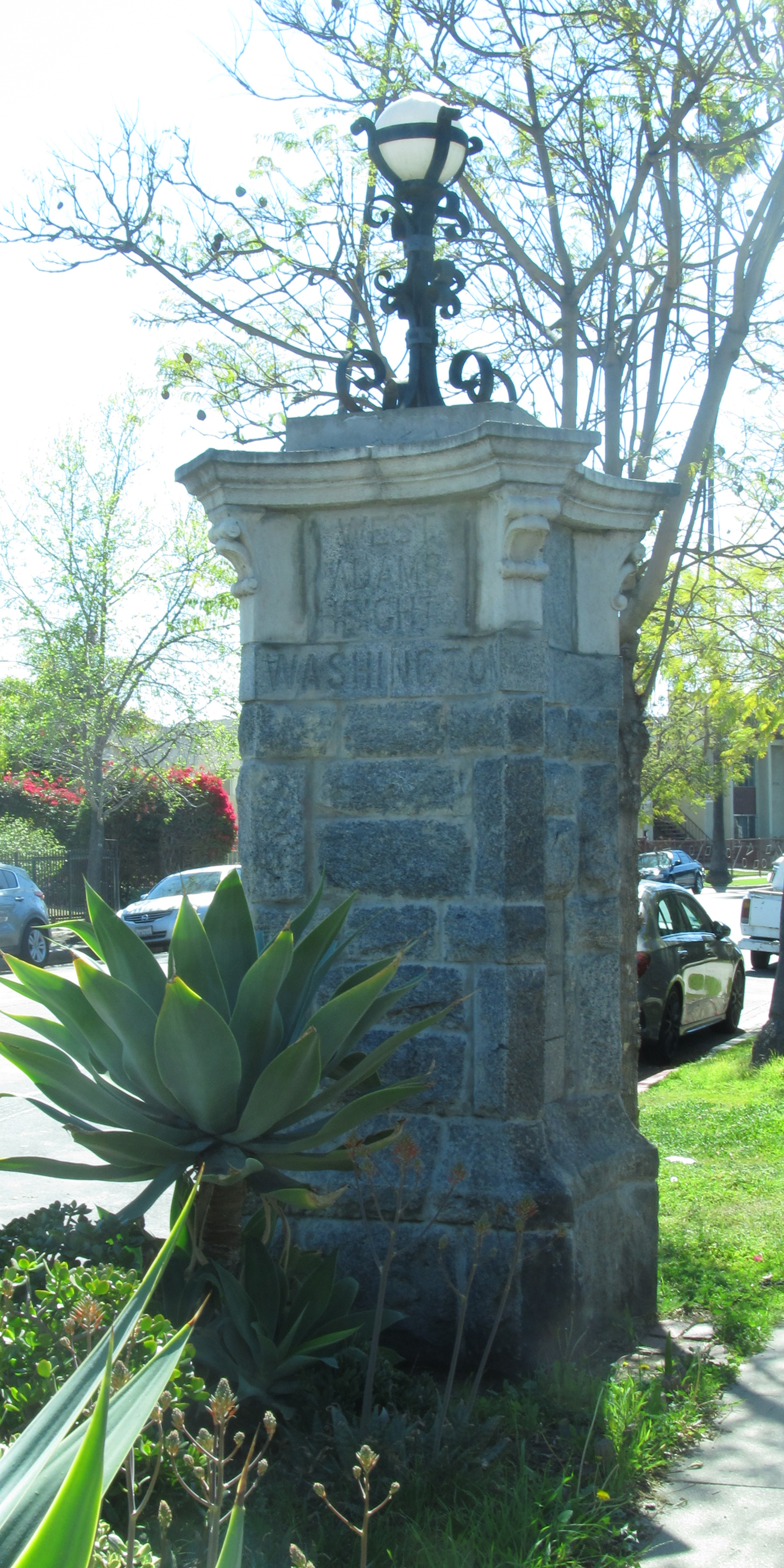
West Adams Heights stone pillar located at Washington Boulevard and Harvard Boulevard

== Geography ==
In April 2006, the city instructed the Department of Transportation to install four "West Adams Heights" signs. Three are along Washington Boulevard: the southeast corner of Washington Boulevard and Western Avenue, Washington Boulevard and LaSalle Street, and the northwest corner of Washington Boulevard and Normandie Avenue. The fourth is at the intersection of Oxford Avenue and Hobart Boulevard (exiting the 10 Freeway).

== Los Angeles Historic-Cultural Monuments ==
There are three Los Angeles Historic-Cultural Monuments in West Adams Heights:

- J.R. Dennison House - Located at 1919 South Harvard Boulevard, the J.R. Dennison House was built in 1913. It was designated LA Historic-Cultural Monument No. 818 on July 13, 2005.
- Marshall-Kline Residence - Located at 2037 S. Harvard Boulevard, the Marshall-Kline Residence was LA Historic-Cultural Monument No. 961 on August 5, 2009.
- Linda Scott Residence - Located at 1910 South Harvard Boulevard, the Linda Scott Residence was built in 1907. It was designated LA Historic-Cultural Monument No. 963 on September 23, 2009.

== Historic Preservation Overlay Zone ==
West Adams Heights lies within the southern portion of the Harvard Heights Historic Preservation Overlay Zone (HPOZ). At the HPOZ public hearing, several speakers suggested an expansion of the proposed Harvard Heights HPOZ boundaries to the south so that the entire West Adams Heights Tract could be included. The survey stated that the area developed with similar architectural designs, and within the same time frame as the proposed preservation area, but the construction of the Freeway separated the neighborhood.

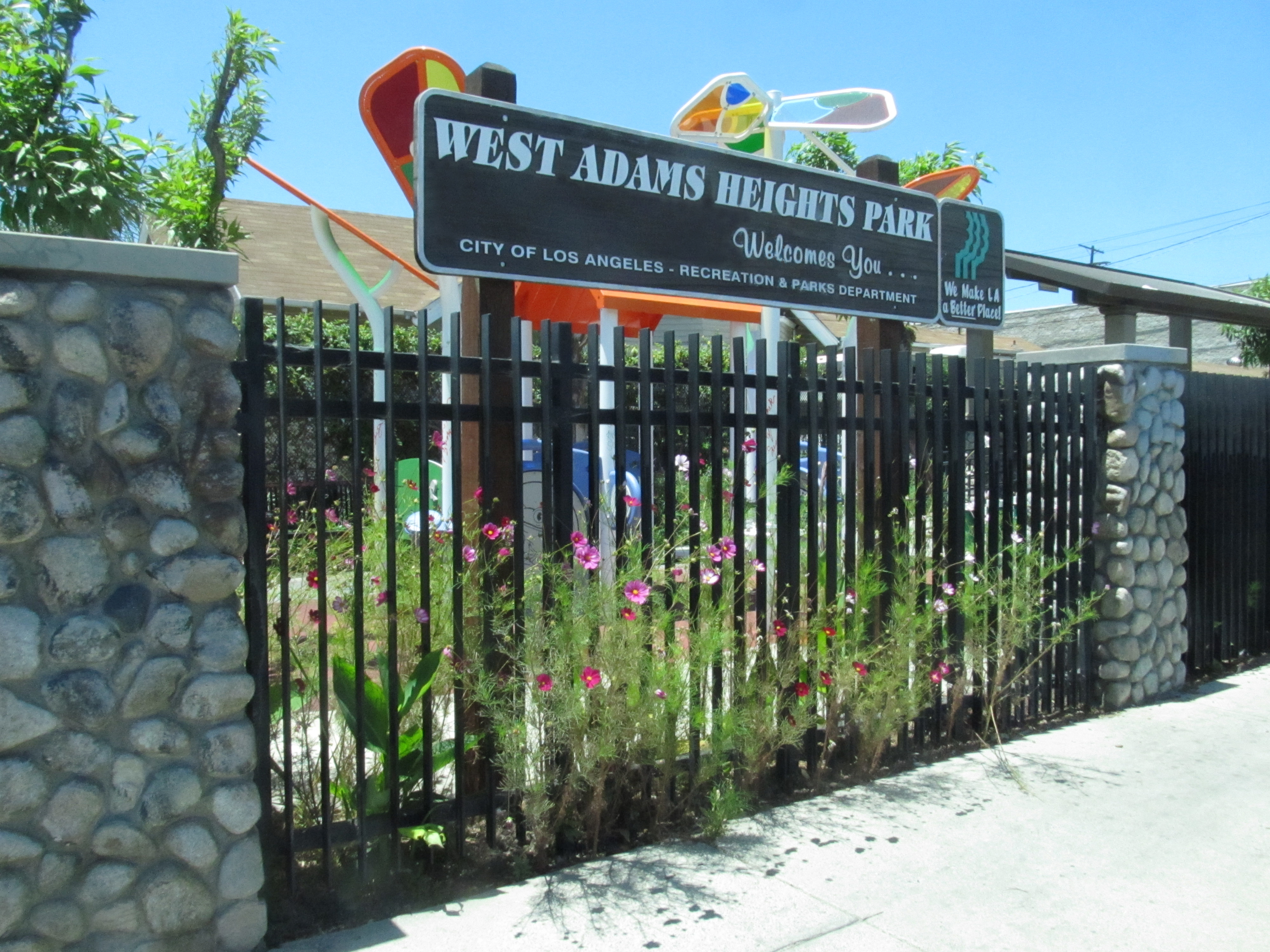
West Adams Heights Park, 2026

== Parks and recreation ==
West Adams Heights Park - Located at 1903 West Cordova Avenue, the park is .08 acres with a children's playground, walking path, fencing, lighting, and landscaping. It was funded by Prop. 84 (Statewide Park Development and Community Revitalization Program) and completed on May 18, 2015. City Council President Herb Wesson attended the 2013 groundbreaking ceremony.
