= South Serrano Avenue Historic District =

Historic district in California, United States

- U.S. National Register of Historic Places
- U.S. Historic district
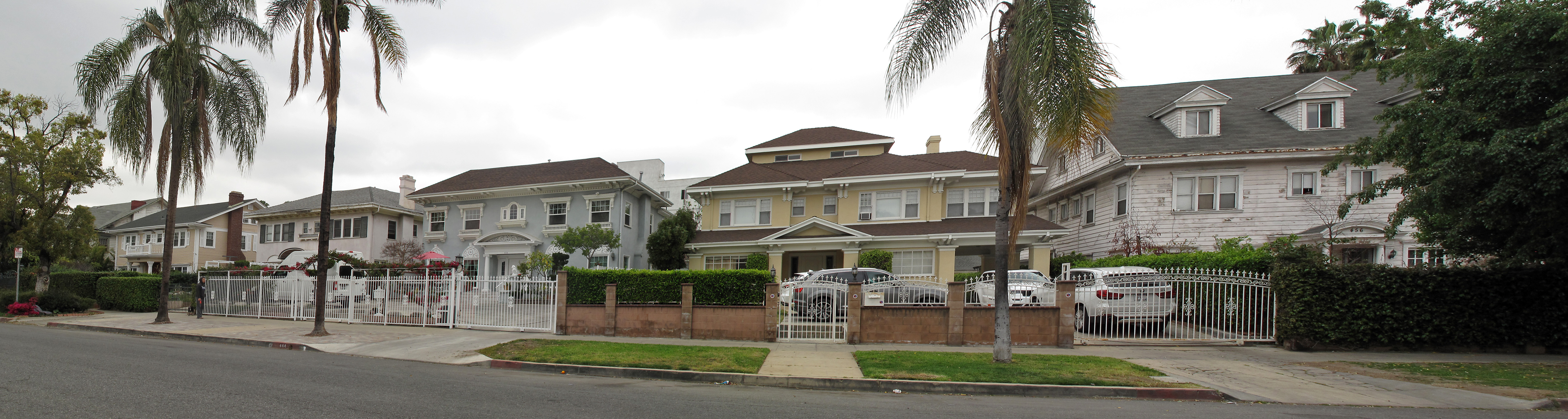
- Five houses on the east side of the block

- Location within Los Angeles
- Location: 400 blk. of S. Serrano Ave., Los Angeles, California
- Coordinates: 34°3′59″N 118°18′20″W
- Area: 5.2 acres (2.1 ha)
- Built: 1912
- Architect: Frank M. Tyler and others
- Architectural style: Late 19th and 20th Century Revivals, Prairie School
- NRHP reference No.: 87002407
- Added to NRHP: January 28, 1988

The South Serrano Avenue Historic District is a historic district of early 20th century homes along the 400 block of South Serrano Avenue in the Mid City section of Los Angeles, California. The block of well-preserved homes was added to the National Register of Historic Places in 1988.

It is the sole intact block of single family homes in an area having many large apartment buildings.

The listing included 17 houses counted as contributing buildings, one non-contributing residence, and two vacant lots. All of the houses were built during the period from 1912 to 1921.

Several of the buildings were designed by architect Frank M. Tyler:

- William & Mary Glascock House (1914), 451 S. Serrano Avenue
- Ellen and John Bolieu House (194), 414 S. Serrano Avenue
- Jose & Concepcion A. de Samaniego House (1914), 420 S. Serrano Avenue

Architect Harry Hayden Whiteley, who had worked in Tyler's office from 1907 to 1910, also designed some works in the district, and architect Henry J. Knauer designed one: the house at 403 S. Serrano Avenue.

== Gallery of homes in South Serrano Historic District ==
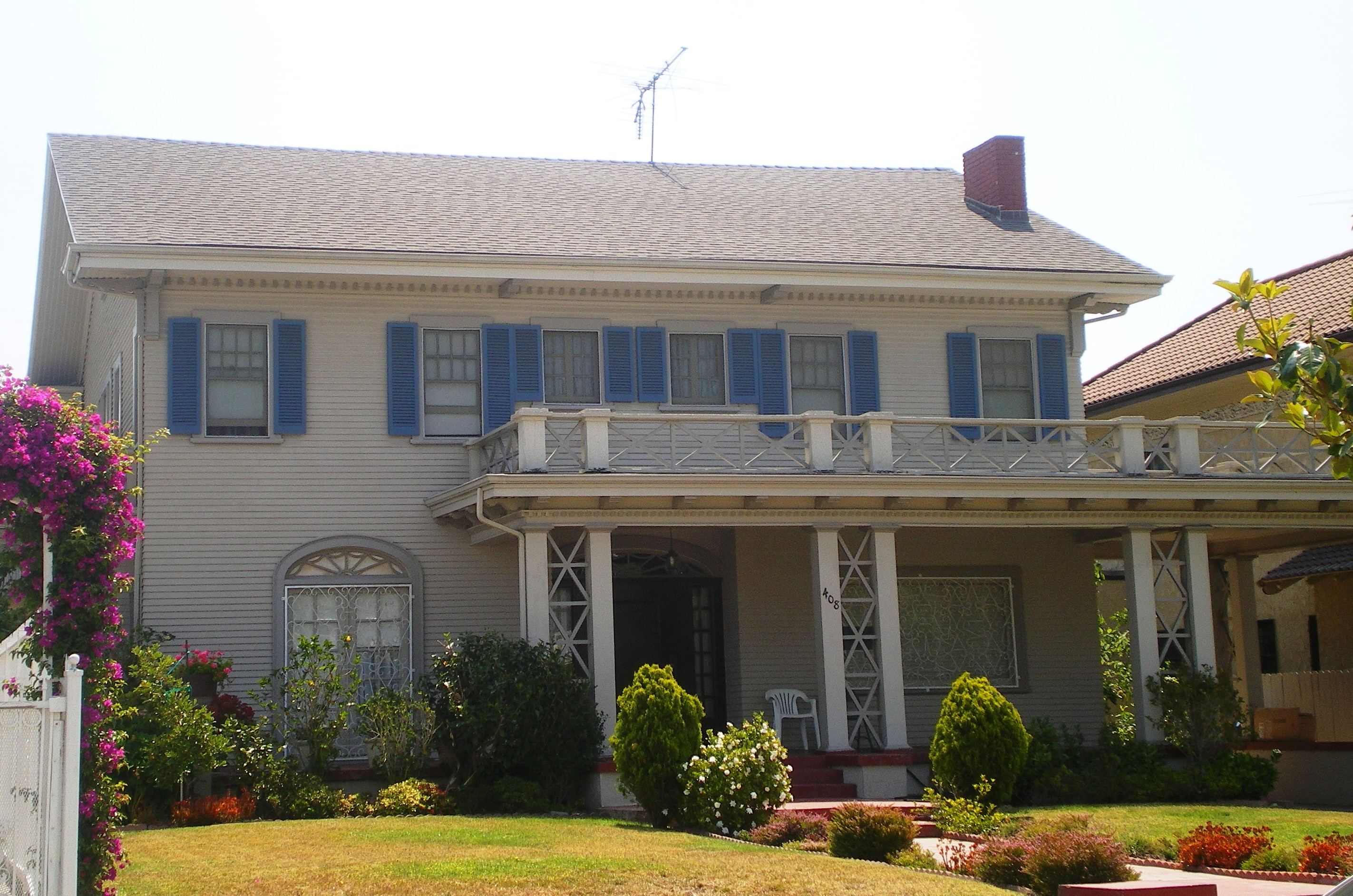
House at 208 S. Serrano

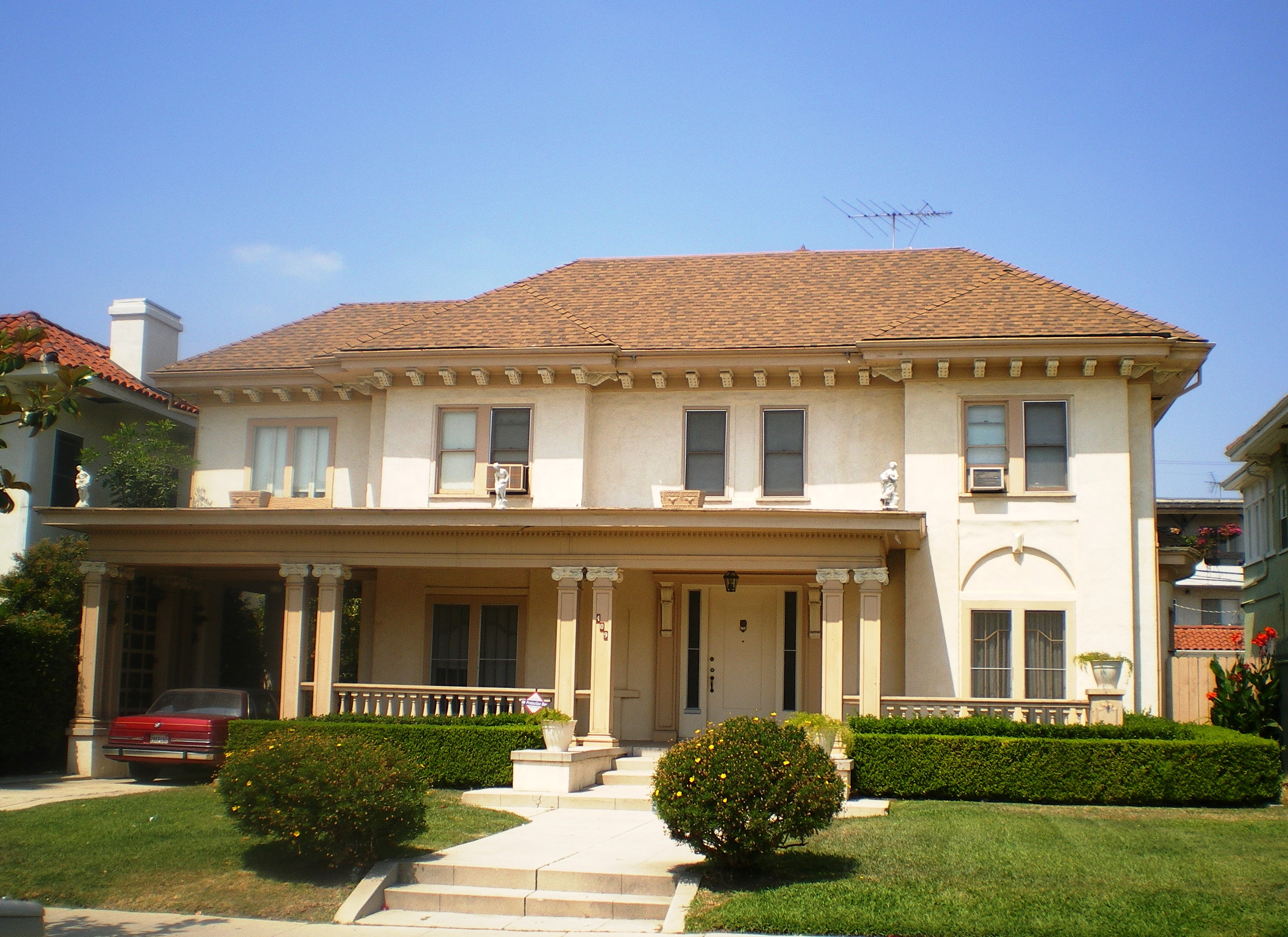
House at 409 S. Serrano

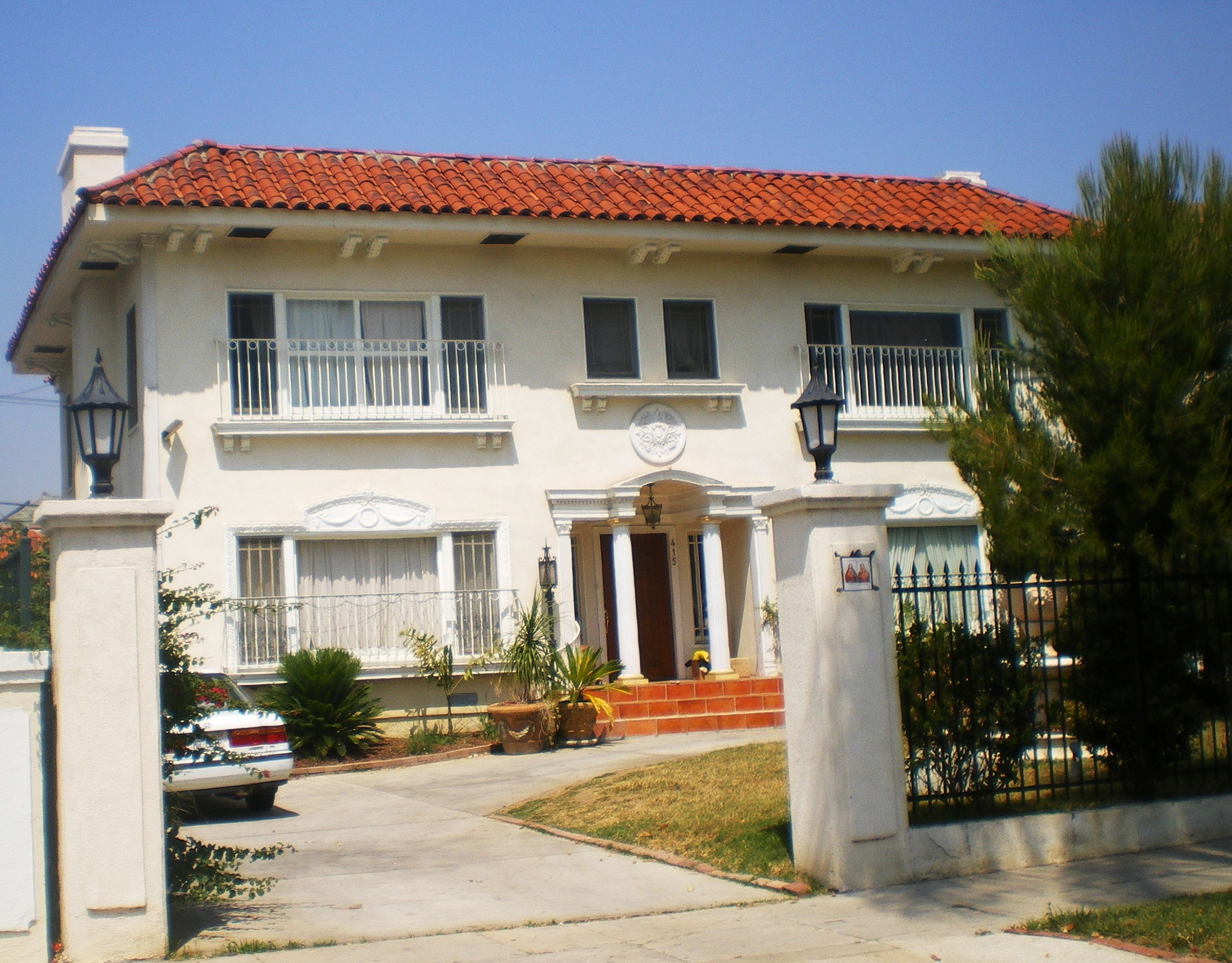
House at 415 S. Serrano

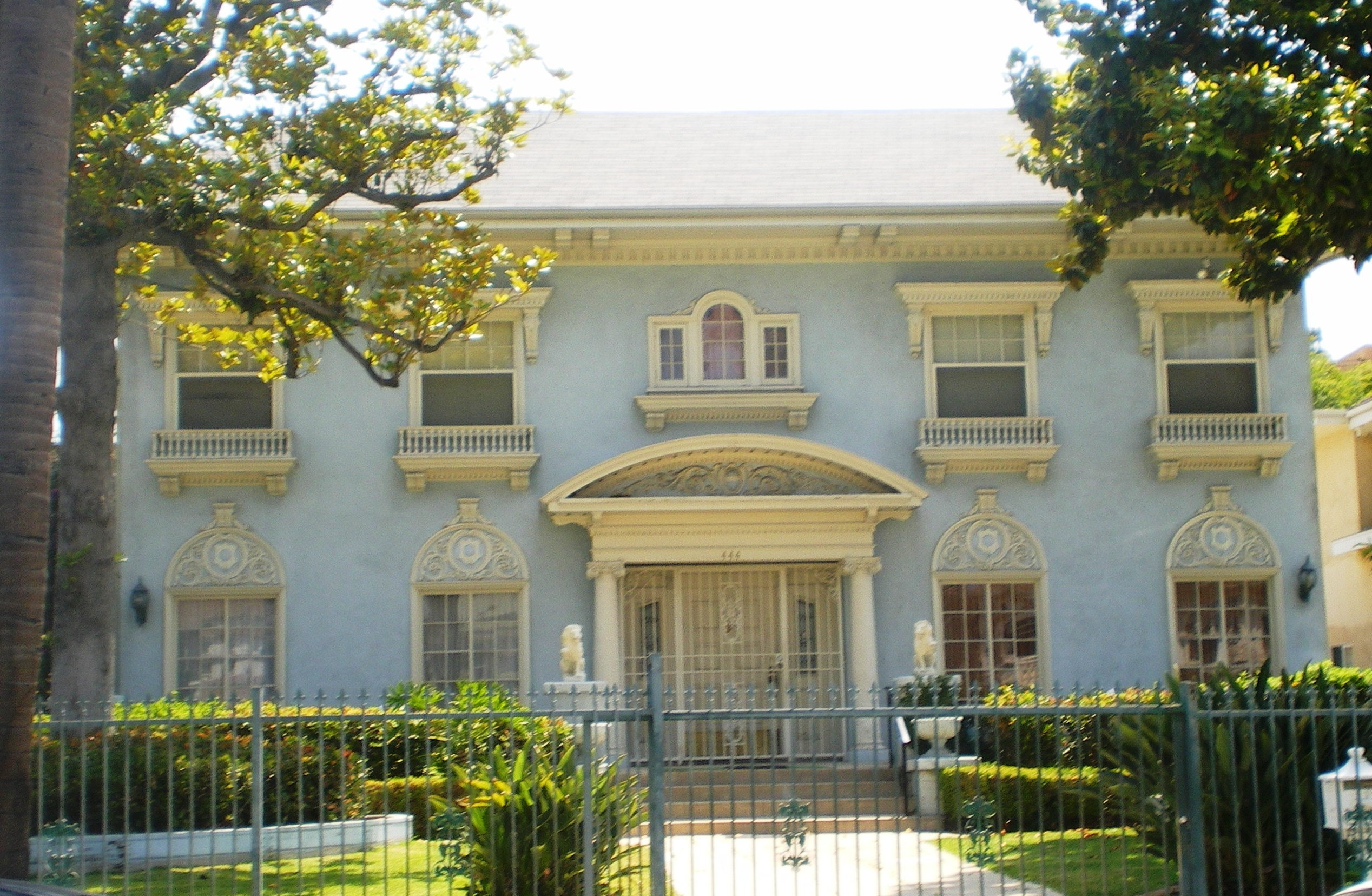
House at 444 S. Serrano

== See also ==
- List of Registered Historic Places in Los Angeles
