= Gustaf Edward Trinkkeller =

American ironworker

Gustaf Edward Trinkkeller (1872 - September 6, 1945), who did business as Edward G. Trinkkeller, was a noted decorative wrought ironworker active in California.

Trinkkeller was born in Germany in 1872, immigrating to the United States about 1890 after his apprenticeship. In 1896 he established his first workshop at 8th Street and Broadway in Los Angeles, later relocating to 1720 South Main Street. In 1915 Trinkkeller created wrought ironwork for the main lobby of the Los Angeles Examiner building, working for architect Julia Morgan, who subsequently asked Trinkkeller to create ironwork for Hearst Castle at San Simeon, which he did from 1921-1935. His work at Hearst Castle includes doorway grills, window and bookcase grilles, fireplace screens and utensils, gates, and lighting fixtures. His gates for the castle's Casa del Sol guesthouse include 26 profiles of his fellow artisans at the castle, with his own image in the center row at the bottom of the north gate. Trinkkeller's other clients included Edward L. Doheny (Chester Place estate and 34 window grilles for the Doheny Memorial Library at St. John's Seminary in Camarillo, California), Will Rogers, and Cecil B. DeMille.
