= List of tourist attractions in Los Angeles =

The following is a list of important sites of interest in and around the city of Los Angeles.

== 0–9 ==
- 5900 Wilshire
- 777 Tower

== A ==
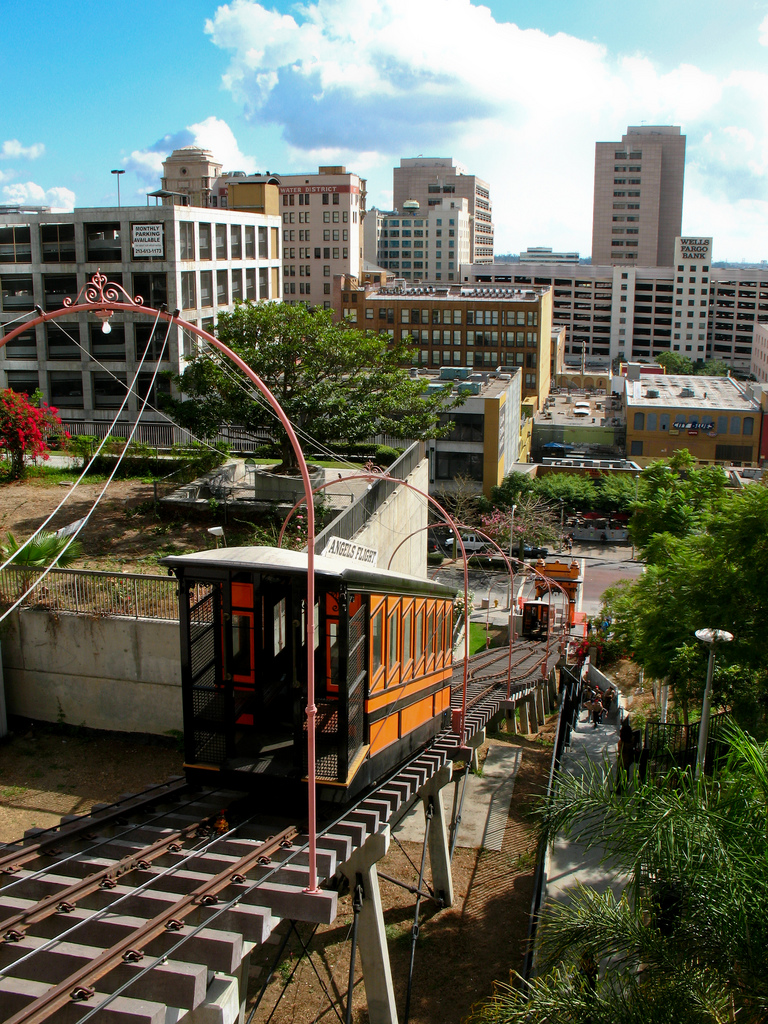
Angel's Flight

- Adamson House
- Ahmanson Theatre
- Alex Theatre (Glendale)
- All Saints Episcopal Church
- Alvarado Terrace Historic District
- Amoeba Music
- Andalusia
- Angelino Heights
- Angels Flight (Downtown Los Angeles)
- Angelus Funeral Home
- Angelus Temple
- Antelope Valley California Poppy Reserve
- The Apple Pan
- Armenian Genocide Martyrs Monument
- Aquarium of the Pacific
- Arroyo Seco
- Arroyo Seco Parkway
- Art Center College of Design (Pasadena)
- Autry National Center

== B ==
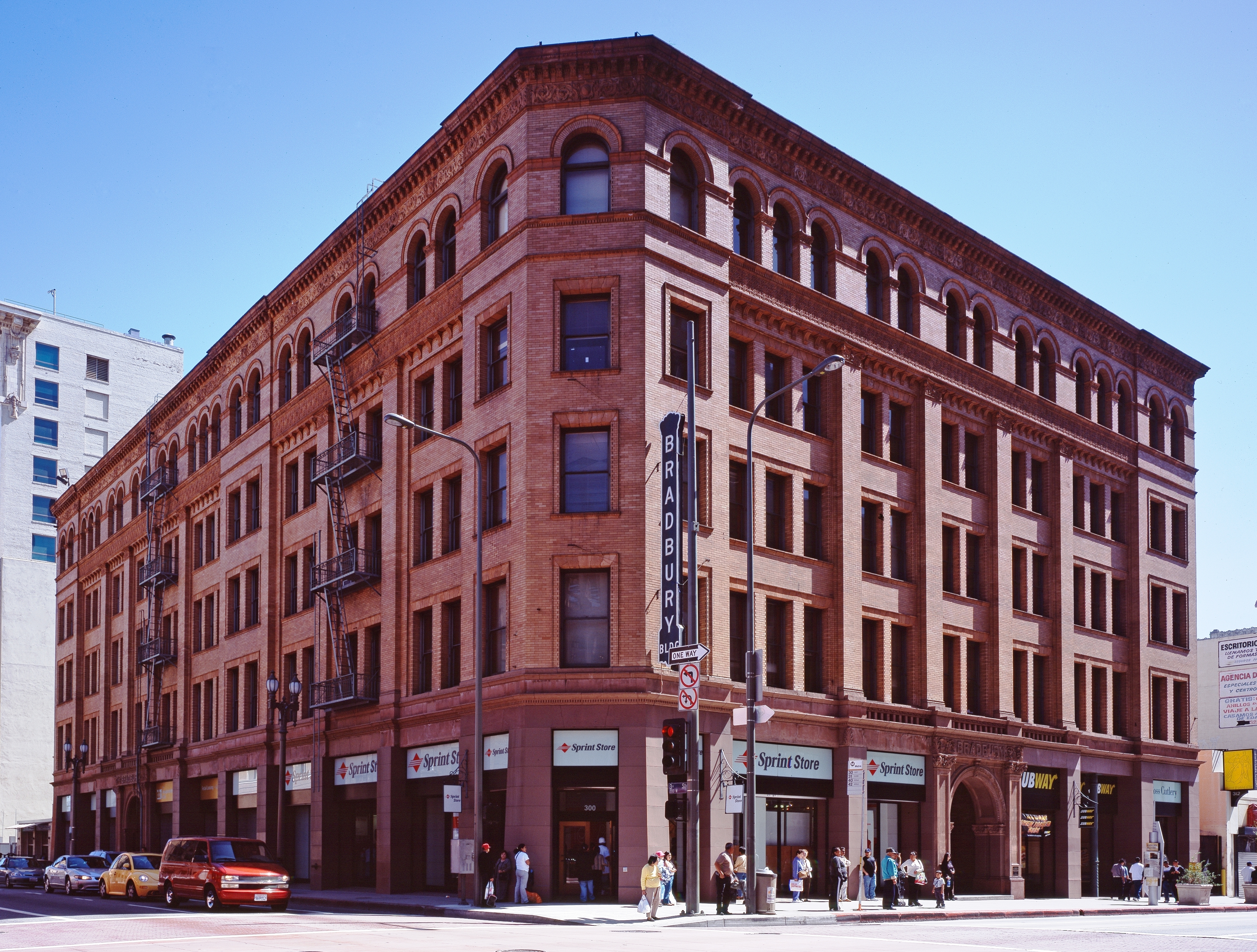
The Bradbury Building

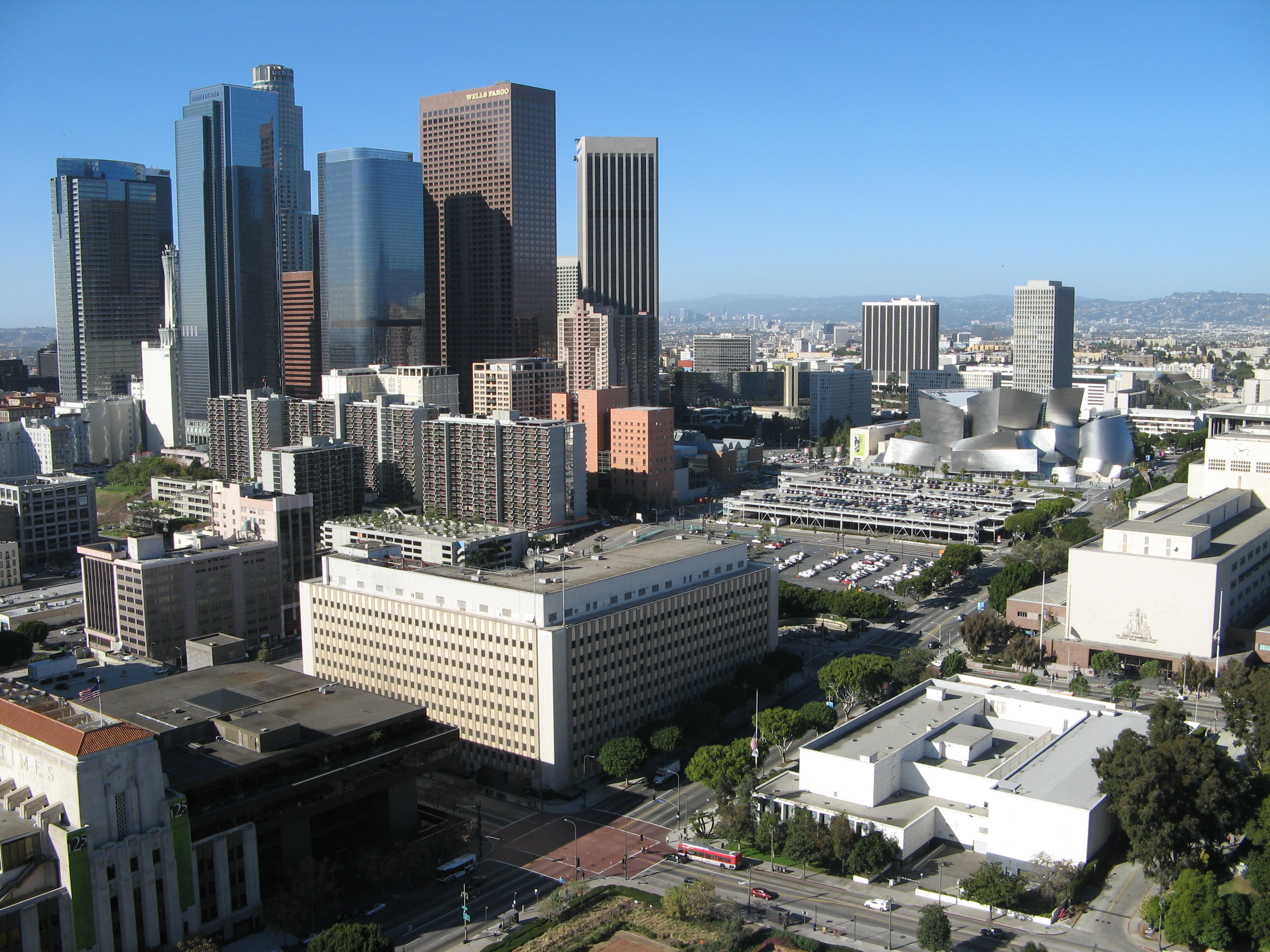
Bunker Hill as seen from Los Angeles City Hall

- Backbone Trail
- Baldwin Hills Village
- Baldwin Hills Crenshaw Plaza (Baldwin Hills)
- Ballona Creek
- Banning House
- BMO Stadium
- Barney's Beanery
- Barnsdall Art Park
- Battleship Iowa Museum (San Pedro)
- The Belmont Tunnel
- Bergamot Station
- Beverly Gardens Park
- Beverly Hills Hotel
- Beverly Wilshire Hotel
- Big Tujunga Dam
- Biltmore Hotel
- Biola University
- Biscuit Company Lofts
- Bob Baker Marionette Theater
- Bolton Hall
- Bonaventure Hotel (Downtown)
- Boyle Heights
- Bradbury Building (Downtown)
- Breed Street Shul
- Broadway Theater District
- Bryson Apartment Hotel
- Bullocks Wilshire
- The Bunny Museum
- The Broad
- Burbank City Hall
- Burbank Studios
- Burro Flats Painted Cave

== C ==
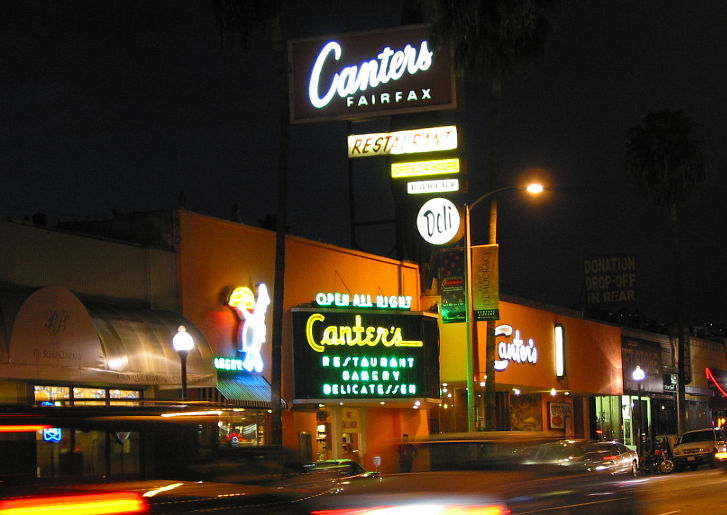
Canter's Deli

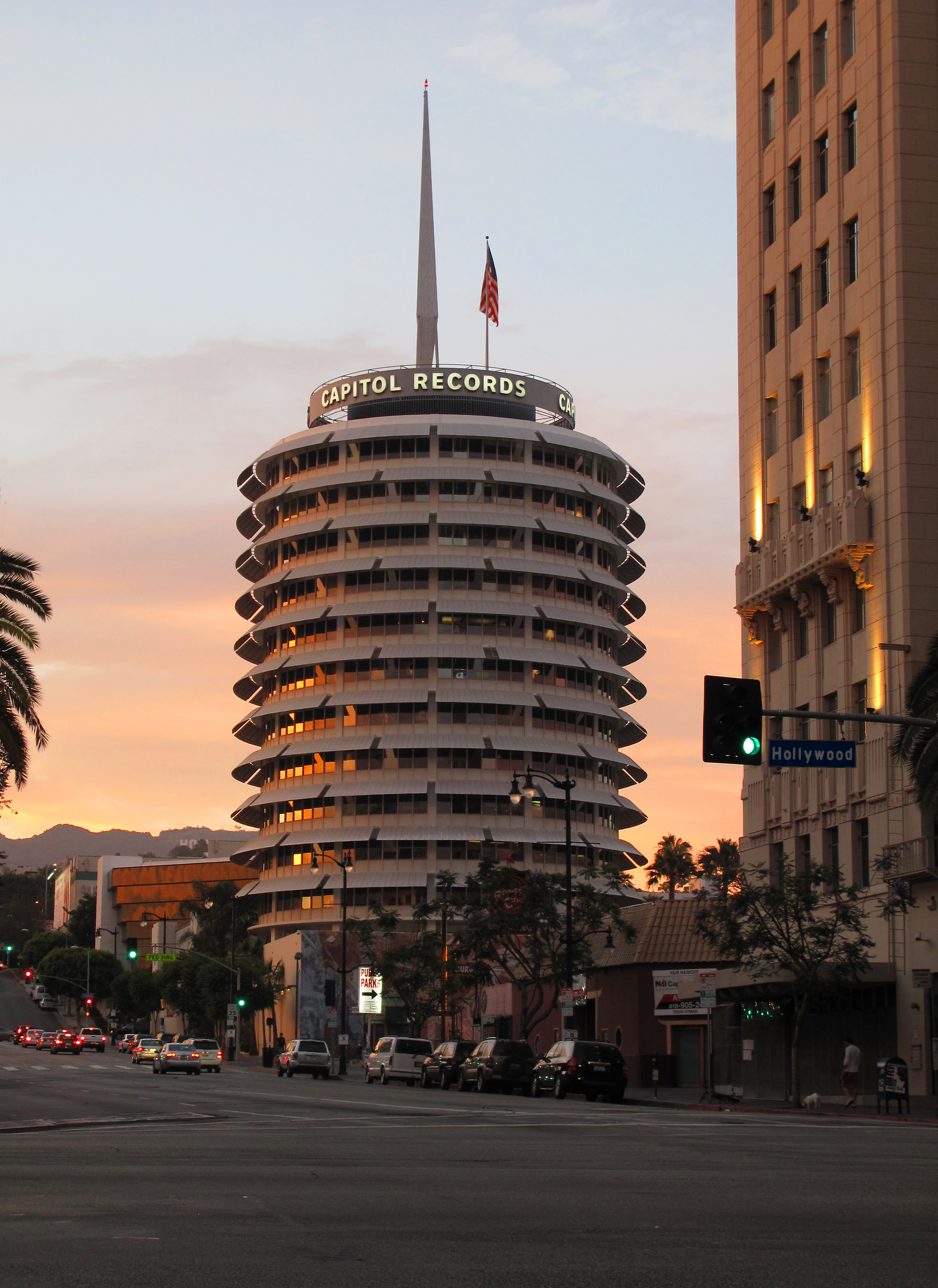
The Capitol Records Building

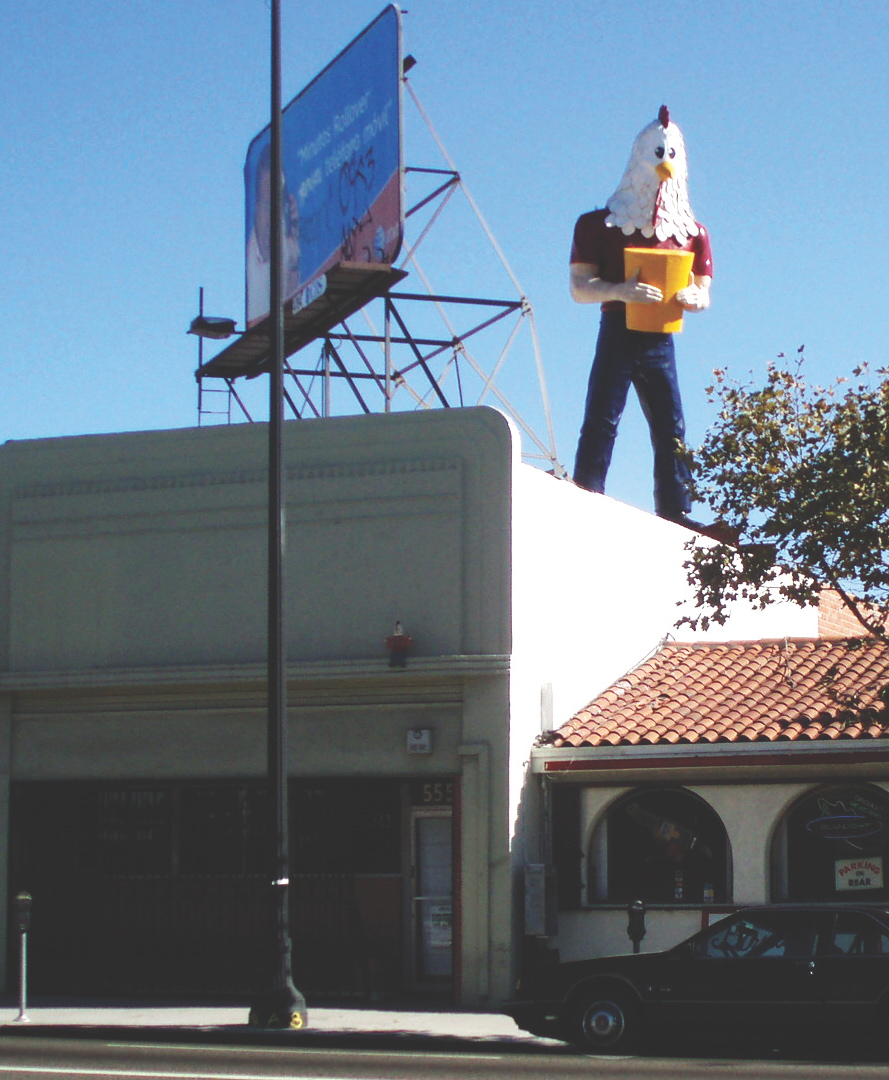
Chicken Boy

- Cabrillo Beach
- Cabrillo Marine Aquarium
- Cafe Brass Monkey
- California African American Museum
- California Club
- California Institute of the Arts (CalArts)
- California Institute of Technology (Caltech)
- California Science Center
- Campo de Cahuenga
- Canter's
- Capitol Records Building
- Carroll Avenue
- Casa de Rosas
- Case Study Houses
- Cathedral of Our Lady of the Angels
- Cathedral of Saint Vibiana
- CBS Studios (Studio City)
- Celebration Theatre
- Central Avenue
- Central Los Angeles Library (Downtown)
- Chain Reaction
- Château Élysée
- Chateau Marmont
- Chavez Ravine Arboretum
- Chemosphere
- Chicken Boy
- Chinatown (Downtown)
- Chinese American Museum
- Chinese Cemetery of Los Angeles
- Chips Coffee Shop
- The Church on the Way
- Cinerama Dome
- Clark House
- Clark Library
- Clifton's Cafeteria
- Coca-Cola Building
- Cole's Pacific Electric Buffet
- Colorado Street Bridge (Pasadena)
- Constance Perkins House
- Convento Building
- Corky's
- Craft Contemporary
- Crenshaw
- Crossroads of the World

== D ==
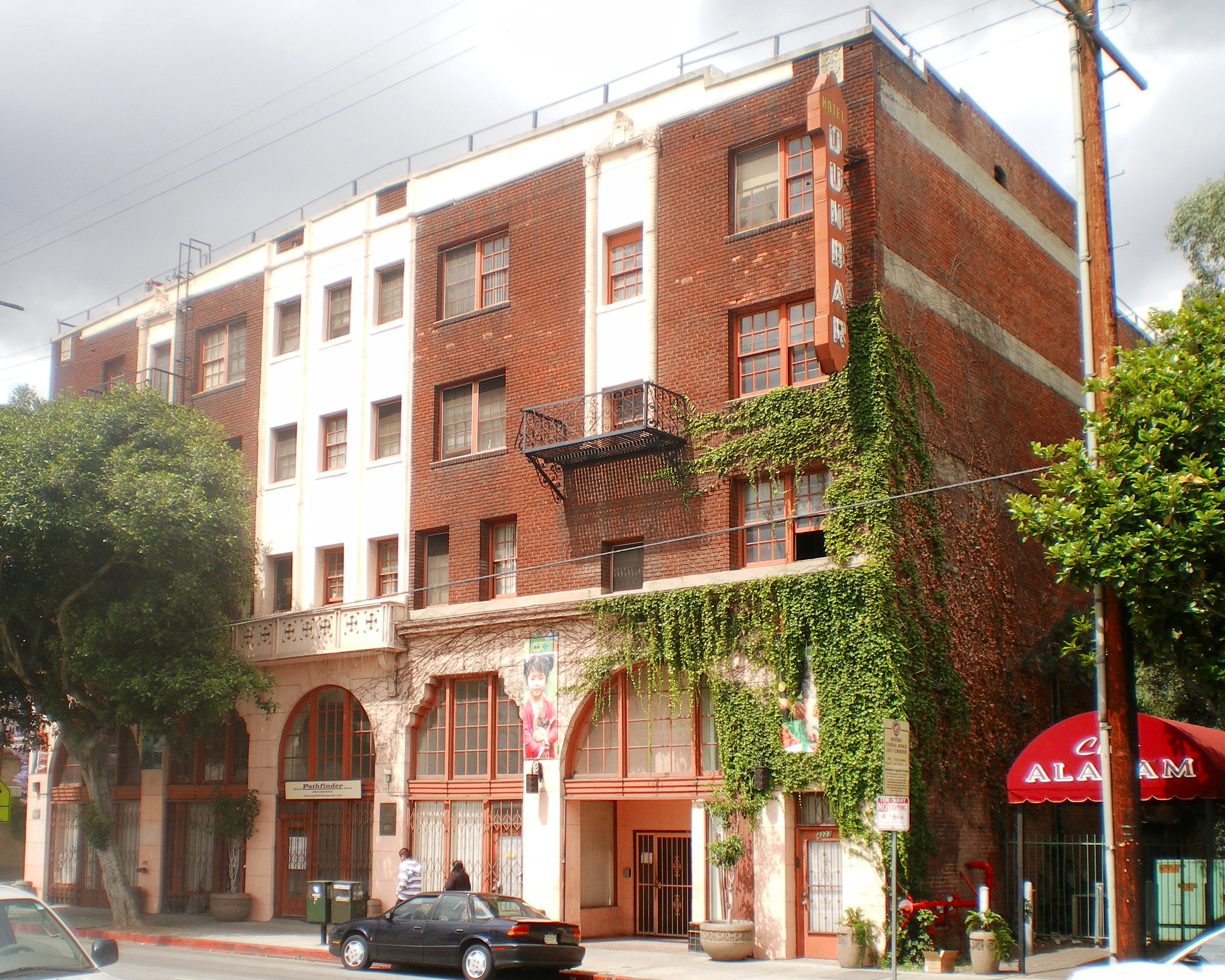
Dunbar Hotel

- Descanso Gardens
- Destination Crenshaw
- Disneyland Resort (Anaheim)
- Dockweiler State Beach
- Dodger Stadium (Chavez Ravine)
- Dolby Theatre (Hollywood)
- Dominguez Rancho Adobe
- Double Ascension
- Drum Barracks
- Dunbar Hotel
- Dignity Health Sports Park

== E ==
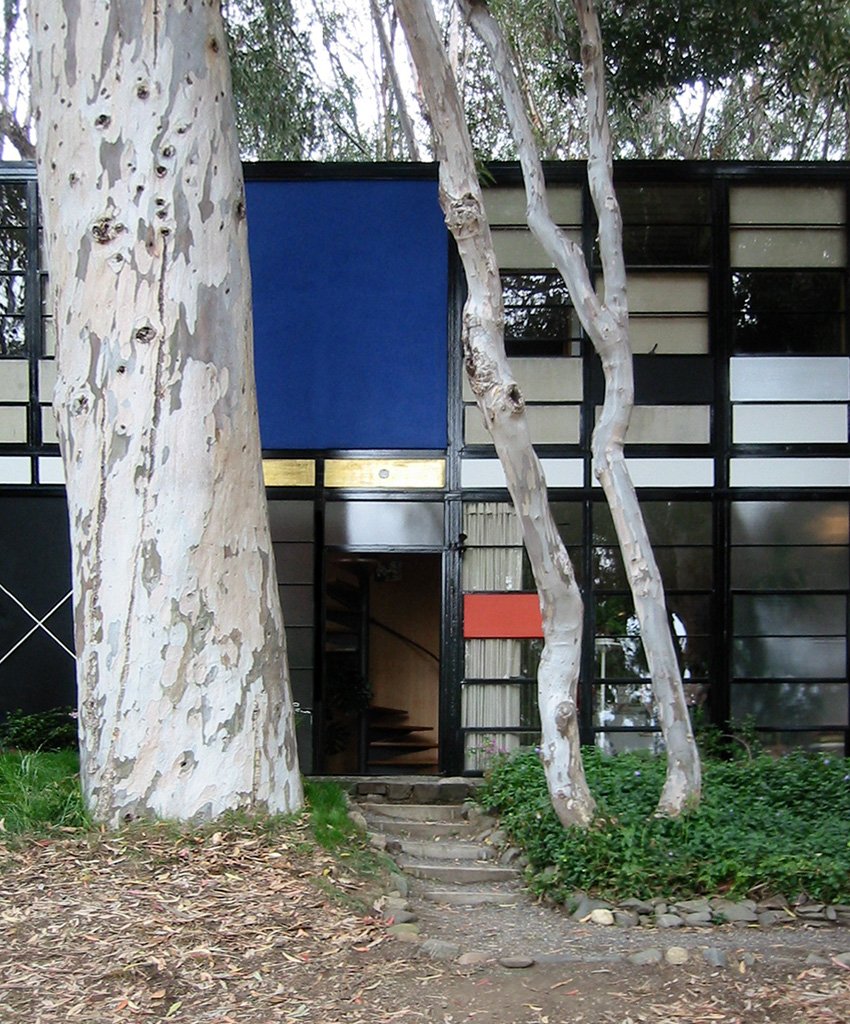
The Eames House

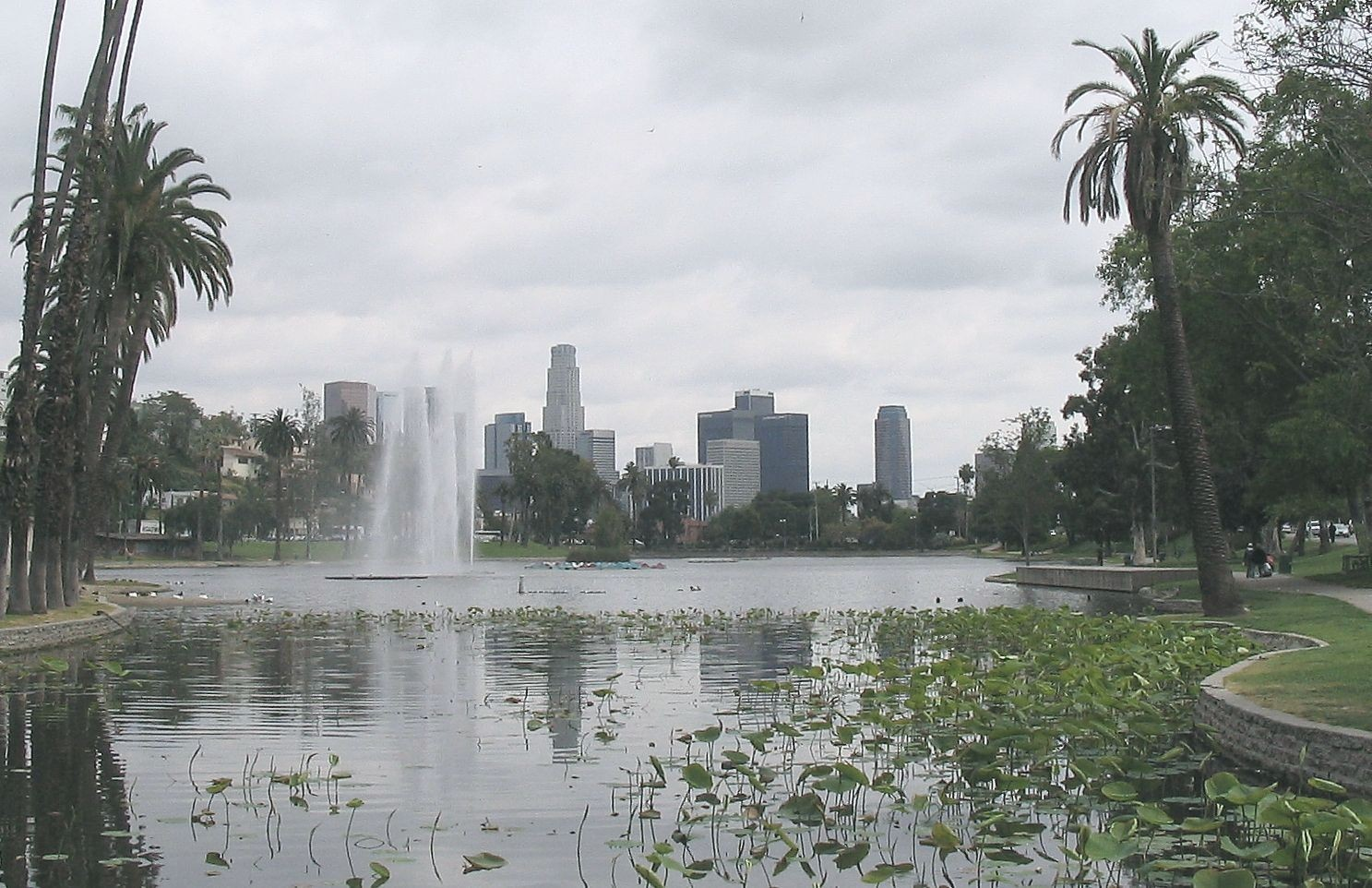
Echo Park

- Eagle Rock
- Eagle Rock Community Cultural Center
- Eames House
- Ebell of Los Angeles
- The Echo
- Echo Park
- El Escorpión Park
- El Pino
- El Rey Theatre
- Electric Fountain
- Elephant Theatre Company
- Elkay Apartments
- Elysian Park
- Emerson Middle School
- Encino Oak Tree
- Ennis House
- Equitable Life Building
- Estrada Courts
- Eugene W. Britt House
- Evergreen Cemetery
- Exposition Park (south of Downtown)
- Exposition Park Rose Garden

== F ==
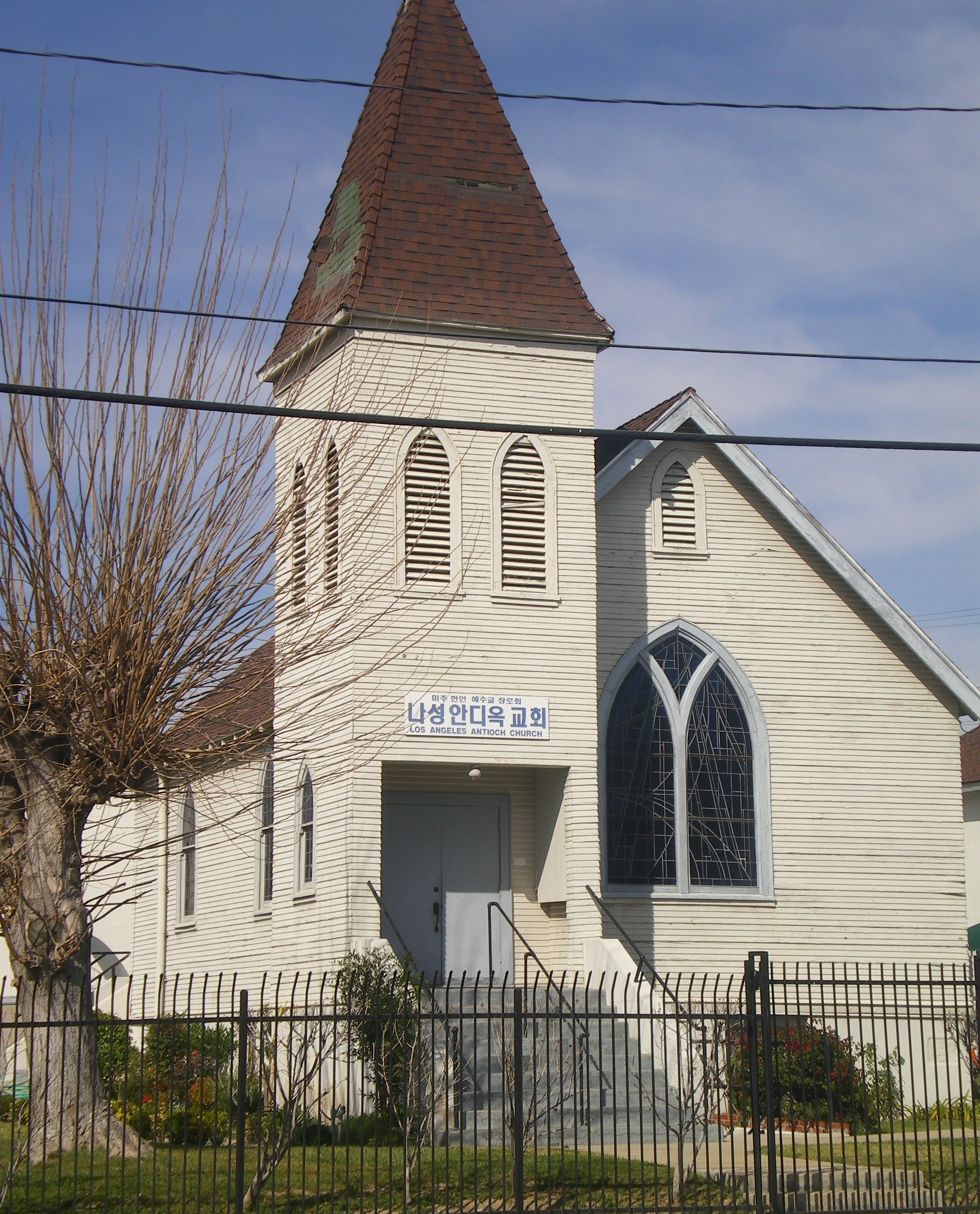
Faith Bible Church

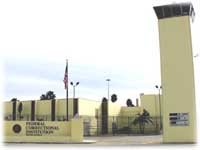
Federal Correctional Institute, Terminal Island

- The Forum (Inglewood)
- Faith Bible Church
- Farmers Market (3rd St. & Fairfax)
- Fashion District
- Fashion Institute of Design & Merchandising
- Federal Correctional Institution, Terminal Island
- Federal Reserve Bank of San Francisco, Los Angeles Branch
- Felipe De Neve Branch
- Figueroa Street Tunnels
- First Church of Christ, Scientist (Long Beach)
- First Church of Christ, Scientist (Los Angeles)
- Flower District
- Forest Lawn Glendale
- Forest Lawn Hollywood
- Fort MacArthur
- Fort Moore Pioneer Memorial
- Fox Bruin Theater
- Fox Village Theater
- Fred C. Nelles Youth Correctional Facility
- Frederick Mitchell Mooers House

== G ==
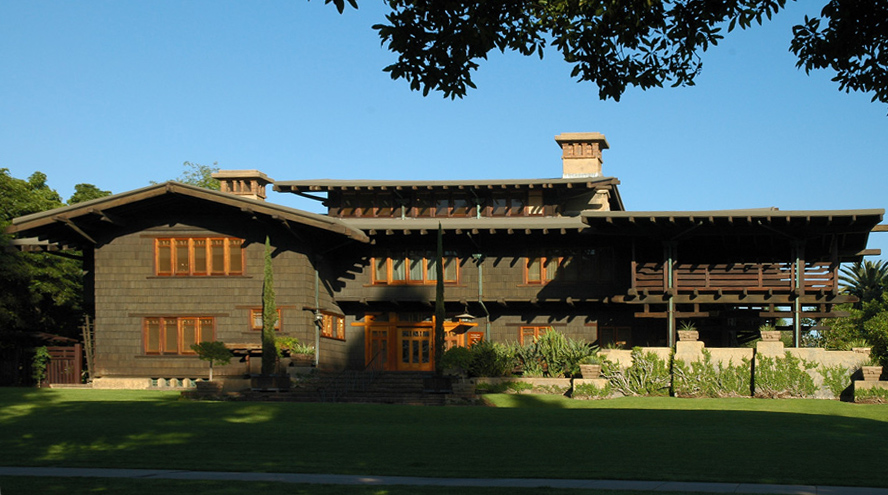
The Gamble House

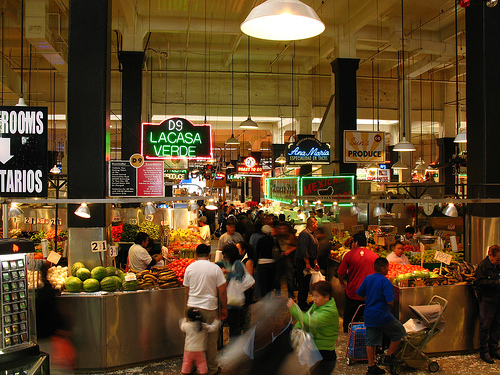
Grand Central Market

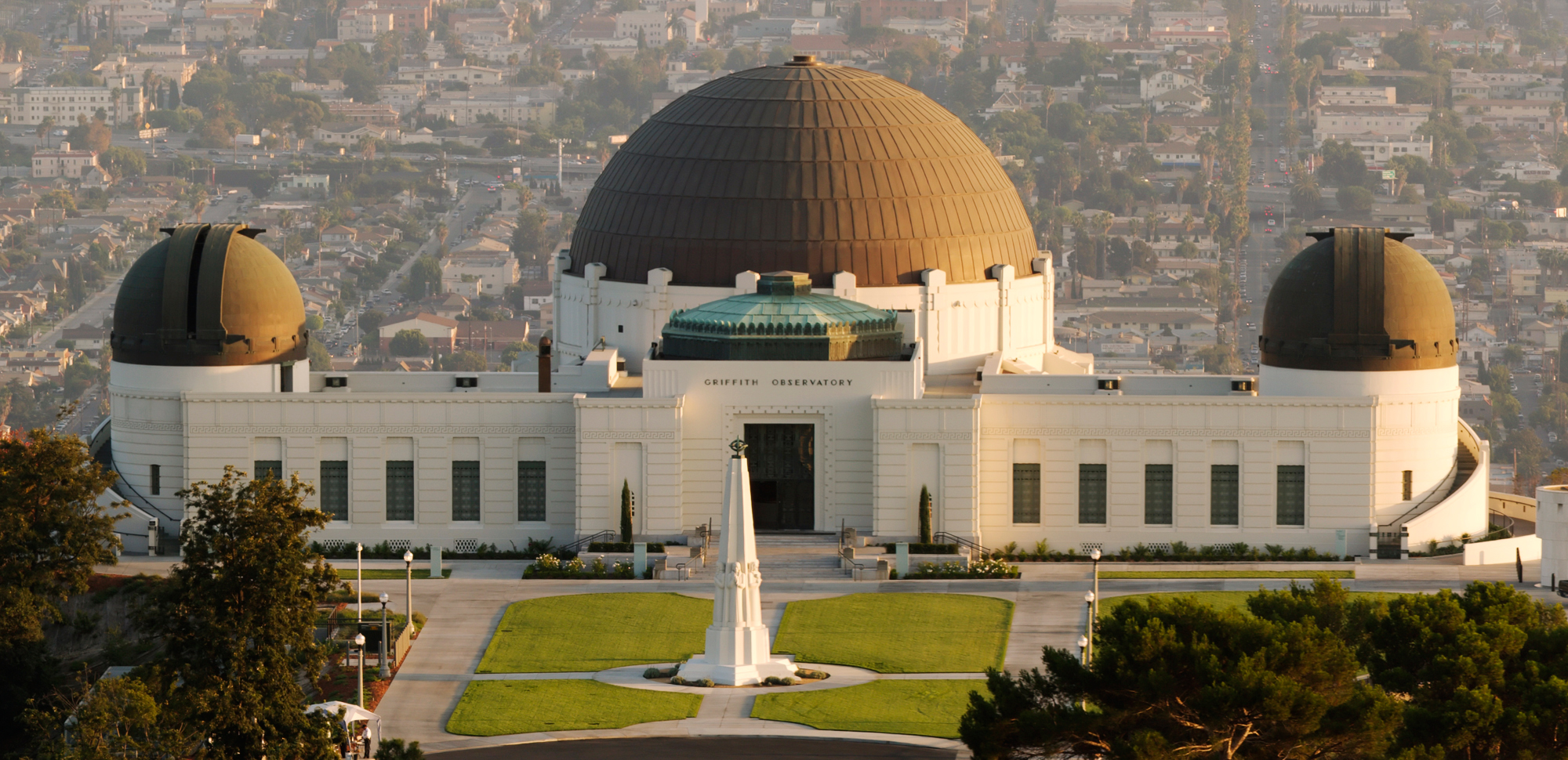
The Griffith Observatory

- The Gamble House
- The Garber House
- Gardena Willows Wetland Preserve
- Garfield Building
- Geffen Playhouse
- General Petroleum Building
- General William J. Fox Airfield
- George R. Kress House
- Gerry Building
- Getty Center
- Glassell Park Elementary School
- Golden Gate Theater
- Golden State Mutual Life Insurance Building
- The Grammy Museum
- The Granada Buildings
- Grand Central Market
- Grand Park
- Grauman's Chinese Theatre (Hollywood)
- Grauman's Egyptian Theatre
- Great Wall of Los Angeles
- The Greek Theatre
- Greystone Mansion
- Griffith Observatory (Griffith Park)
- Griffith Park
- Griffith Park Zoo
- The Grove
- Guaranty Building

== H ==
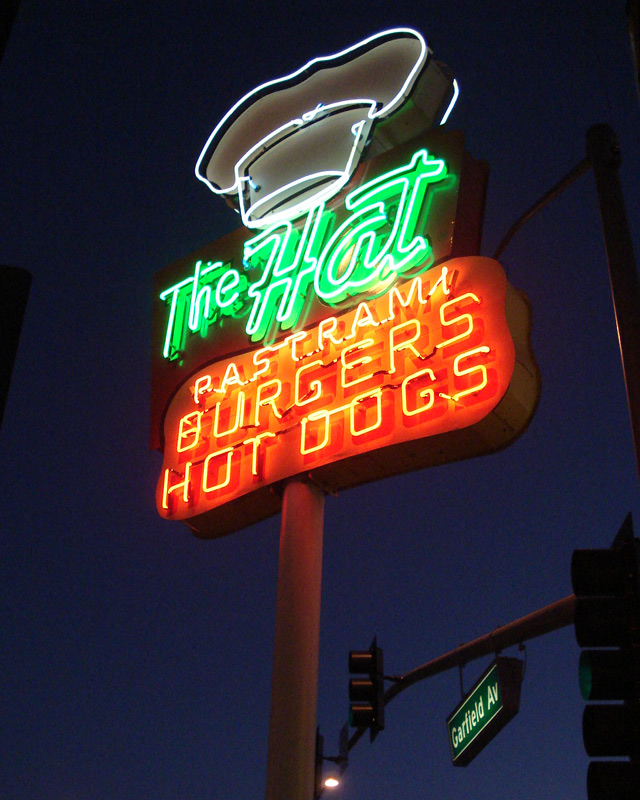
The Hat, Alhambra, California

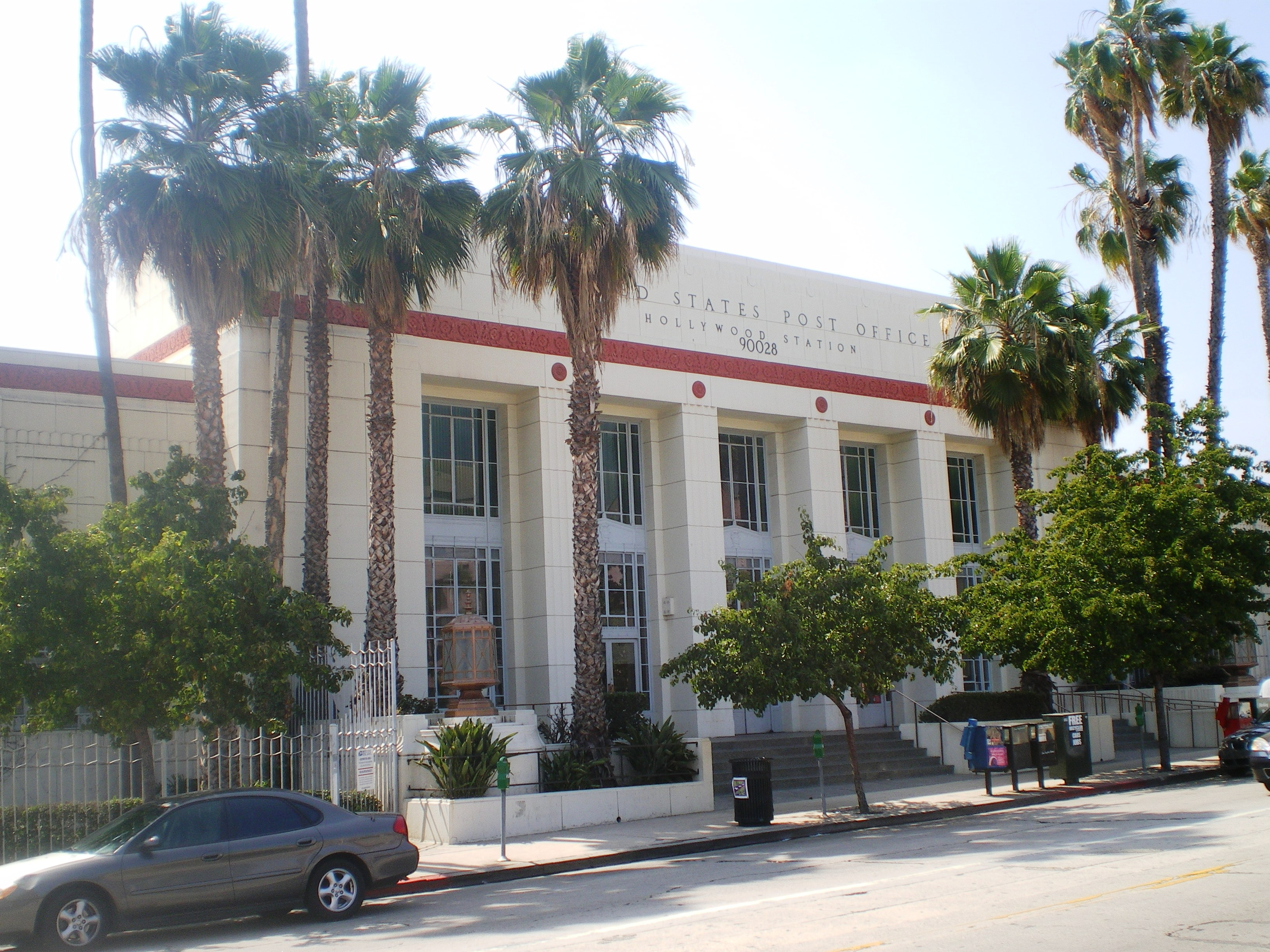
The Hollywood Post Office

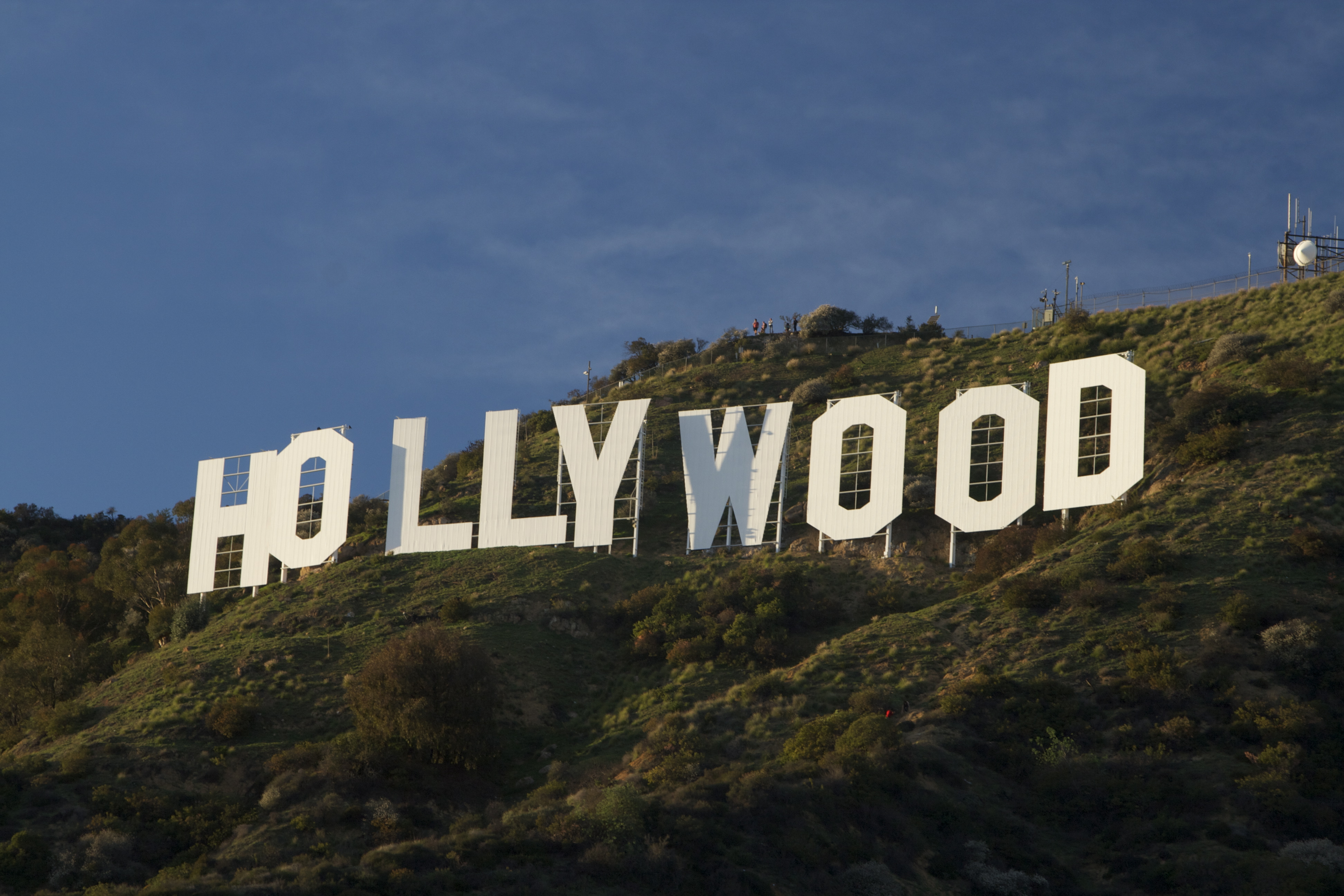
The Hollywood Sign

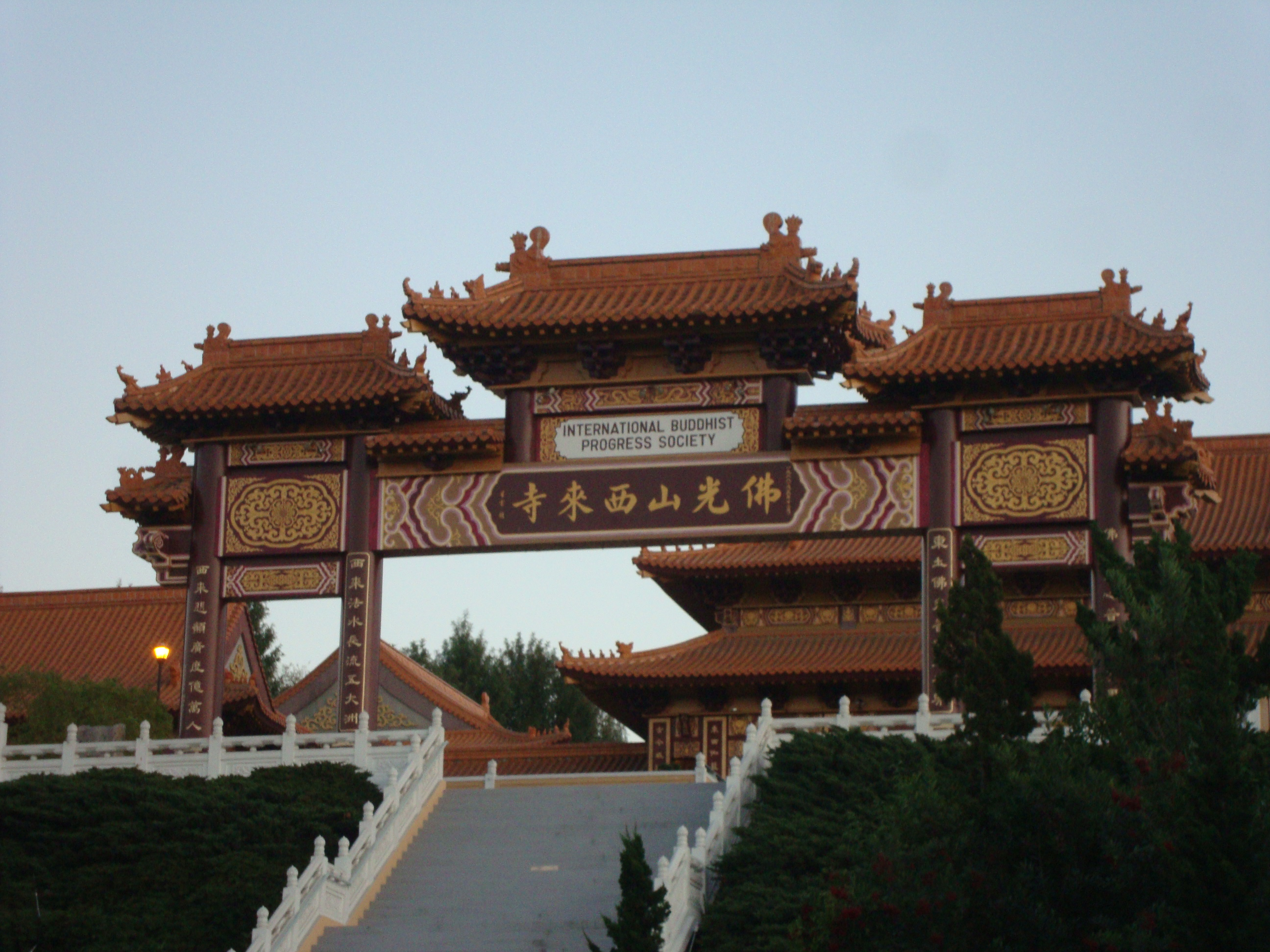
The Hsi Lai Temple

- The Haas Building
- Hale House
- Hammer Museum
- Hancock Park
- The Hat
- Heinsbergen Decorating Company Building
- Heritage Square Museum
- Highland Avenue palm trees
- Highland-Camrose Bungalow Village
- Highland Park
- Historic Filipinotown
- Holiday Bowl
- Hollenbeck Park
- Hollywood and Vine
- Hollywood Bowl (Hollywood)
- Hollywood Center Studios
- Hollywood Forever Cemetery
- Hollywood Heritage Museum
- Hollywood High School
- Hollywood Melrose Hotel
- Hollywood Museum
- Hollywood Post Office
- Hollywood Reservoir
- Hollywood Roosevelt Hotel
- Hollywood Sign
- Hollywood Walk of Fame (Hollywood)
- Holmes-Shannon House
- Hotel Alexandria
- Hotel Café
- Hotel Chancellor
- Hsi Lai Temple
- Huntington Library (San Marino)
- Hyde Park Congregational Church

== I ==
- Inglewood Park Cemetery
- Intuit Dome (Inglewood)

== J ==
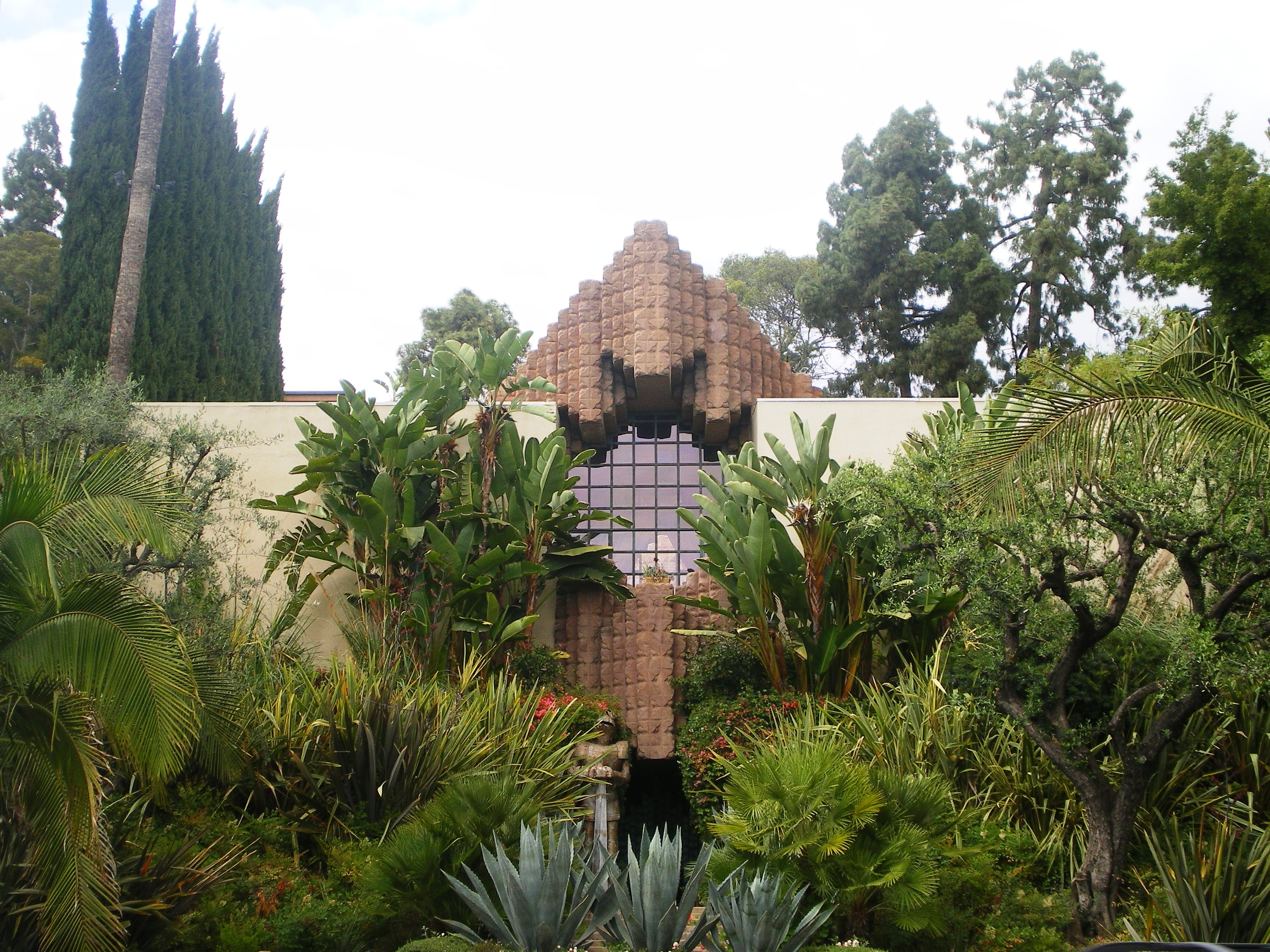
The John Sowden House

- Japanese American National Museum (Downtown)
- The Japanese Garden
- Jardinette Apartments
- Jet Propulsion Laboratory (Pasadena)
- Jewelry District
- John Sowden House
- Johnie's Coffee Shop
- Judson Studios
- Jumbo's Clown Room

== K ==
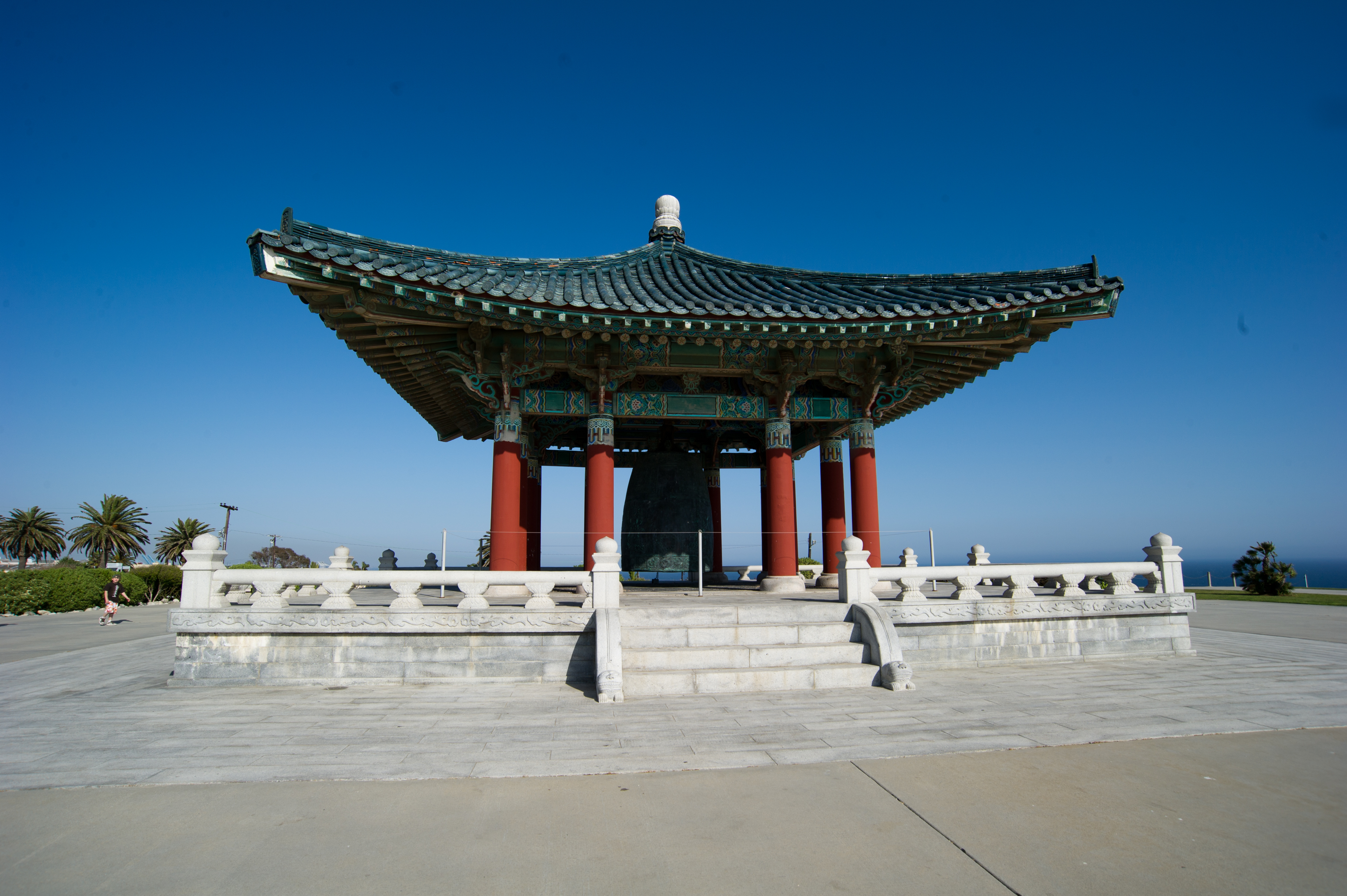
The Korean Bell of Friendship

- Kelton Apartments
- Knott's Berry Farm
- Korean Bell of Friendship
- Koreatown (near Mid-Center)
- Kronish House

== L ==
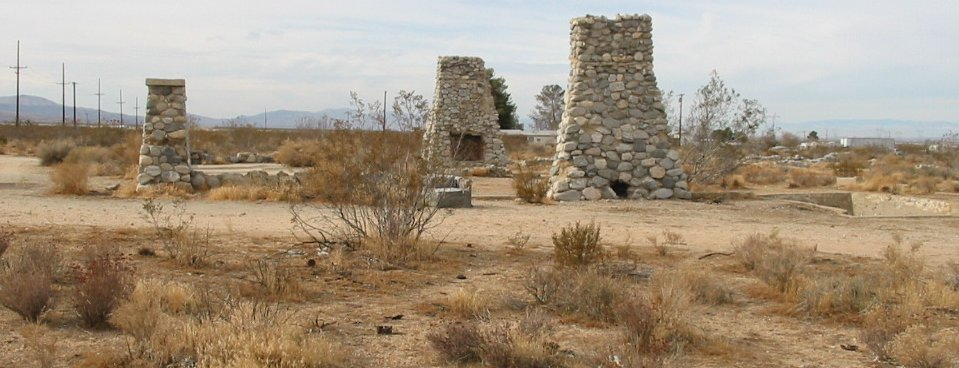
Ruins of Llano del Rio

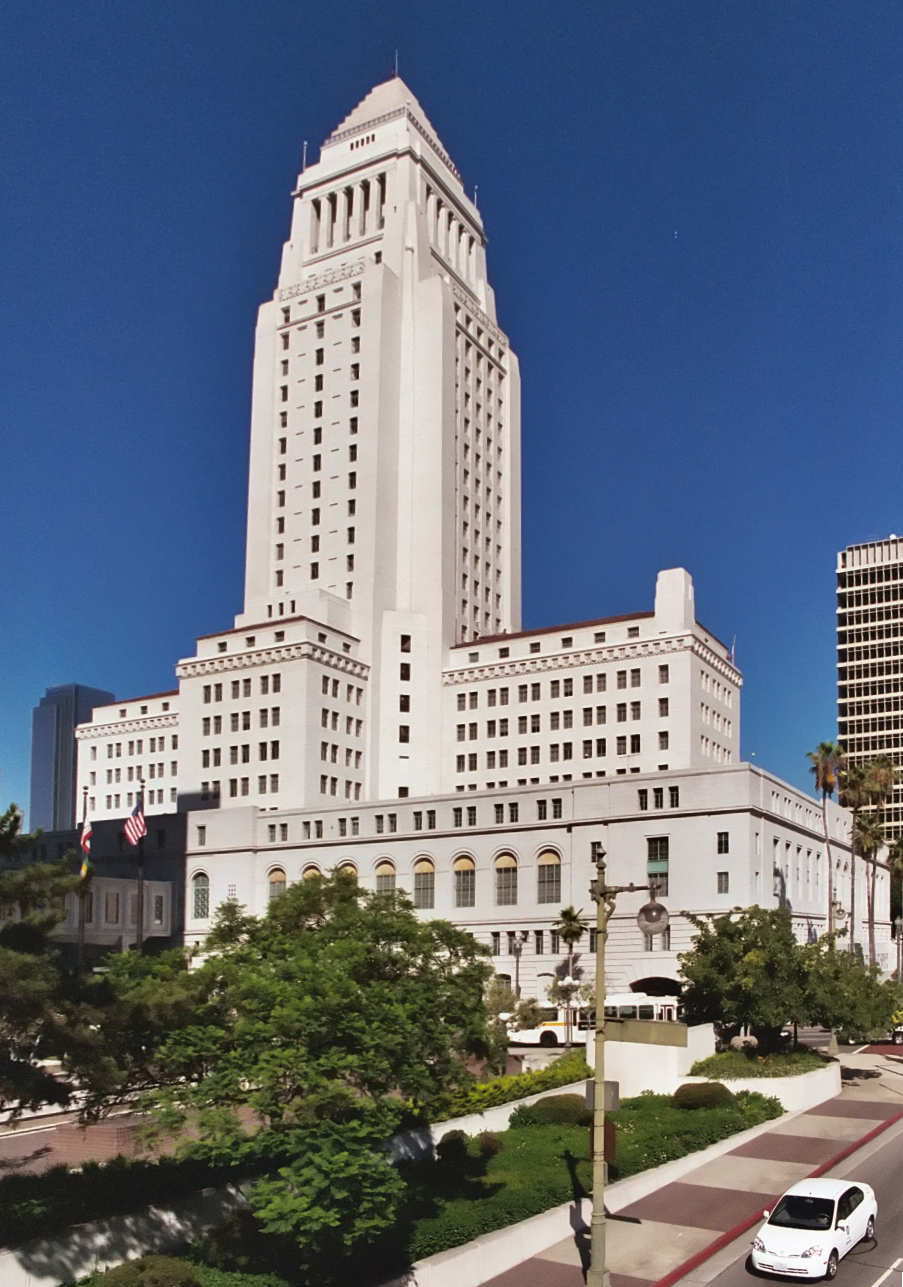
Los Angeles City Hall

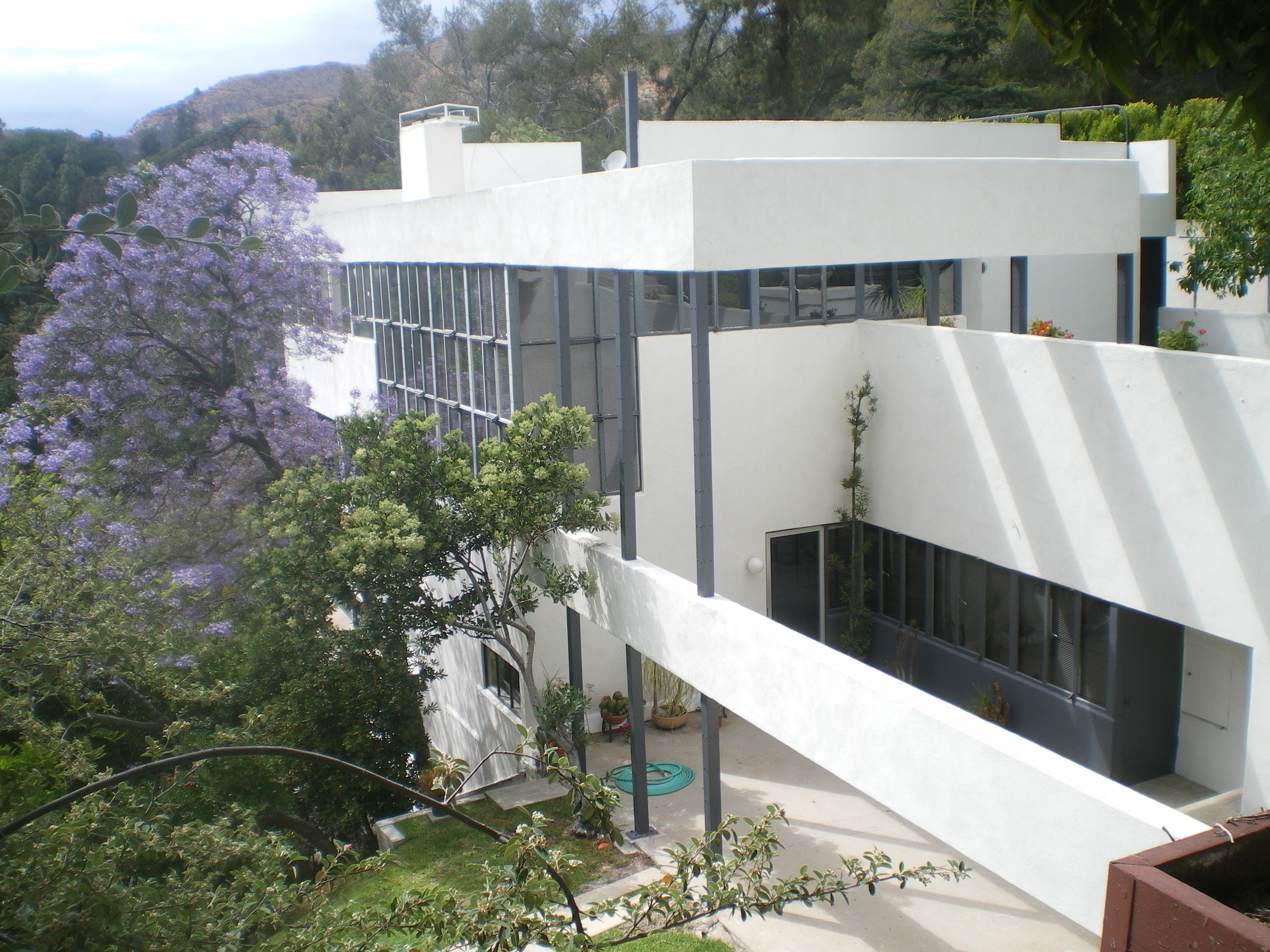
The Lovell House

- L.A. Live
- La Brea Tar Pits (Miracle Mile)
- Lafayette Park
- Landfair Apartments
- Lassen Street Olive Trees
- Laurel Canyon
- Leimert Park
- The Leo Magnus Cricket Complex
- Leonis Adobe
- Levitated Mass
- Lincoln Heights Branch Library
- Little Armenia
- Little Ethiopia
- Little India (Artesia)
- Little Tokyo (Downtown)
- Llano del Rio
- Long Beach main post office
- Long Beach Marine Institute
- Los Angeles Air Force Base
- Los Angeles Aqueduct
- Los Angeles Central Library
- Los Angeles City Hall (Downtown)
- Los Angeles Convention Center
- Los Angeles County Arboretum and Botanic Garden (Arcadia)
- Los Angeles County Coroner's Office
- Los Angeles County Museum of Art (LACMA) (Miracle Mile)
- Los Angeles Fire Department Museum and Memorial
- Los Angeles International Airport (LAX) (Westchester, Los Angeles)
- Los Angeles Memorial Coliseum (south of Downtown)
- Los Angeles Nurses' Club
- Los Angeles River bicycle path
- Los Angeles State Historic Park
- Los Angeles Zoo (Griffith Park)
- Los Encinos State Historic Park
- Lovell House
- Lummis House
- Lydecker House

== M ==
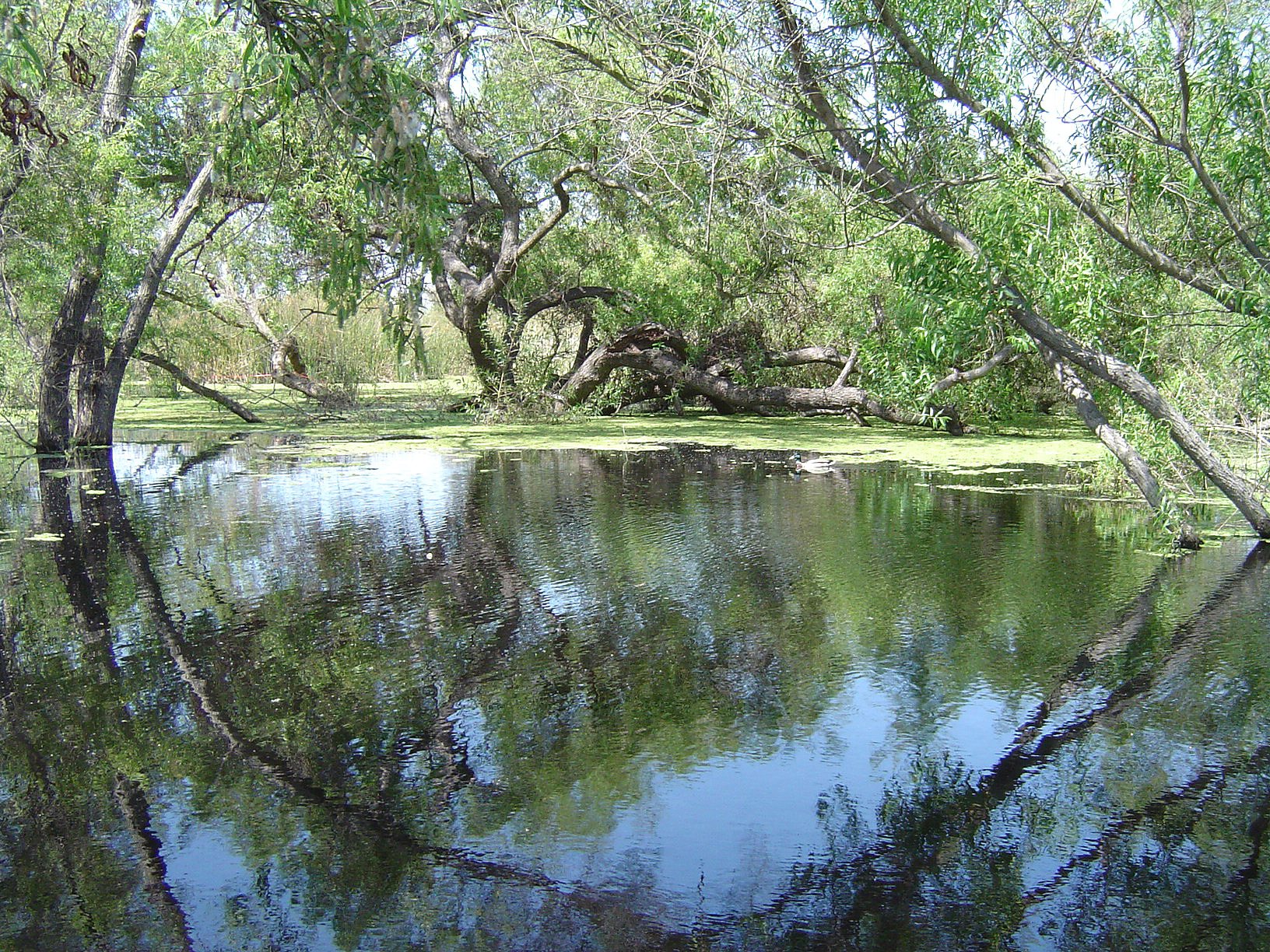
Madrona Marsh

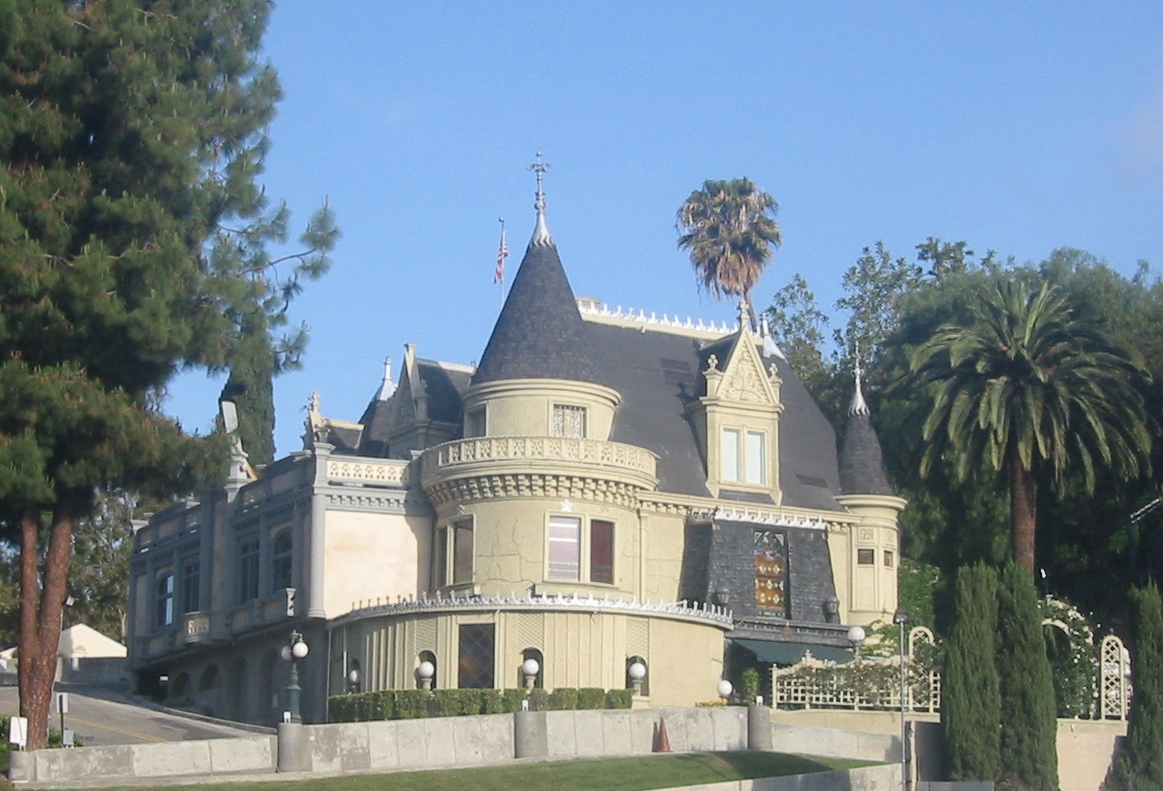
The Magic Castle

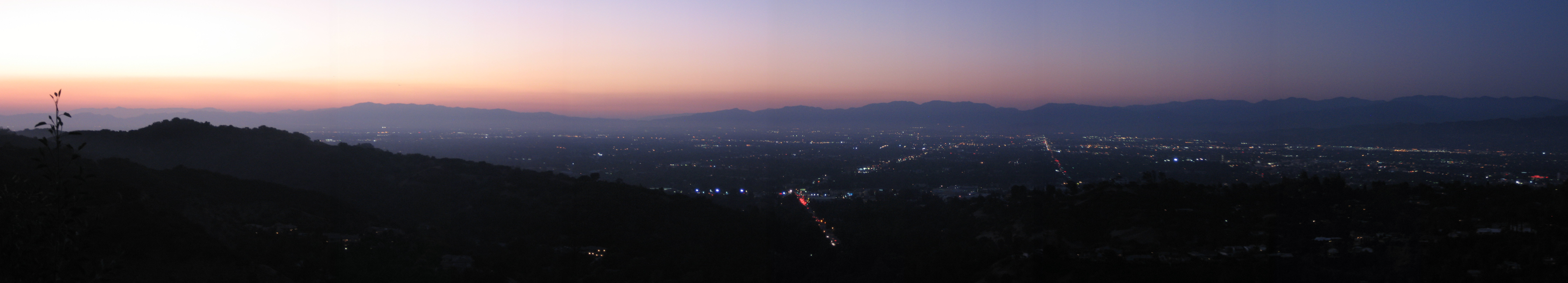
View from Mulholland Drive

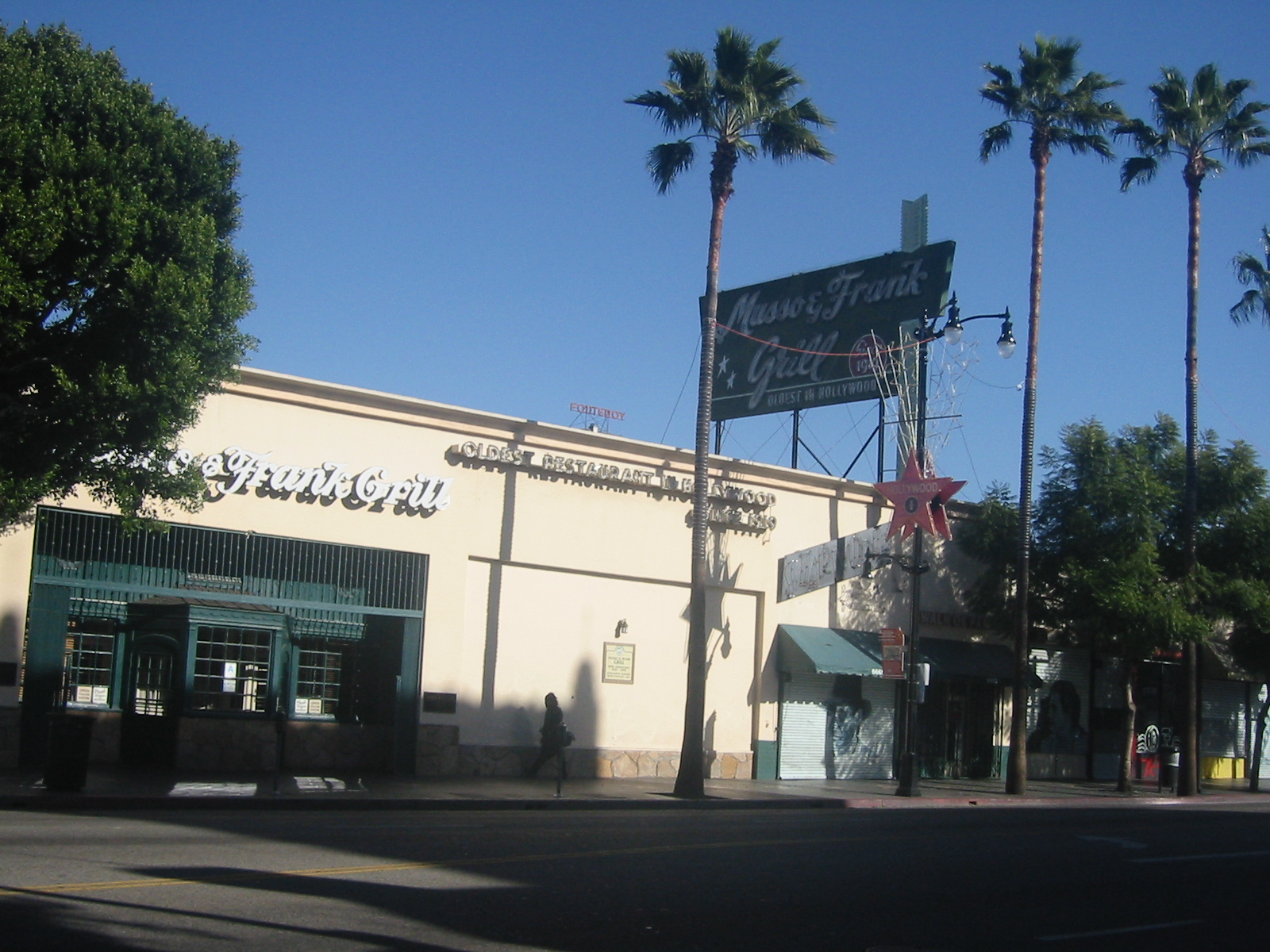
Musso & Frank Grill

- Macarthur Park (Westlake)
- Machine Project
- Madrona Marsh
- The Magic Castle
- Malibou Lake
- Malibu Creek
- Malibu Lagoon State Beach
- Mariachi Plaza
- Marina del Rey
- Mark Taper Forum
- Marvin Braude Mulholland Gateway Park
- Mary Andrews Clark Memorial Home
- Mayan Theater
- Memorial Branch
- Mildred E. Mathias Botanical Garden
- Minnie Hill Palmer House
- Miracle Mile (West of Downtown, Wilshire Boulevard)
- Mission San Fernando Rey de España
- Mission San Gabriel Arcángel
- Mitsuwa Marketplace
- Mount Wilson Observatory
- Mulholland Drive
- Mulholland Highway
- Municipal Warehouse No. 1
- Museum of Contemporary Art
- Museum of Jurassic Technology
- Museum of Tolerance (West Los Angeles)
- Music Center
- Musso & Frank Grill

== N ==
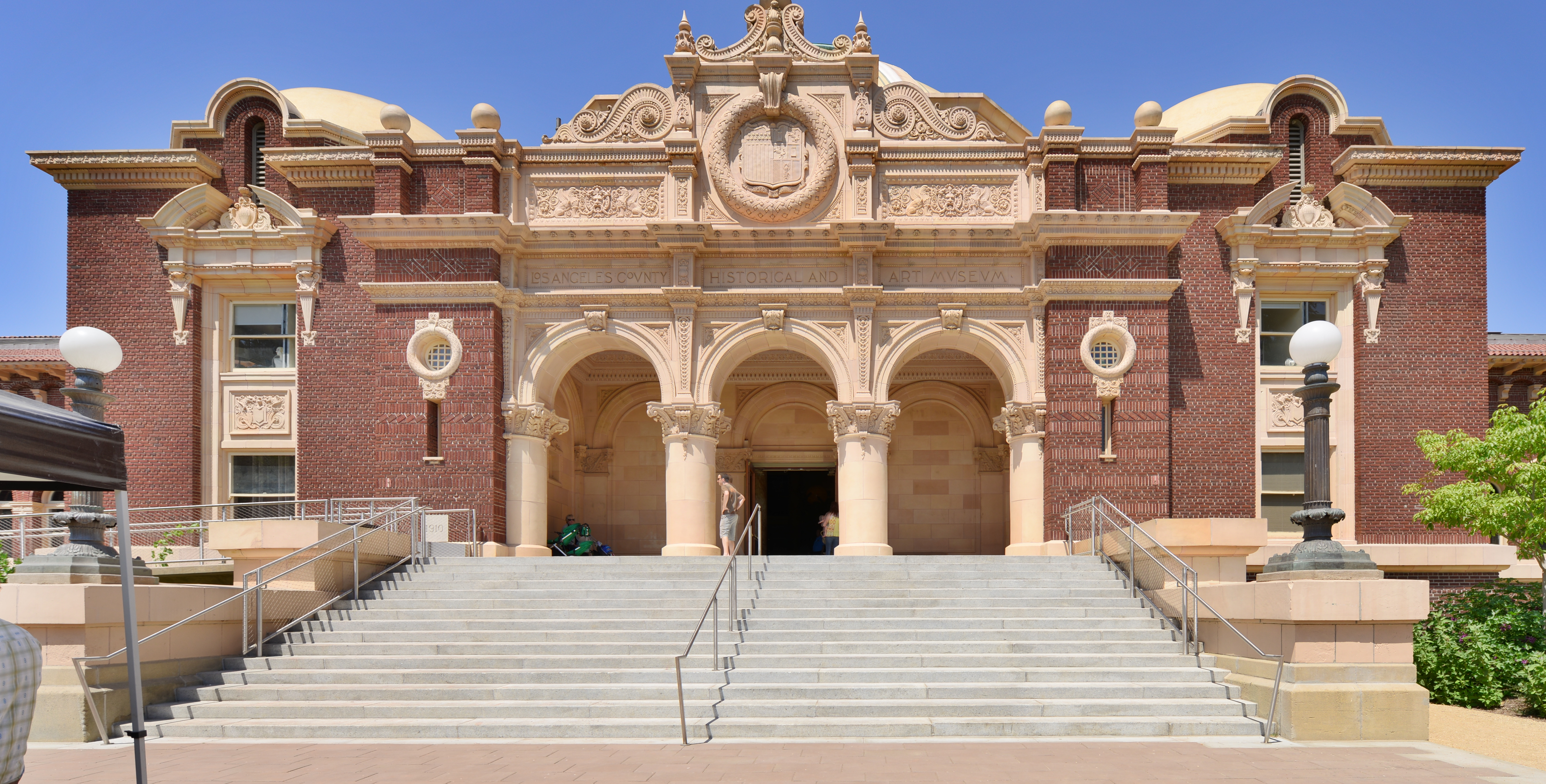
Los Angeles County Natural History Museum

- Natural History Museum of Los Angeles County
- Nethercutt Collection
- Neutra Office Building
- NoHo Arts District
- Norms Restaurants
- Norton Simon Museum
- Nuart Theatre

== O ==
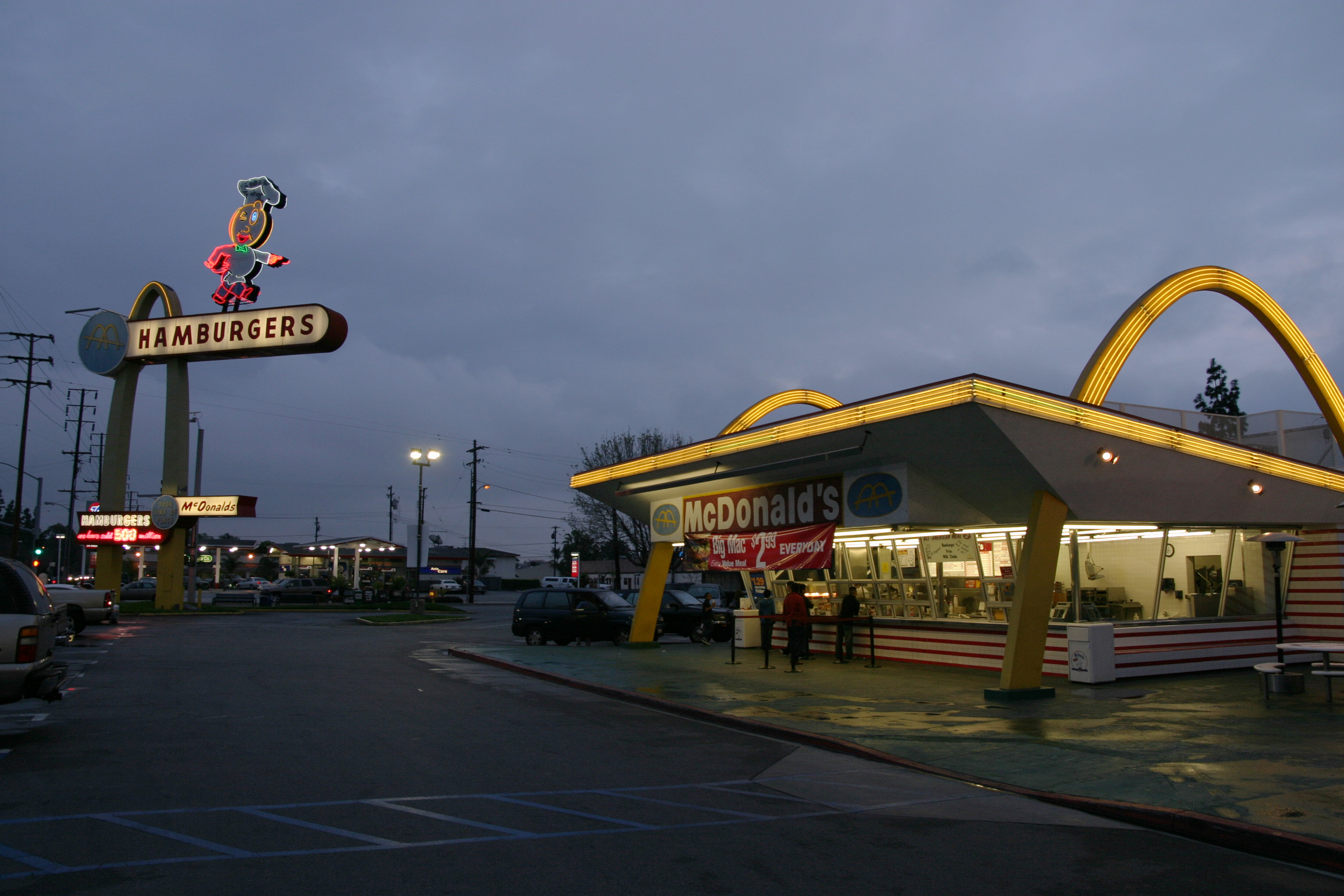
The oldest McDonald's restaurant

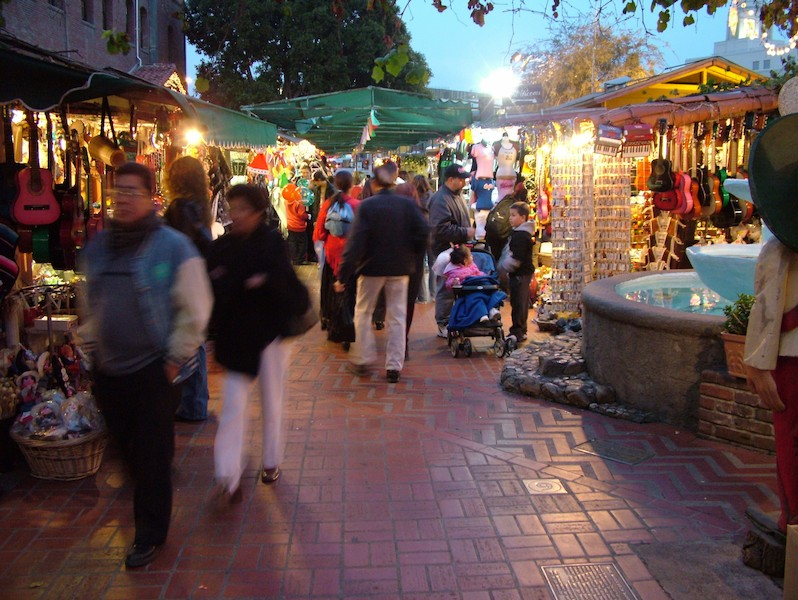
Olvera Street

- Odd Fellows Cemetery
- Old Bank District
- Old Plaza Firehouse
- Old Santa Susana Stage Road
- Old Town Pasadena
- Old Warner Brothers Studio
- Oldest McDonald's restaurant (Downey)
- Olvera Street (Downtown)
- O'Melveny Park
- Open Fist Theatre Company
- Orcutt Ranch Horticulture Center
- Ovation Hollywood
- Original Tommy's
- Orpheum Theatre
- Owlwood Estate

== P ==
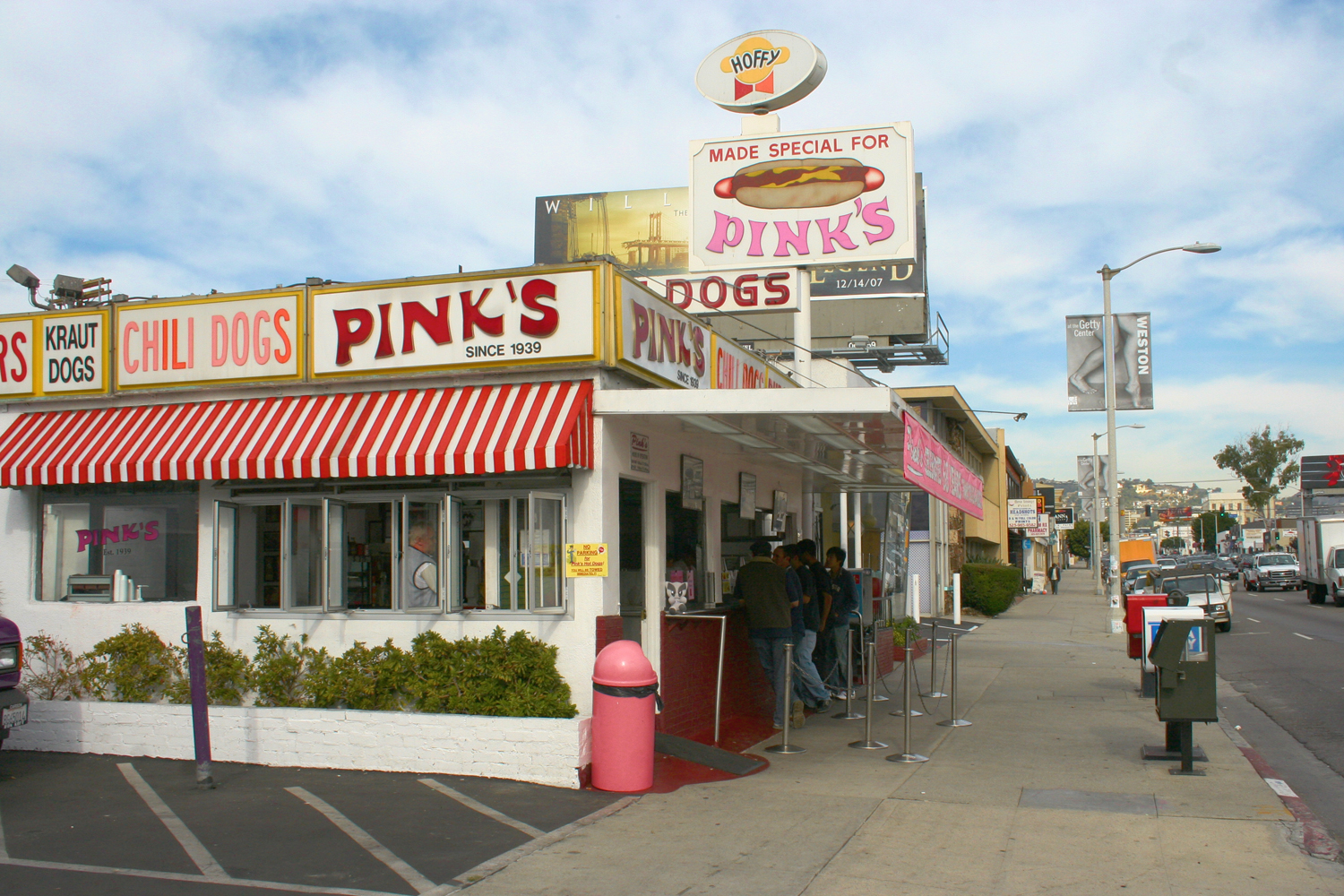
Pink's Hot Dogs

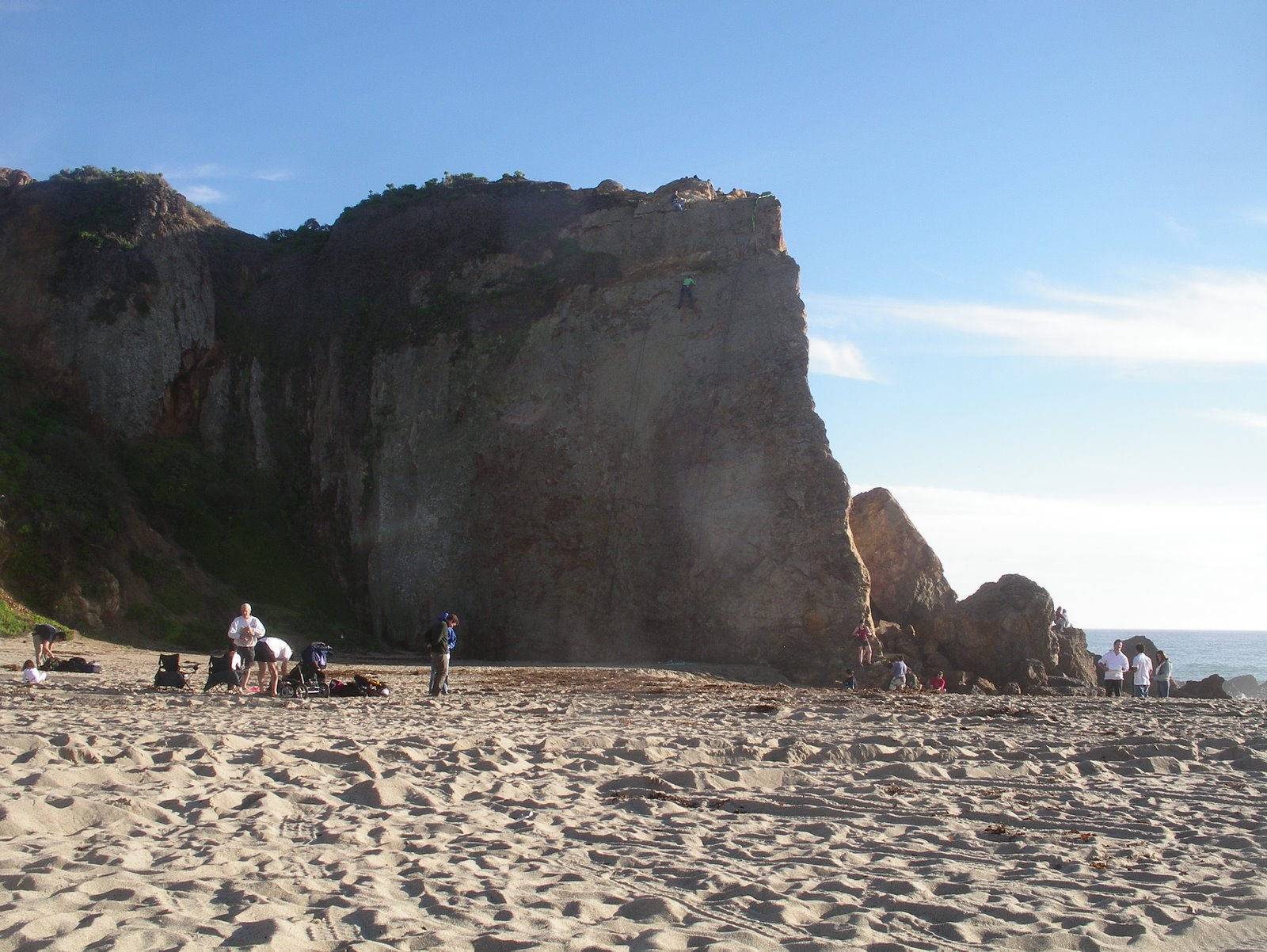
Point Dume

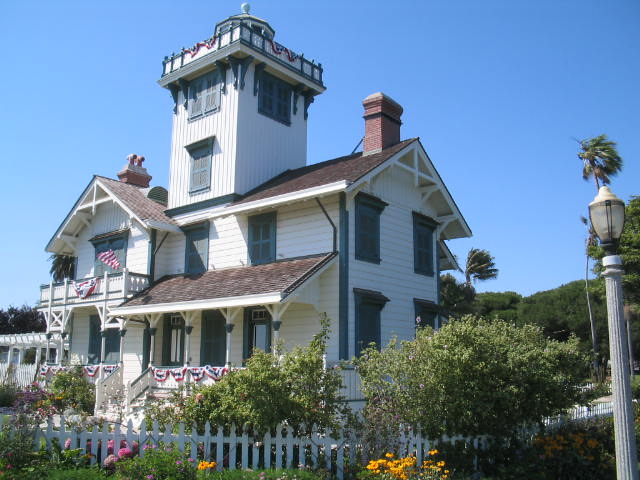
Point Fermin Light

- Pacific Asia Museum (Pasadena)
- Pacific Design Center
- Pacific Electric Railroad Bridge (Torrance)
- Pacoima Dam
- Pann's
- Pantages Theatre
- The Pantry
- Paradox Iron Brewery
- Paramount Studios
- Park Plaza Hotel
- Pasadena Museum of California Art
- Pasadena Museum of History
- Pasadena Playhouse
- Peck Park
- Pellissier Building
- Pershing Square
- Petersen Automotive Museum (Miracle Mile, Los Angeles)
- Petitfils-Boos House
- Philippe's
- Pink's Hot Dogs
- Pio Pico State Historic Park
- Playa del Rey
- Playboy Mansion
- Plummer Park
- Point Dume
- Point Fermin Light
- Point Mugu State Park
- Pomona Envisions the Future
- Port of Los Angeles
- Portal of the Folded Wings Shrine to Aviation

== R ==
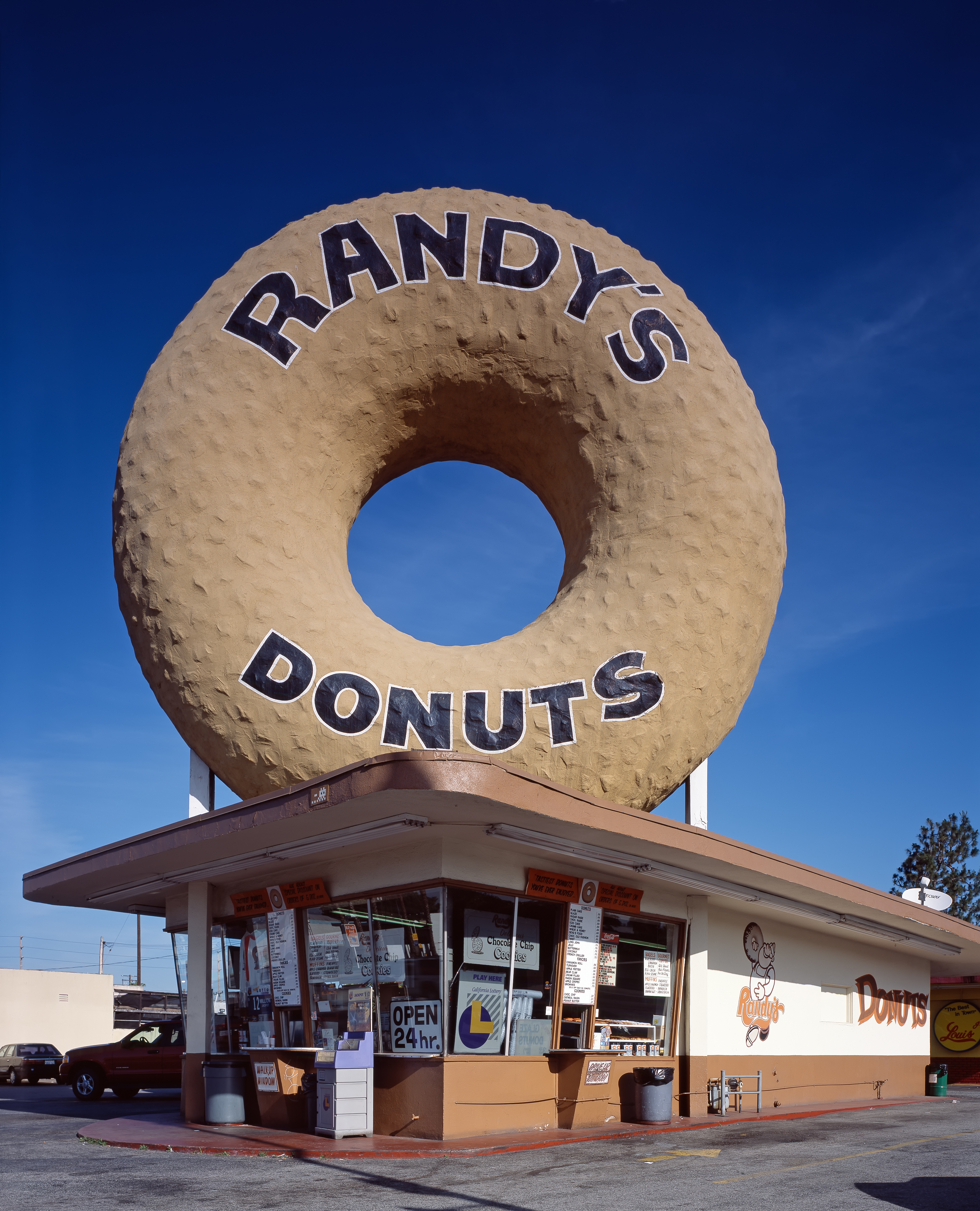
Randy's Donuts

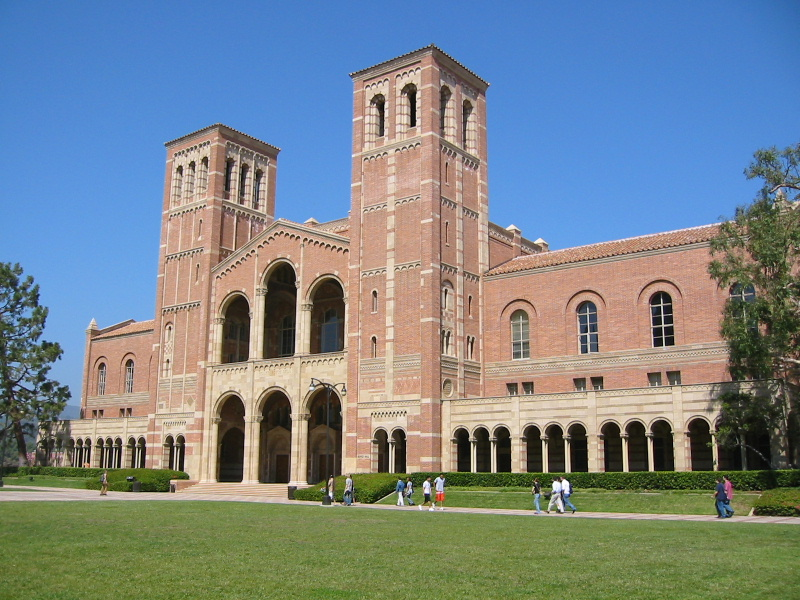
Royce Hall, UCLA

- RMS Queen Mary (Long Beach)
- Rainbow Bar and Grill
- Ralph J. Bunche House
- Ralph J. Scott (fireboat)
- Randy's Donuts (Inglewood)
- RAT Beach
- The Ravenswood
- Red Men Hall
- Ren-Mar Studios
- Rindge House
- Rio de Los Angeles State Park
- Robert Morton Organ Company
- The Rock Store
- Rocky Peak
- Rodeo Drive (Beverly Hills)
- Rodeo Drive Walk of Style
- Roosevelt Building
- Roscoe's House of Chicken and Waffles
- Rose Bowl
- The Roxy Theatre
- Royce Hall
- Runyon Canyon Park

== S ==
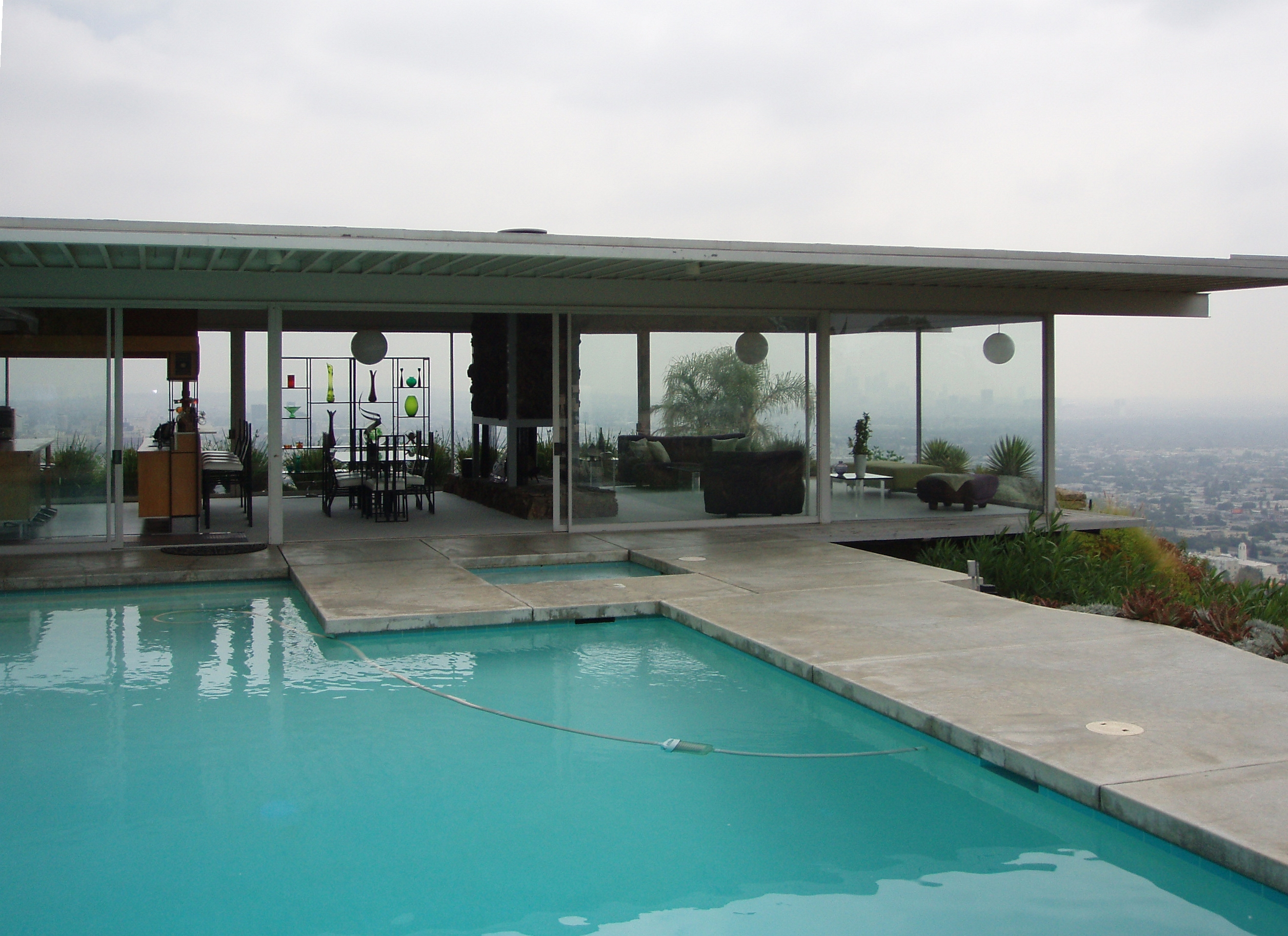
Stahl House

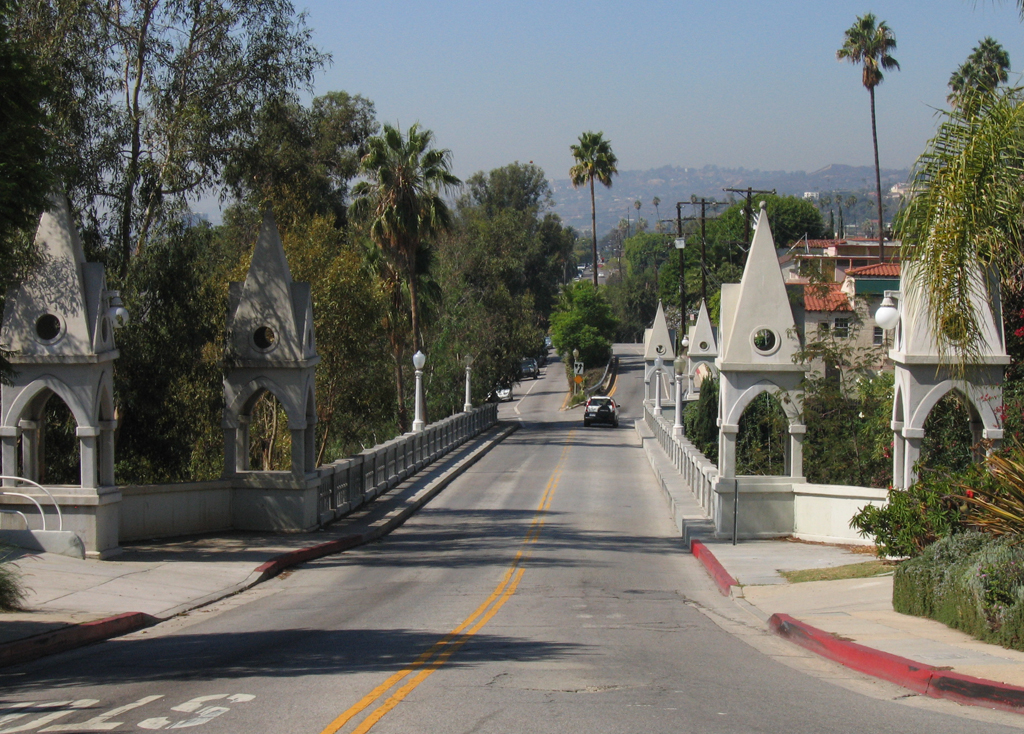
The Shakespeare Bridge

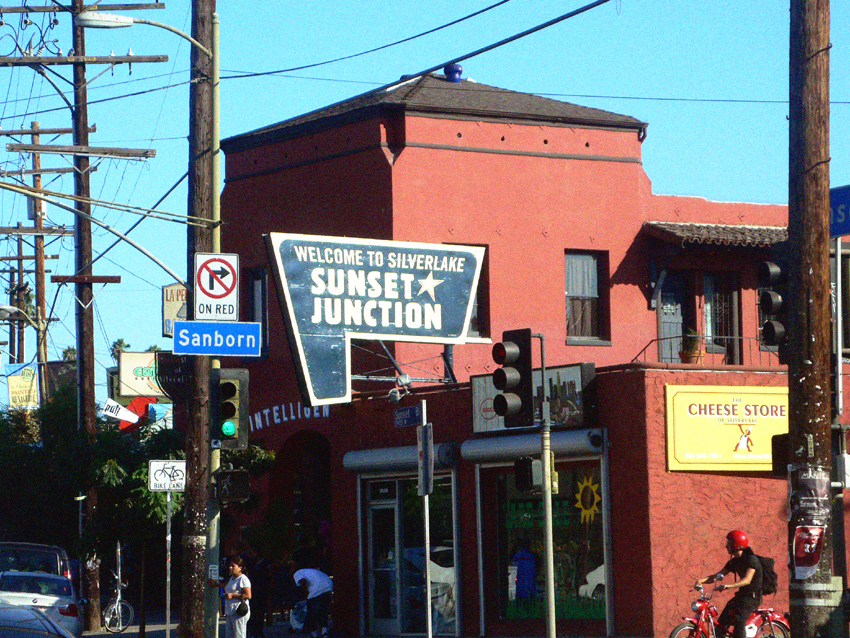
Sunset Junction

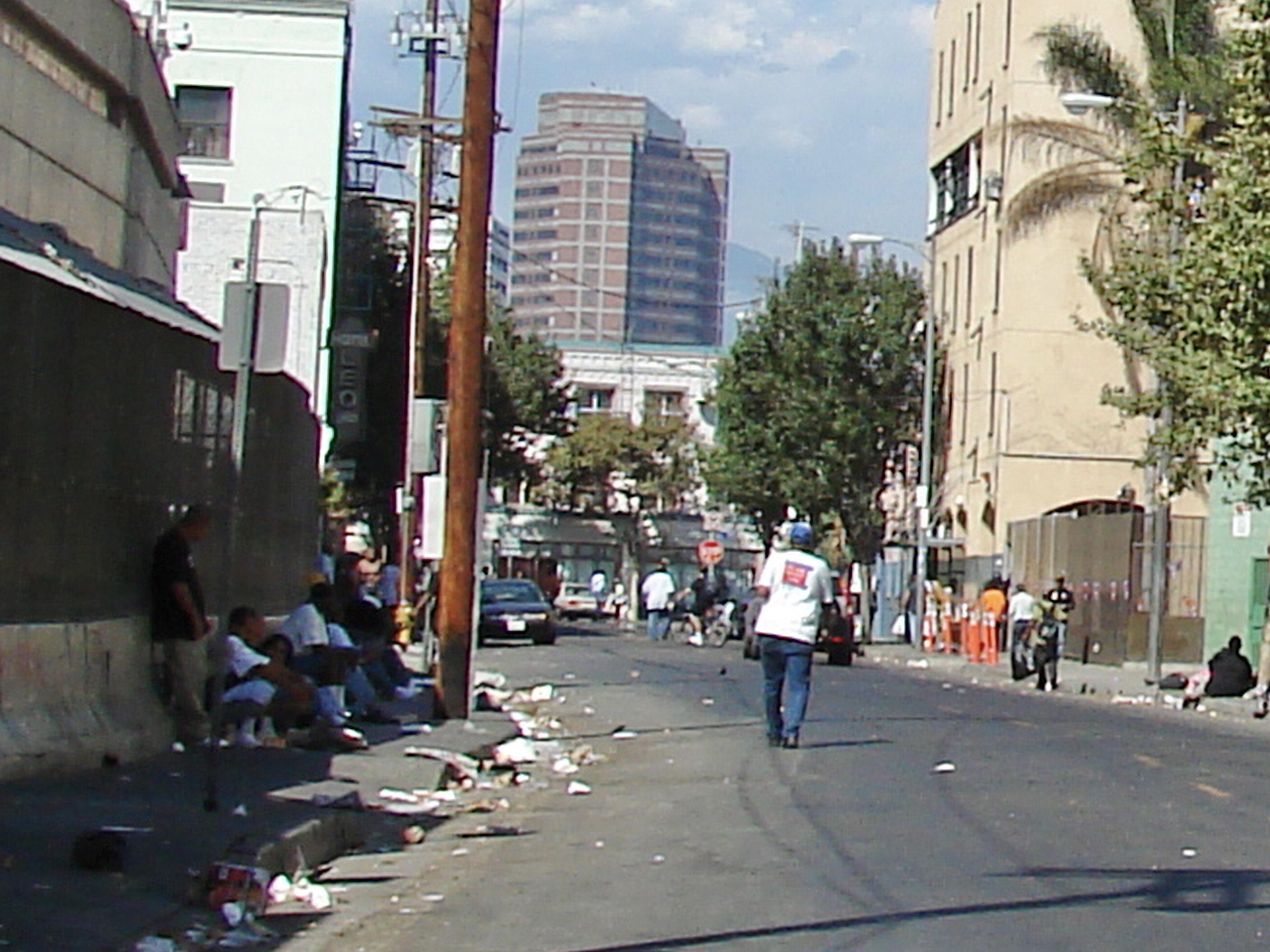
Skid Row, Los Angeles

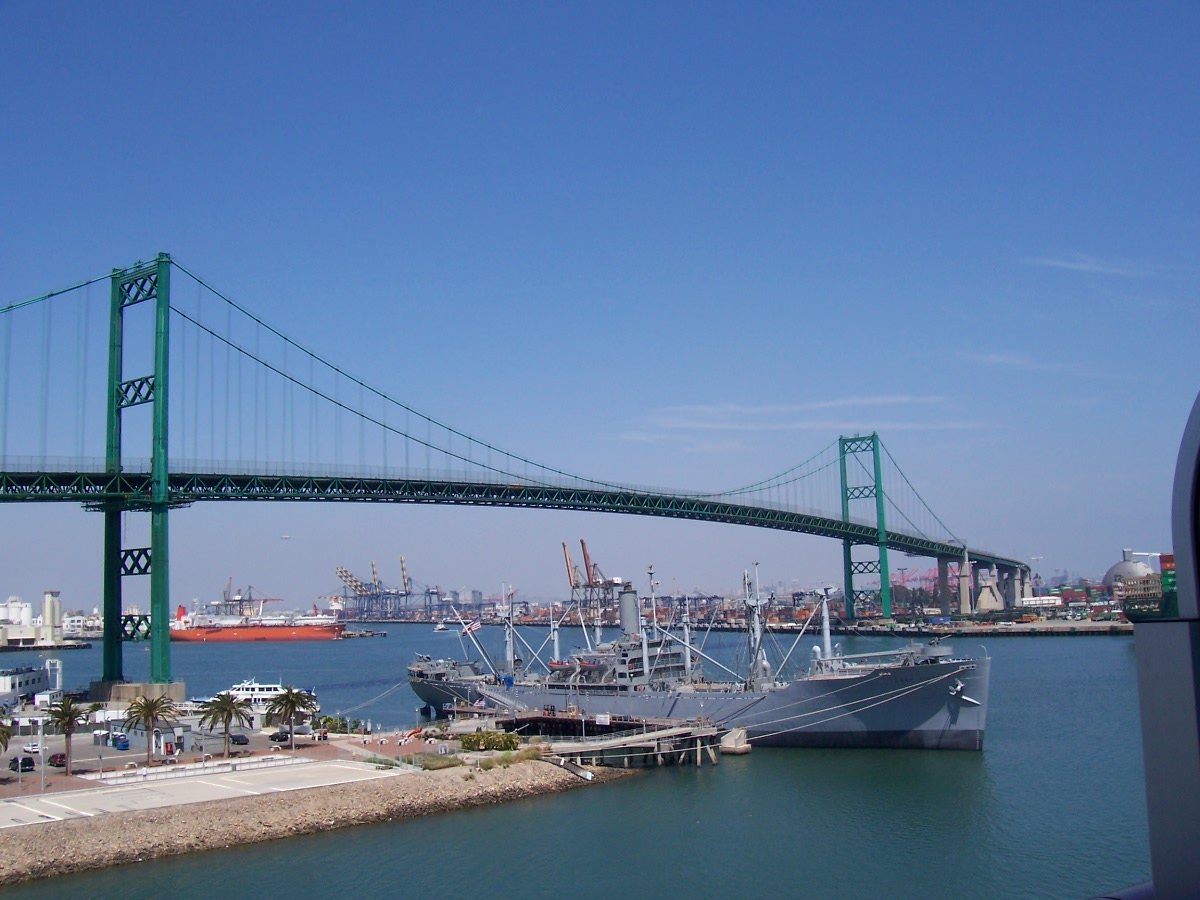
SS Lane Victory by Vincent Thomas Bridge

- St. Andrews Bungalow Court
- St. Vincent de Paul Church
- Salazar Park
- Samuel Freeman House
- San Fernando Building
- San Fernando Mission Cemetery
- San Fernando Pioneer Memorial Cemetery
- San Pedro Municipal Ferry Building
- San Pedro post office
- Santa Anita Dam
- Santa Anita Park
- Santa Catalina Island
- Santa Fe Springs Swap Meet
- Santa Monica Looff Hippodrome
- Santa Monica Pier (Santa Monica)
- Santa Monica State Beach
- Santa Susana Field Laboratory
- Sears, Roebuck Building
- Second Church of Christ, Scientist
- Security Trust and Savings
- Self Help Graphics & Art
- Self-Realization Fellowship Lake Shrine
- Sepulveda Dam
- Sepulveda Pass
- Shakespeare Bridge
- Sheats Goldstein Residence
- Ships Coffee Shop
- Shrine Auditorium
- Silver Lake Reservoir
- Sinai Temple
- Six Flags Magic Mountain
- Skid Row
- Smith Estate
- SoFi Stadium (Inglewood)
- Sound City Studios
- South Park Lofts
- Sony Pictures Studios (Culver City)
- Southern California Gas Company Complex
- Southwest Museum
- SS Lane Victory
- Stahl House
- Staples Center (Downtown)
- Stephen S. Wise Temple
- Stoney Point (Chatsworth)
- Strathmore Apartments
- Streetcar Depot, West Los Angeles
- Sunset Junction
- Sunset Strip
- Sunset Tower
- Susana Machado Bernard House and Barn

== T ==
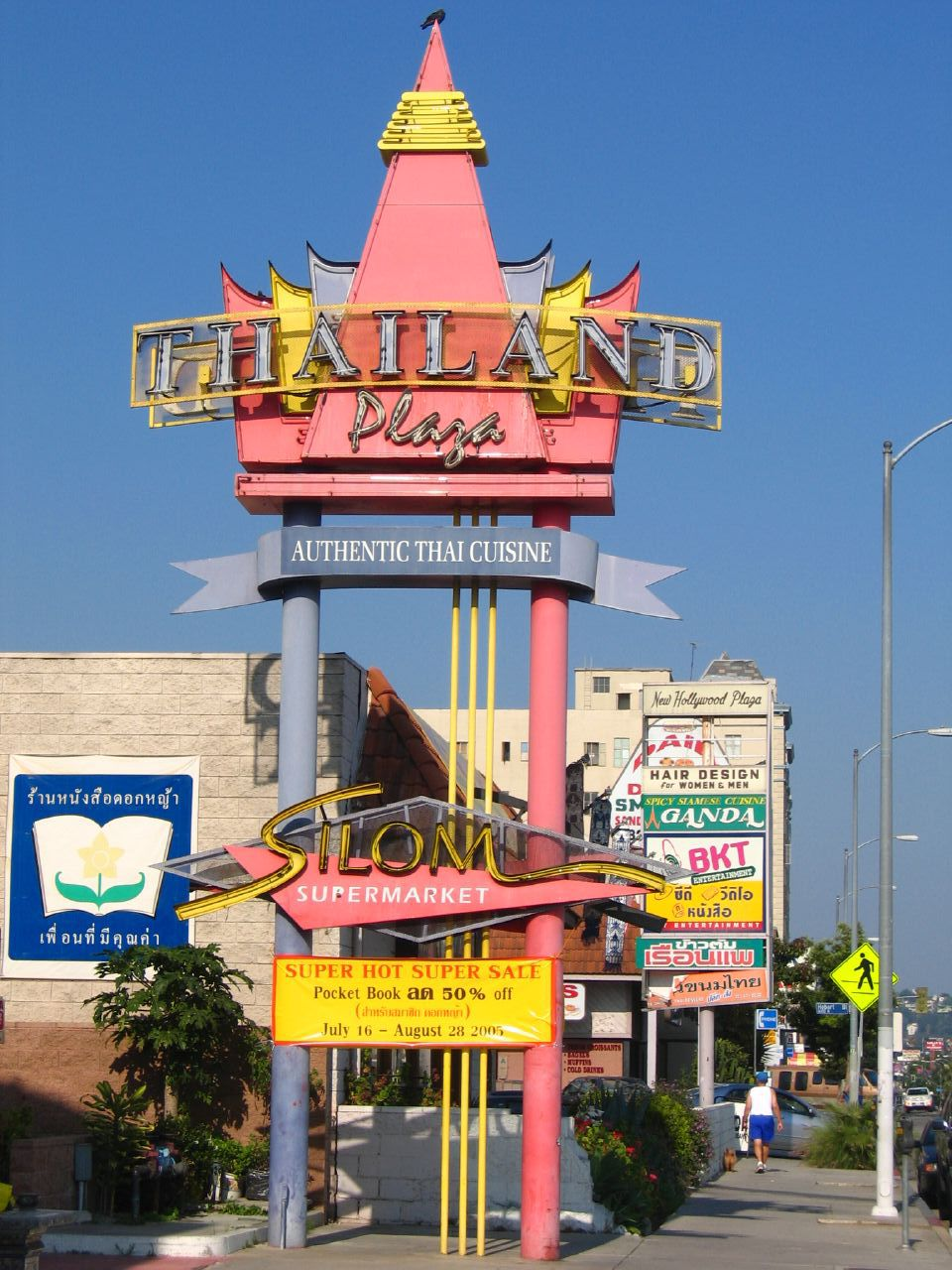
Thailand Plaza, Thai Town

- Tam O'Shanter Inn
- Television City
- Temple Beth Israel (Highland Park)
- Terminal Annex
- Thai Town (Hollywood)
- Theatre Row Hollywood
- Theme Building (at LAX)
- Theodore Payne Foundation
- Thien Hau Temple (Chinatown)
- Third Street Promenade (Santa Monica)
- Tiffany Theater
- Tiki Ti
- Tillman Water Reclamation Plant
- Title Guarantee and Trust Company Building
- Tom Bergin's
- Topanga Canyon
- Tower of Wooden Pallets
- The Town House
- Toy District
- Travel Town Museum (Griffith Park)
- Triforium
- The Troubadour

== U ==
- Union Station (Downtown)
- Universal CityWalk
- Universal Studios (Universal City)
- University of California, Los Angeles (UCLA)
- University of Southern California (USC)
- Upper Las Virgenes Canyon Open Space Preserve
- Urban Light
- U.S. Bank Tower (Downtown)
- USS Iowa Museum (San Pedro/Port of Los Angeles)

== V ==
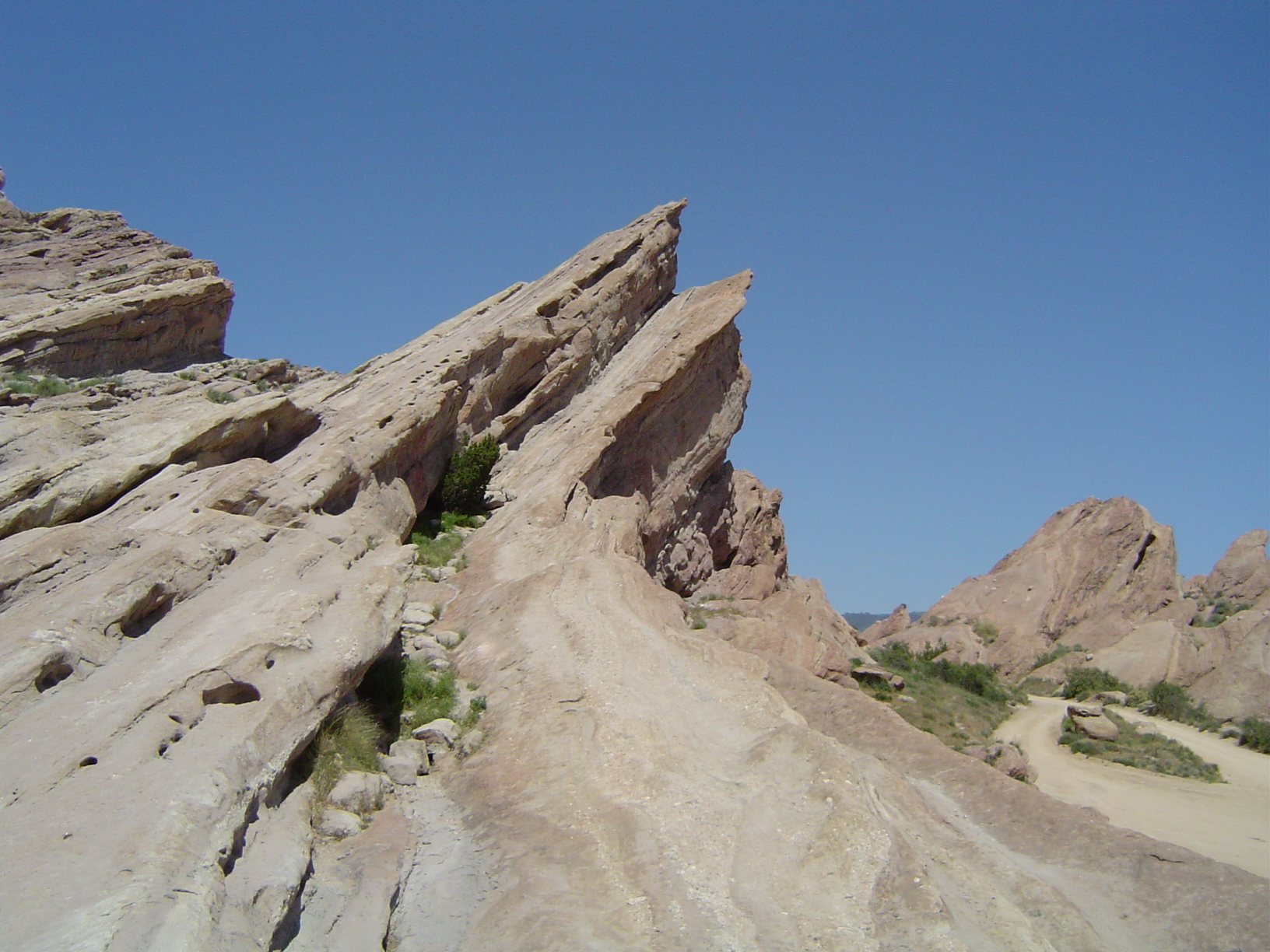
Vasquez Rocks

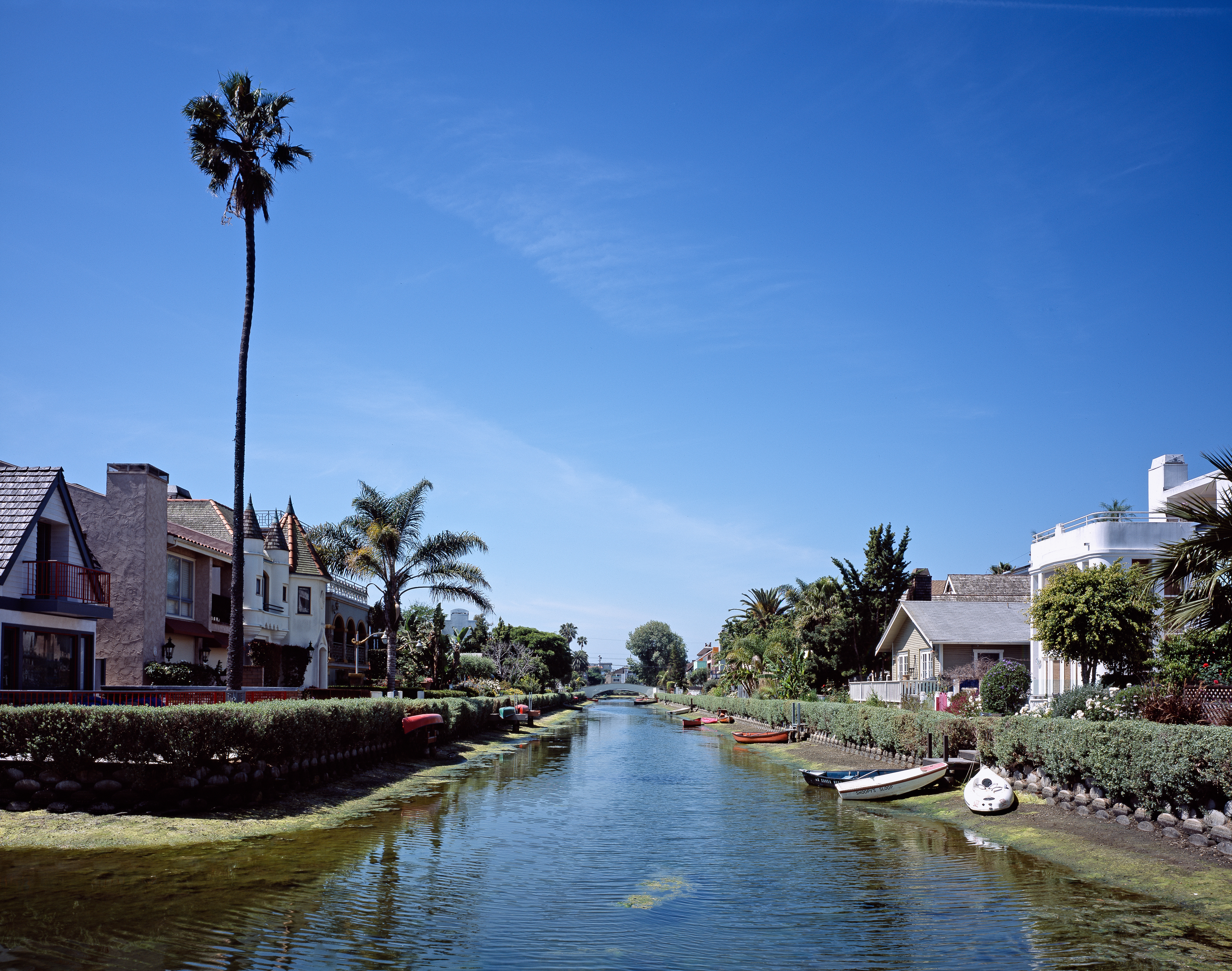
Venice Canals

- Van de Kamp Bakery Building
- Van Nuys Branch of the Los Angeles Public Library
- Vasquez Rocks
- Venice Beach boardwalk
- Venice Branch Library
- Venice canals
- Venice of America House
- Verdugo Hills Cemetery
- Villa Bonita
- Vincent Thomas Bridge
- The Viper Room
- Vista Theatre
- Vroman's Bookstore (Pasadena)

== W ==
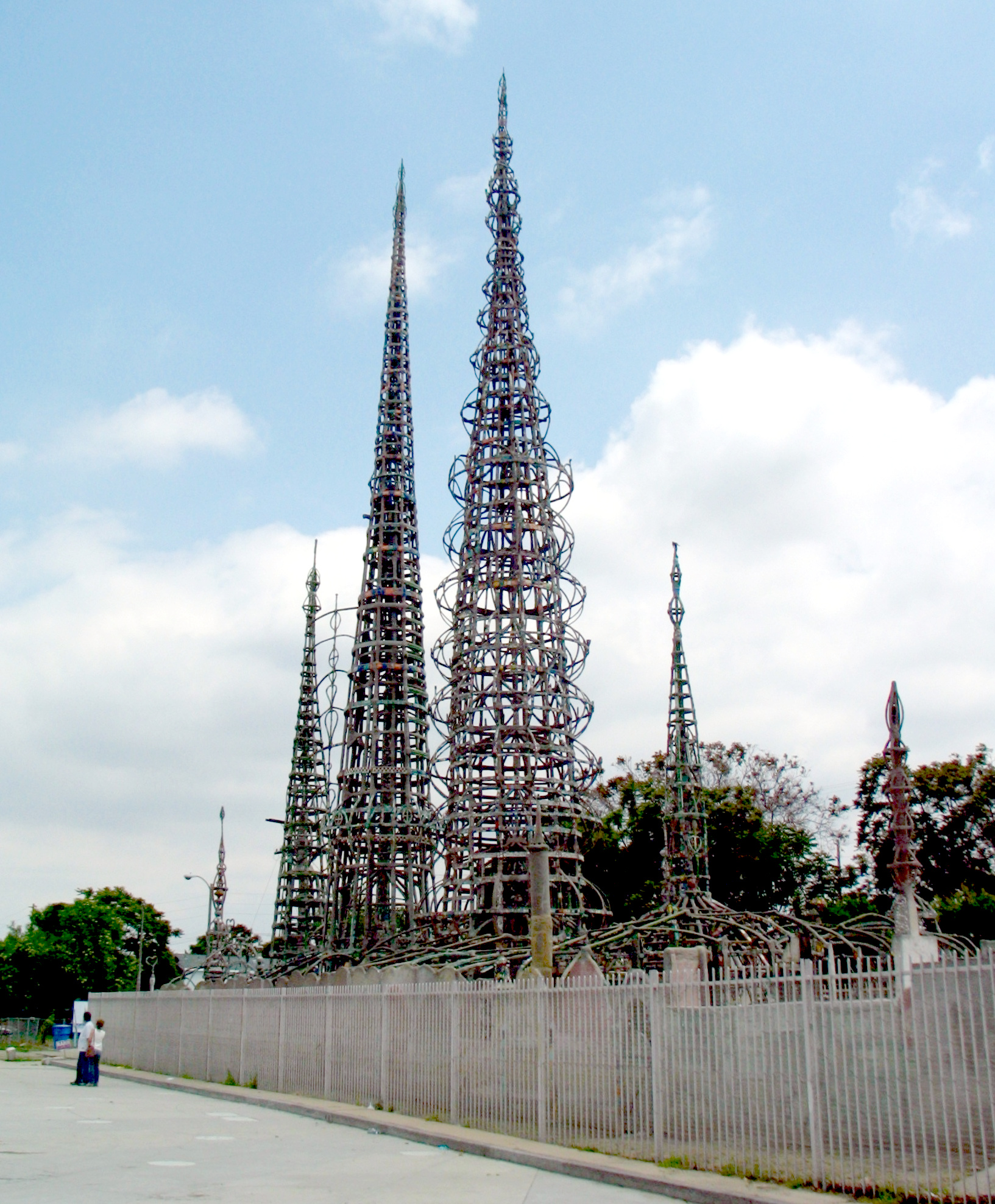
The Watts Towers

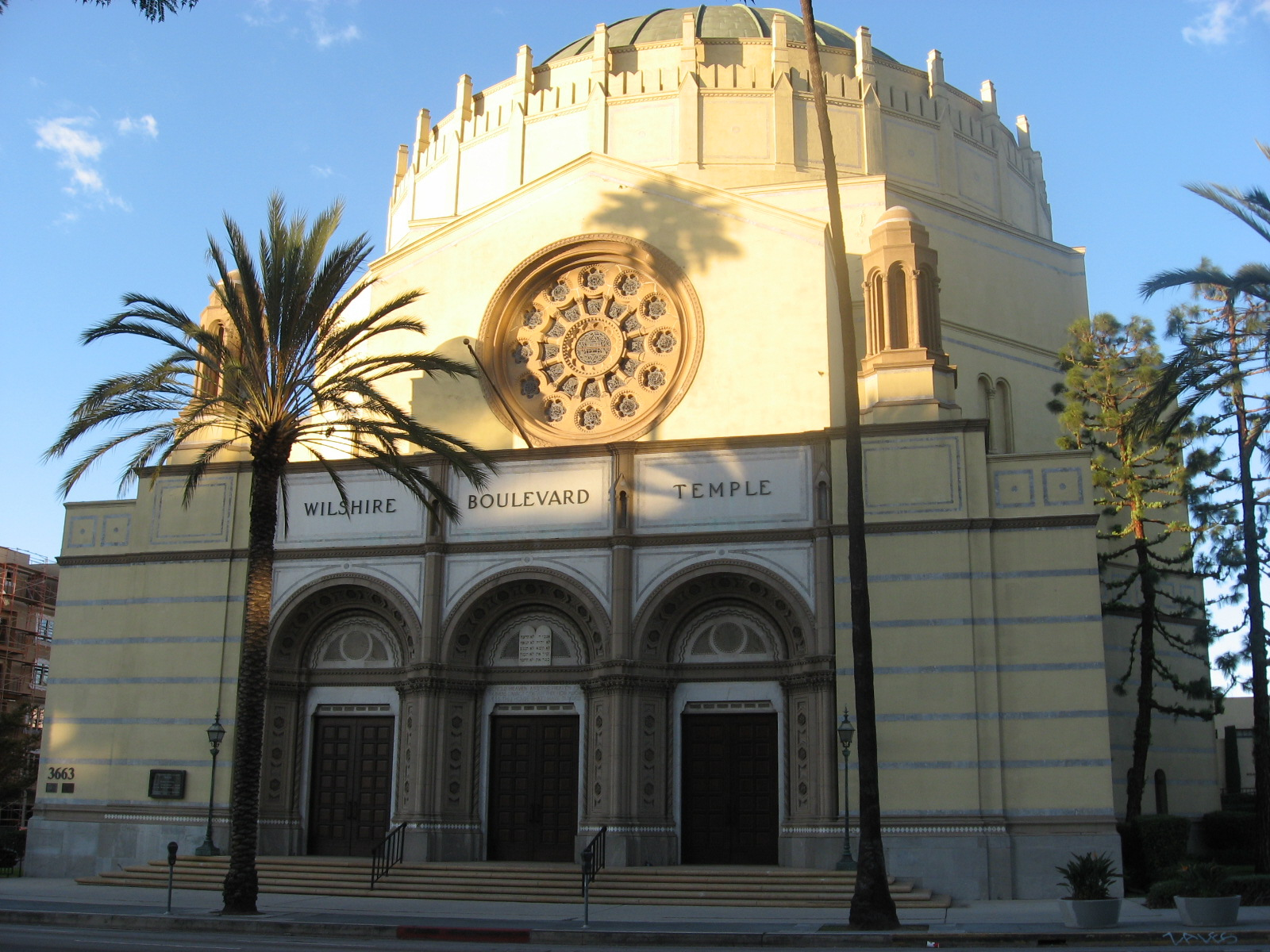
The Wilshire Boulevard Temple

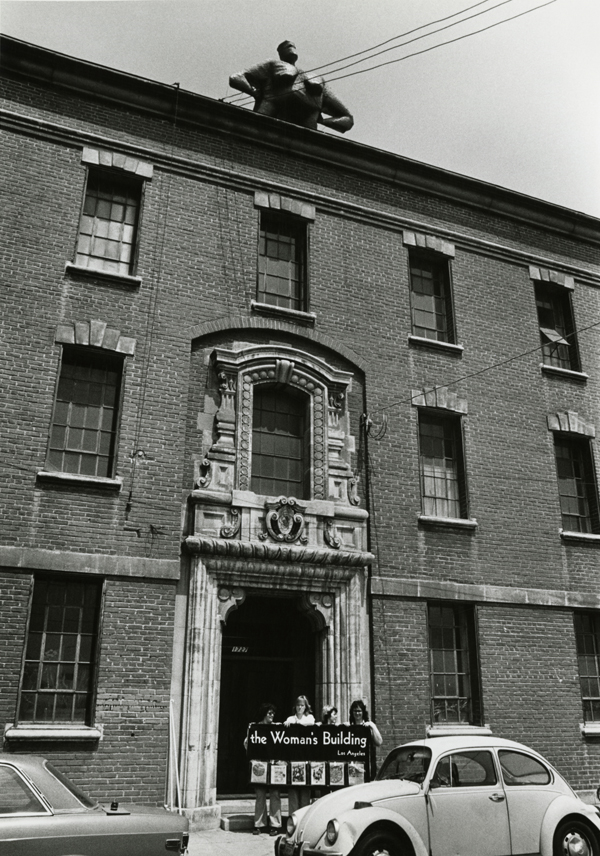
The Woman's Building

- Walt Disney Concert Hall
- Warner Center (Woodland Hills)
- Warren Wilson Beach House
- Watts Station
- Watts Towers
- Wells Fargo Center
- Westlake Theatre
- Westwood Village Memorial Park Cemetery
- Whisky a Go Go
- Whitley Heights
- Whittier Narrows
- Wilkins House
- Will Rogers State Beach
- Will Rogers State Historic Park
- Wilmington Branch
- Wilshire Boulevard Temple
- Wilshire Branch
- Wilshire Federal Building
- Wilshire Ward Chapel
- Wiltern Theatre
- Woman's Building
- Woodley Park

== Y ==
- Young's Market Company Building

== Z ==
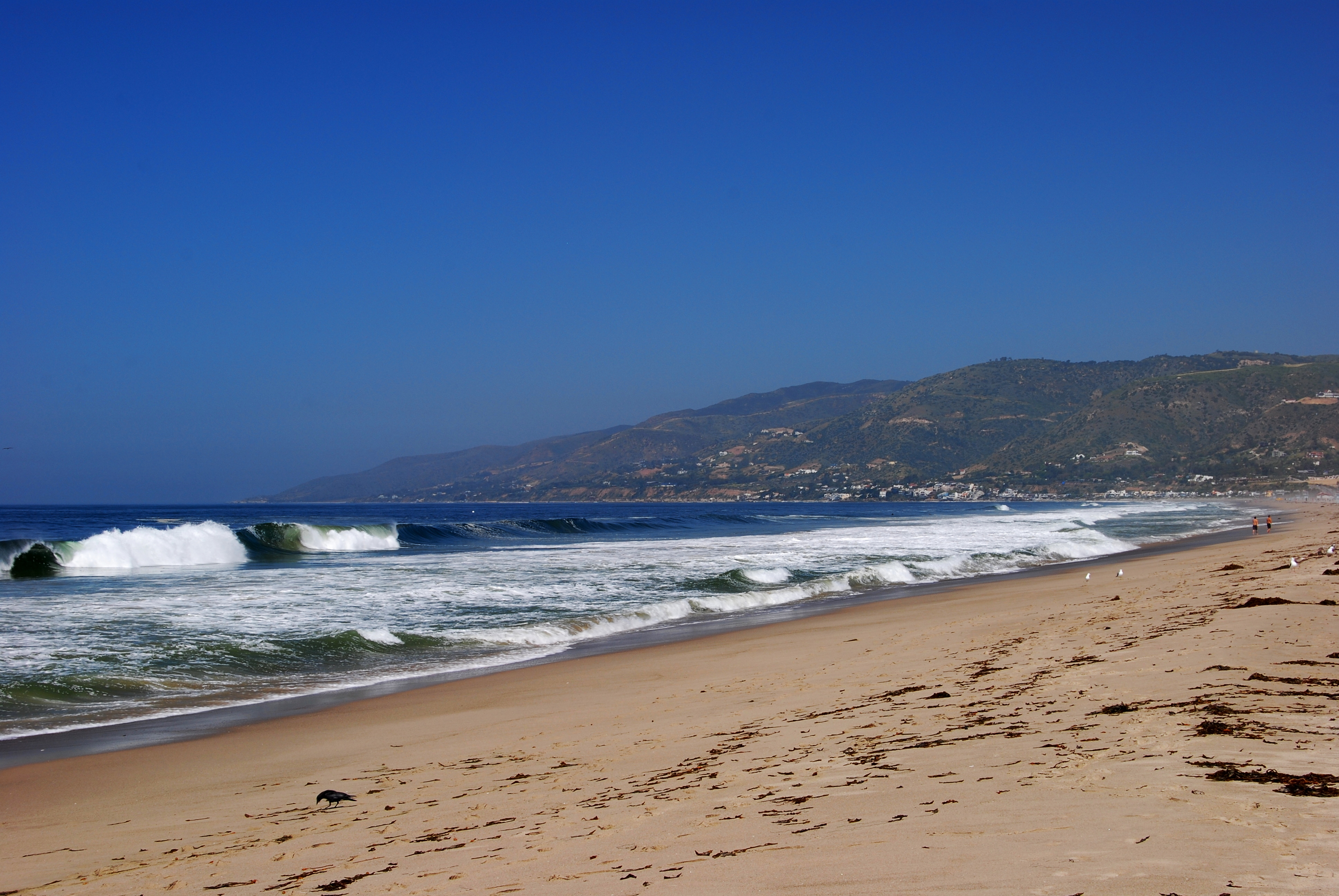
Zuma Beach

- Zamperini Field
- Zanja Madre
- Zankou Chicken
- Zen Center of Los Angeles
- Ziegler Estate
- Zuma Beach

== See also ==
- List of museums in Los Angeles
- National Register of Historic Places listings in California
