= List of Los Angeles Historic-Cultural Monuments in the Wilshire and Westlake areas =

This is a list of the Historic-Cultural Monuments in the Wilshire, Westlake and nearby areas of Los Angeles, California. There are more than 142 Historic-Cultural Monuments (HCM) in these areas. The sites have been designated by the Los Angeles Cultural Heritage Commission as worthy of preservation based on architectural, historic and cultural criteria.

== Historic-Cultural Monuments ==
HCM #	Landmark name	Image	Date designated	Locality	Neighborhood	Description
39	Lewis House		June 15, 1966	1425 Miramar St. 34°3′35″N 118°15′41″W	Westlake	Queen Anne-style Victorian house built in 1889 and attributed to Joseph Cather Newsom
45	Frederick Mitchell Mooers House		February 8, 1967	818 S. Bonnie Brae St. 34°3′12″N 118°16′29″W	Westlake	Often been used to illustrate West Coast Victorian architecture; named for owner who discovered Yellow Aster gold mine after years of prospecting in the Mojave Desert
56	Bullock's Wilshire Building		June 5, 1968	3050 Wilshire Blvd. 34°3′40″N 118°17′15″W	Mid-City	Former luxury department store; completed 1929; art deco style; noted for 241-foot (73 m) tower
81	Memorial Branch Library		April 7, 1971	4645 W. Olympic Boulevard, 90019; 34°3′23.59″N 118°19′56.68″W	Mid-Wilshire	Branch library; built in 1930; includes heraldic work of Judson Studios stained glass.
83	Boyle-Barmore Residence		July 7, 1971	1311–1321 Alvarado Ter.	Pico-Union	Part of the Alvarado Terrace Historic District
84	Cohn Residence		July 7, 1971	1325 Alvarado Ter.	Pico-Union	Part of the Alvarado Terrace Historic District
85	Gilbert Residence		July 7, 1971	1333 Alvarado Ter. 34°2′43″N 118°16′52″W	Pico-Union	Part of the Alvarado Terrace Historic District
86	Powers Residence		July 7, 1971	1345 Alvarado Ter. 34°2′43″N 118°16′53″W	Pico-Union	Part of the Alvarado Terrace Historic District. Built for Pomeroy Powers, who was a president of the City Council.
87	Raphael Residence		July 7, 1971	1353 Alvarado Ter. 34°2′43″N 118°16′54″W	Pico-Union	Part of the Alvarado Terrace Historic District
88	Kinney-Everhardy House		July 7, 1971	1401 Alvarado Ter. 34°2′43″N 118°16′55″W	Pico-Union	Part of the Alvarado Terrace Historic District
89	Central Spanish Seventh Day Adventist Church		July 7, 1971	1366 Alvarado St. & 1447–1459 Alvarado Ter. 34°2′42″N 118°17′01″W	Pico-Union	Originally First Church of Christ, Scientist; served as Los Angeles base of Jim Jones Peoples Temple in the 1970s
91	Korean Philadelphia Presbyterian Church (Temple Sinai East)		November 17, 1971	401–407 S. New Hampshire Ave. 34°4′01″N 118°17′35″W	East Hollywood	Built in 1926.
94	Queen and Washingtonia Robusta Palm Trees and Median Strip		January 26, 1972	Highland Ave. 34°4′24.61″N 118°20′18.84″W	Hancock Park	Palm trees planted in 1928 along median strip of Highland Ave. between Wilshire Blvd. and Melrose Ave.
99	Residence at 1036-1038 S. Bonnie Brae St.		April 5, 1972	1036–1038 S. Bonnie Brae St.	Pico-Union	Circa 1896 building known for its "chateau in wood" style and photogenic facade.
100	MacArthur Park (formerly Westlake Park)		May 1, 1972	2100–2320 W. 6th St.; 601–631 S. Alvarado St.; 610–680 Park View St. 34°3′31″N 118°16′39″W	Westlake	Land acquired on January 6, 1886. Lake enlarged in 1890 and bandstand erected in 1896. Renamed MacArthur Park in 1942.
113	Young's Market		March 7, 1973	1610 W. Seventh St. 34°3′14″N 118°16′14″W	Westlake	Built in 1920s as a market and office building with marble columns and terra cotta frieze; converted into lofts
114	Wilshire United Methodist Church		March 7, 1973	4350–4366 Wilshire Blvd. 34°3′41.89″N 118°19′23.66″W	Mid-Wilshire	The concrete church has elements of both Romanesque and Gothic architecture. Dedicated in 1924, designed by Allison & Allison.
115	Evans Residence		March 21, 1973	419 S. Lorraine Blvd.	Windsor Square	
116	Wilshire Boulevard Temple		March 21, 1973	3663 Wilshire Blvd. 34°3′45″N 118°18′11″W	Mid-City	Oldest Jewish synagogue in the Los Angeles area; Byzantine dome has been a Los Angeles landmark since 1929
118	Pellissier Building and Wiltern Theatre	The Wiltern Theatre, located in L.A.'s Koreatown	May 16, 1973	3780 Wilshire Blvd. 34°3′40″N 118°18′28″W	Mid-City	12-story steel-reinforced concrete office tower; on a two-story pedestal that contains ground floor retail and the Wiltern theater entrance; blue-green, terra cotta-covered tower; French Zig-Zag Moderne styling
122	Buck House		March 20, 1974	5950–5958 W. 8th St.; 805 S. Genesee Ave.	Mid-Wilshire	Designed by famed architect Rudolph Schindler in 1939.
129	Charles C. L. Leslie Residence		June 19, 1974	757–767 Garland Ave.	Westlake	Two-story Queen Anne mansion for oil executive Charles C. L. Leslie. Dennis & Farwell was the designer.
158	Mary Andrews Clark Residence of the YWCA		July 7, 1976	306–336 S. Loma Dr. 34°3′36″N 118°15′51″W	Westlake	Large French colonial chateau-style structure built in 1913 as a YWCA home for young working women; donated by William A. Clark as a tribute to his mother
167	Residence at 826 S. Coronado Street		November 17, 1976	826 S. Coronado St.	Westlake	
169	William Grant Still Residence		December 1, 1976	1262 S. Victoria Ave. 34°2′53.76″N 118°19′38.6″W	Mid-City	Residence of composer William Grant Still.
170	Paul R. Williams Residence		December 1, 1976	1690 S. Victoria Ave. 34°2′33.31″N 118°19′49.95″W	Mid-City	Residence of African-American architect Paul Williams.
173	Welsh Presbyterian Church		April 20, 1977	1153 S. Valencia St.; 1501 W. 12th St.	Pico-Union	S. Tilden Norton designed this synagogue for the Sinai congregation in 1909. The Greek-Revival structure was sold to the Welsh Presbyterian Church congregation in 1926. In 2013 the Welsh congregation sold it to songwriter/music producer Craig Taubman, who planned to use it for interfaith worship and performing arts.
183	West Facade of Pan Pacific Auditorium (site of)		March 1, 1978	7600 Beverly Blvd.	Fairfax	Demolished: 01-01-1992
208	Susana Machado Bernard House and Barn		January 17, 1979	845 S. Lake St. 34°3′15″N 118°16′44″W	Westlake	Gothic Revival mansion in Pico-Union designed by John Parkinson; built 1901
209	Wilshire Christian Church Building		January 17, 1979	3461 Wilshire Blvd.	Koreatown	
210	Terrace Park and Powers Place		February 21, 1979	Alvarado Terrace, between Powers Pl. and 14th St.	Pico-Union	Part of the Alvarado Terrace Historic District. Powers Place holds the distinction as the "shortest street in Los Angeles."
237	First Baptist Church of Los Angeles		April 9, 1981	2875 W. 8th St.; 2960–2982 Leeward; 760 S. Westmoreland Ave.	Mid-Wilshire	Constructed by Allison & Allison in 1927; "...a notable work of eclectic architecture"
238	Granada Shoppes & Studios Building		April 9, 1981	672 S. Lafayette Park Pl. 34°3′38″N 118°16′57″W	Mid-City	Complex of courtyard-connected structures built in 1927 combining office, studio, and living space under one roof
239	La Casa de las Campanas		April 9, 1981	350–354 N. June St.	Hancock Park	Built in 1928 by the Mead family; 37 rooms with a three-story clock tower housing four massive bells; designed by Lester Scherer; Spanish Colonial Revival architecture.
250	Ebell of Los Angeles Building		August 25, 1982	743 S. Lucerne Blvd. 34°3′42″N 118°19′27″W	Mid-City	Women's club on Wilshire built in 1927; includes 1,270 theater where Judy Garland was discovered and where Amelia Earhart made her last public appearance
244	Residence at 1402 Malvern Avenue		April 30, 1981	1402 Malvern Ave.; 1866 W. 14th St.	Pico-Union	
267	Park Plaza Hotel		June 24, 1983	2400–2416 W. 6th St.; 603–607 Park View St. 34°3′39″N 118°16′45″W	Westlake	
268	La Fonda Restaurant Building		June 24, 1983	2501–2511 Wilshire Blvd.	Westlake	
272	Peet House		September 21, 1983	1139 S. Harvard Blvd.	Harvard Heights	Built circa 1889, the house appears to be one of the best preserved examples in the city of the two-story version of the Victorian "plan book" modest dwelling, lacking much of the elaborate ornamentation characteristic of the more pretentious residences of the period. Declared: 9/21/83
275	Heinsbergen Decorating Company Building		January 4, 1984	7415 Beverly Blvd. 34°4′35″N 118°21′3″W	Mid-Wilshire	Castle-like building occupied by mural-painting business of Anthony Heinsbergen for more than 50 years; built with bricks from the old Los Angeles City Hall
280	Chapman Park Studio Building		July 24, 1984	3501–3519 W. 6th St.	Koreatown	
298	Crocker Bank Building		September 20, 1985	269–273 S. Western Ave.; 4359–4363 W. 3rd St.	Koreatown	
309	El Royale Apartments		September 2, 1986	450 N. Rossmore Ave. 34°4′43″N 118°19′37″W	Hancock Park	Spanish Renaissance Revival building designed by William Douglas Lee
310	Fire Station No. 29		October 1, 1986	158 S. Western Ave.	Wilshire Center	Engine Company No. 29 was designed by architect J.J. Backus; completed 1913; two-story brick building of Italian Renaissance style
311	Los Altos Apartments		October 17, 1986	4121 Wilshire Blvd. 34°3′44″N 118°19′0″W	Mid-City	Construction of this elegant example of Spanish Revival style in a unique blend of Italianate influenced ornamentation began in 1925. It was designed by E.B. Rust.
326	McKinley Mansion		September 9, 1987	310–312 S. LaFayette Park Pl.	Westlake	Demolished: 06-01-1994
327	Thomas Potter Residence		September 22, 1987	1135–1141 S. Alvarado St.	Pico-Union	Built in 1906. Hudson and Munsell were the architects.
328	August Winstel Residence		September 22, 1987	1147 S. Alvarado St.	Pico-Union	
332	Wilshire Tower		December 8, 1987	5500–5522 Wilshire Blvd.	Mid-Wilshire	
333	Grieri-Musser House		December 18, 1987	403 S. Bonnie Brae St.	Westlake	
352	Los Angeles Nurses' Club		April 8, 1988	245 S. Lucas Ave. 34°3′34″N 118°15′39″W	Los Angeles	Clubhouse and apartment building for nurses built in 1924 by nurses' club
386	Chapman Park Market Building		August 30, 1988	3451 W. 6th St.	Mid Wilshire	
403	Higgins-Verbeck-Hirsch Mansion		December 14, 1988	637 S. Lucerne Blvd.	Windsor Square	
415	Wilshire Branch Library		February 1, 1989	149 N. Saint Andrews Pl. 34°4′28″N 118°18′39″W	Mid-City	Branch library; built in 1926
420	Milbank-McFie Estate		December 13, 1989	1130 Arlington Ave. & 3340 Country Club Dr.	Arlington Heights	
423	Apartment Building at 607 Burnside Avenue		March 31, 1989	607 Burnside Ave.	Mid-Wilshire	
424	Apartment Building at 626 Burnside Avenue		March 31, 1989	626 Burnside Ave.	Mid-Wilshire	
425	Apartment Building at 636 Burnside Avenue		March 31, 1989	636 Burnside Ave.	Mid-Wilshire	
426	Apartment Building at 654 Burnside Avenue		March 31, 1989	654 Burnside Ave.	Mid-Wilshire	
427	Apartment Building at 364 Cloverdale Avenue		April 7, 1989	364 Cloverdale Ave.	Mid-Wilshire	
428	Villa Cintra		April 7, 1989	430 Cloverdale Ave.	Mid-Wilshire	
429	Apartment Building at 601 Cloverdale Avenue		April 7, 1989	601 Cloverdale Ave.	Mid-Wilshire	
430	Cornell Apartments		April 7, 1989	603 Cochran Ave.	Mid-Wilshire	
431	Residence at 1851 W. 11th Street		May 5, 1989	1851 W. 11th St.	Pico-Union	
432	Doria Apartments		May 5, 1989	1600–1604 W. Pico Blvd.	Pico-Union	Apartment building at the heart of Pico-Union, on the corner of Pico Blvd. and Union Ave. It was built by Doria Deighton Jones.
433	Alphonse J. Forget Residence		May 5, 1989	1047 S. Bonnie Brae St.	Pico-Union	
436	Howard-Nagin Residence		May 19, 1989	146 S. Fuller Ave.	Fairfax	
438	Apartments at 445 S. Detroit Street		May 19, 1989	445 S. Detroit St.	Mid-Wilshire	
439	Apartments at 450-460 S. Detroit Street		May 19, 1989	450–460 S. Detroit St.	Mid-Wilshire	
444	Octavius W. Morgan Residence		June 20, 1989	179–181 S. Alta Vista Blvd.	Fairfax	
451	Darkroom (Facade only)		August 1, 1989	5370 Wilshire Blvd.	Mid-Wilshire	1935 camera-inspired Streamline Moderne storefront
452	Felipe de Neve Branch Library		October 17, 1989	2820 W. Sixth St. 34°3′46″N 118°16′14″W	Westlake	Branch library; built in 1929; named after the Spanish governor of California who oversaw the founding of Los Angeles
454	Chouinard Institute of the Arts		October 24, 1989	2301 W. 8th St.; 737–747 Grand View St.	Westlake	Demolished prior to 2012
473	Apartment at 613 Ridgeley Drive		December 8, 1989	613 Ridgeley Dr.	Mid-Wilshire	
491	Charles B. Booth Residence and Carriage House		July 13, 1990	824–826 S. Bonnie Brae St.	Westlake	
520	El Rey Theatre		February 26, 1991	5515–5519 Wilshire Blvd. 34°3′45″N 118°20′56″W	Mid-Wilshire	
531	Wilshire Ward Chapel		May 10, 1991	1209 S. Manhattan Pl. 34°2′56″N 118°18′39″W	Angelus Vista	Built in Art Deco – Modern style in 1929, serves as a meetinghouse for members of the Church of Jesus Christ of Latter-day Saints (LDS Church). Open Admission.
534	I. Magnin & Company Building		June 11, 1991	3240 Wilshire Blvd. & 650 New Hampshire Ave.	East Hollywood	
538	David J. Witmer Family Houses and Compound		July 2, 1991	1422 W. 2nd St. & 208–210 1/2 Witmer St.	Westlake	
543	Farmers Market		July 24, 1991	Gilmore Ln.; W. 3rd St. & W. Fairfax Ave. 34°4′21″N 118°21′37″W	Fairfax	
546	Westlake Theatre		September 24, 1991	634–642 S. Alvarado St. 34°3′30″N 118°16′31″W	Westlake	Movie theater built in 1926
552	Einar C. Petersen Studio Court		November 13, 1991	4350–4352 1/2 Beverly Blvd. 34°4′34.21″N 118°18′12.1″W	Koreatown	
555	Mother Trust Superet Center		March 18, 1992	2506–2522 W. 3rd St.	Westlake	
566	May Company Wilshire		September 30, 1992	6067 Wilshire Blvd. 34°3′48″N 118°21′40″W	Mid-Wilshire	
568	Thomas A. Churchill Sr. Residence		October 27, 1992	215 S. Wilton Pl.	Windsor Square	
576	Sheraton Town House Hotel		April 7, 1993	2959–2973 Wilshire Blvd. and 607–643 S. Commonwealth Ave. 34°3′44″N 118°17′5″W	Mid-City	
588	Janss Investment Company Uptown Branch Office Bldg. (Sokol Hall)		November 30, 1993	4761–4775 Maplewood Ave; 500–508 Western Ave.	East Hollywood	
618	McDonnell Residence Founder's Home: Urban Academy		November 22, 1995	601 N. Wilcox Ave.	Hancock Park	
619	Wolff-Fifield House		June 21, 1996	111 N. June St.	Hancock Park	This 1929 Tudor Revival style residence was the home of financier Ralph Wolff and Reverend James Fifield, pastor of the First Congregational Church.
628	Jack Doyle Residence		January 9, 1996	620 S. Irving Blvd.	Windsor Square	Mediterranean-style residence for boxing promoter Jack Doyle; D.S. Haag designed in 1919.
636	C.A. Fellows Residence		March 18, 1997	1215 Westchester Pl.	Arlington Heights	
639	Ruskin Art Club		March 18, 1997	800 S. Plymouth Blvd.	Mid-Wilshire	
641	Brynmoor Apartments Neon Roof Sign		June 4, 1997	432–436 S. New Hampshire Ave. 34°3′58.57″N 118°17′33.36″W	Koreatown	
642	Embassy Apartments Neon Roof Sign		June 4, 1997	702–708 S. Mariposa Ave.	Koreatown	
643	Superba Apartments Incandescent Roof Sign		June 4, 1997	335 S. Berendo St.	Koreatown	
646	Villa Serrano		December 19, 1997	930–940 S. Serrano Ave. 34°3′17″N 118°18′23.93″W	Koreatown	
649	Cora B. Henderson House		April 7, 1998	132 S. Wilton Pl.	Koreatown	
650	Mortensen House		April 7, 1998	103 S. Wilton Dr.	Koreatown	
651	Filipino Christian Church		May 5, 1998	301 N. Union Ave.	Westlake	
653	Bryson Apartments		September 18, 1998	2701 Wilshire Blvd. 34°3′40″N 118°16′53″W	Mid-City	Built in 1913, its rooftop sign and lions are Wilshire Blvd. landmarks; also closely associated with works of Raymond Chandler and film noir genre
660	Rosenheim Mansion		June 22, 1999	1120 S. Westchester Pl.	Arlington Heights	
661	Rives Mansion		June 22, 1999	1130 S. Westchester Pl.	Arlington Heights	
667	The Leader Building roof-top Neon Sign		September 29, 1999	344–346 N. Fairfax Ave.	Fairfax	
677	Horatio Cogswell House		April 25, 2000	1244 S. Van Ness Ave.	Arlington Heights	
684	Heart House		October 3, 2000	112 N. Harvard Blvd.	Koreatown	
701	Burnside Manor		July 31, 2001	600 S. Burnside Ave.	Mid-Wilshire	
706	First Congregational Church of Los Angeles		March 15, 2002	540 S. Commonwealth Ave.	Westlake	Designed by Allison & Allison, built of reinforced concrete in 1932. Church founded 1867, oldest Protestant congregation in L.A.
707	Weber House		March 15, 2002	3923 W. 9th St.	Koreatown	
719	Edward Alexander Kelley Hackett House		October 1, 2002	1317 S. Westlake Ave. 34°2′43″N 118°16′51″W	Pico-Union	Craftsman-style house built in 1923
727	Founder's Church of Religious Science		October 2, 2002	3281 W. 6th St. 34°03′50″N 118°17′37″W	Koreatown	
743	Immanuel Presbyterian Church		February 4, 2003	3300 Wilshire Blvd.	Koreatown	
756	Henry W. O'Melveny House		July 15, 2003	501 S. Plymouth	Windsor Square	
768	Ravenswood Apartments		November 7, 2003	570 N. Rossmore Ave. 34°4′51″N 118°19′37″W	Hancock Park	Art deco building built by Paramount Pictures in 1930s
777	Weaver Residence		April 14, 2004	4940 Melrose Hill St.	East Hollywood	
790	Belmont Tunnel / Toluca Substation and Yard		February 23, 2005	1304 W. 2nd St.	Westlake	Entrance to the Hollywood Subway of the Pacific Electric Railway
792	B.H. Hiss House		May 4, 2005	215 S. Manhattan Pl.	Wilshire Center	
794	Carolyn Bumiller-Hickey House		May 4, 2005	1049 Elden Ave.	Pico-Union	
796	Jacobson Duplex		May 4, 2005	1200–1202 S. Highland Ave.	Mid-Wilshire	
803	A.W. Black Residence		June 1, 2005	658 S. Bronson Ave.	Koreatown	
804	Gless Apartments		June 1, 2005	357 S. Kenmore Ave.	Koreatown	
805	J.A. Howsley House		June 1, 2005	221 S. Manhattan Pl.	Koreatown	
809	Franklin T Briles Residence		July 8, 2005	151 N. Berendo St. 34°4′27.52″N 118°17′40.31″W	Koreatown	
810	Edward J. Borgmeyer House		July 8, 2005	138 N. Manhattan Pl.	Wilshire Center	
813	Security-First National Bank		July 8, 2005	5209 Wilshire Blvd. 34°3′45″N 118°20′33″W	Mid-City	Former Art Deco-style bank branch
815	French Chateau Apartments		July 8, 2005	900 S. Hobart Ave.; 3348–3350 W. James M. Wood Blvd.	Koreatown	
835	Petitfils-Boos Residence		January 25, 2006	545 S. Plymouth Blvd. 34°3′51″N 118°19′19″W	Mid-City	
847	Richardson Apartments		August 16, 2006	3919 W. 8th St.; 718 S. Gramercy Dr.	Koreatown	
850	William J. Hubbard Residence		September 13, 2006	811 S. Norton Ave.	Koreatown	
853	La Marquise		September 27, 2006	535 S. Gramercy Pl.	Koreatown	
858	One Hundred Sycamore		November 22, 2006	100 N. Sycamore Ave.	Hancock Park	
861	Monsignor O'Brien House		February 6, 2007	130 N. Catalina Ave.	Koreatown	
863	Los Tiempos-The Chandler Estate		March 7, 2007	455 S. Lorraine Blvd.	Windsor Square	
870	San Marino Villas		May 16, 2007	3390–3396 W. San Marino St.	Wilshire Center	The three-story luxury apartment was designed by architect H. Monroe Banfield in 1923, of Spanish Colonial/Mission Revival style. Destroyed by fire in 2013.
875	Val D'Amour Apartments		June 5, 2007	854 S. Oxford Ave.	Koreatown	
878	Arwyn Manor		July 17, 2007	3835 W. 8th St.; 749 S. Manhattan Pl.	Koreatown	
923	Kennedy Solow House		July 2, 2008	6606 Maryland Dr.	Beverly Grove	
925	Residence at 212 South Wilton Place		July 9, 2008	212 S. Wilton Pl.	Koreatown	
928	Chateau Alpine		July 9, 2008	918–928 1/2 S. Serrano Ave. 34°3′18.4″N 118°18′23.01″W	Koreatown	
929	Oliver Flats		July 9, 2008	407–409 North Orange Drive. 34°4′42.97″N 118°20′31.9″W	Hancock Park	
934	Park Wilshire Building		September 25, 2008	2424 Wilshire Blvd.	Westlake	Built in 1923, designed by Clarence H. Russell and Norman W. Alpaugh.
943	Heerman Estate		January 28, 2009	525 S. Van Ness Ave.	Windsor Square	Colonial Revival residence, 1908, notable 1919 alteration by Walker & Eisen.
945	The Beverly Sycamore		February 25, 2009	308 N. Sycamore Ave. 34°4′35.32″N 118°20′32.75″W	Hancock Park	Chateauesque-French Norman Revival style apartment building, 1928.
954	Dunsmuir Flats		May 20, 2009	1281 S. Dunsmuir Ave. 34°3′3.24″N 118°21′10.79″W	Wilshire Vista Heights	International Style, 1938, by architect Gregory Ain.
958	Bob Baker Marionette Theater		June 3, 2009	1345 W. First St.	Echo Park	
959	See's Candy Shop and Kitchen No. 1		June 24, 2009	139 N. Western Ave. 34°4′27.26″N 118°18′32.98″W	Mid-Wilshire	Italian Renaissance Revival style commercial building, 1921.
960	Ashby Apartments		August 5, 2009	808 S. Hobart Blvd. 34°3′26.79″N 118°18′18.96″W	Mid-Wilshire	Art Deco style by architect Max Maltzman, 1907.
961	Marshall-Kline Residence		August 5, 2009	2037 S. Harvard Blvd.	West Adams Heights	Italian Renaissance Revival, 1907.
962	Eckley-Mitchell Residence		September 23, 2009	2048 S. Oxford Boulevard, 90018	Mid-Wilshire	Craftsman style, 1907.
963	Linda Scott Residence		September 23, 2009	1910 S. Harvard Blvd. 34°2′58.88″N 118°18′16.06″W	West Adams Heights	Mediterranean style, 1907, designed by Frank Tyler for the first female deputy sheriff in the state of Arizona.
969	Frank E. Hartigan Residence		January 27, 2010	1034 S. Gramercy Place, 90019; 34°3′6.53″N 118°18′46.57″W	Mid-Wilshire	American Craftsman house built in 1913.
970	844 South Plymouth Apartments		January 27, 2010	844 S. Plymouth Blvd. 34.058516°N 118.324343°W	Mid-Wilshire	Streamline Moderne apartment building, built in 1936 in Windsor Village, designed by architects Charles Plummer, Welton Becket and Walter Wurdeman.
980	Frank C. Hill House		March 31, 2010	201 S. Coronado Street, 90057; 34°4′4.67″N 118°16′36.68″W	Westlake	Craftsman style, 1910, by Albert R. Walker and John C. Vawter.
991	Lucy E. Wheeler/Martin E. Weil House		November 3, 2010	2175 Cambridge Street, 90057; 34°02′40.94″N 118°18′25.42″W	Harvard Heights, West Adams	Craftsman style, 1905, by Greene and Greene.
1020	Firestone Building		May 30, 2012	800 South La Brea Avenue, 90036	Mid-Wilshire	Streamline Moderne
1023	West Boulevard Bridge		November 3, 2013	Venice Boulevard between 16th Place and Victoria Park Drive; 34°02′47.8″N 118°20′04.0″W	Victoria Park, West Adams	Art Deco Bridge, 1933.
1045	Johnie's Coffee Shop		November 27, 2013	6101 Wilshire Boulevard; 34°3′47.84″N 118°21′41.77″W	Mid-Wilshire	Googie style restaurant designed by Armét & Davis, 1956.
1179	Charlotte Chase Apartments		April 2, 2019	1074-76 South Genesee Avenue	Wilshire Vista	Four-plex apartment building.
1180	Charles H. Bevis Duplex		April 2, 2019	1080-1082 South Genesee Avenue	Wilshire Vista	1933 Duplex apartment building.

== Non-HCM historic sites recognized by state and nation ==
Code	Landmark name	Image	Date designated	Locality	Neighborhood	Description
1002	La Brea Tar Pits			5801 Wilshire Blvd.	Miracle Mile	SM#170
2087– 2151	Wilton Historic District			S. Wilton Pl.; S. Wilton Dr.; Ridgewood Pl. 34°4′16″N 118°18′47″W	Mid-City	
2157- 2175	Miracle Mile Historic District			5350–5511 Wilshire Blvd.	Miracle Mile	Properties include Hahn's Music Pianos and Organs, Wilshire Center Building, Tru-Line Litho, Loman Foods Mart, Flying Saucer Restaurant, Zachary All, Korean Cultural Services Building, Wilshire Beauty Supply, Ever-Ready Lighting Center, Dominguez-Wilshire Building, Jack La Lanne's European Health Spa, Post Office Building, and Brown's Wilshire Bakery
2176	Crocker Bank			1926–1930 Wilshire Blvd.	Westlake	
2182	McKinley Building			3747–3763 Wilshire Blvd.	Wilshire Center	demolished in 1998
2183	Zephyr Club			5209 Wilshire Blvd.	Miracle Mile	
2184	Clem Wilson Building			5217–5231 Wilshire Blvd.	Miracle Mile	
2259	Ambassador Hotel			3400 Wilshire Blvd.	Mid-Wilshire	
2305	Alvarado Terrace Historic District			Alvarado Ter.; Bonnie Brae and 14th Sts. 34°2′42″N 118°16′50″W	Pico-Union	Historic district southwest of downtown with well-preserved mansions built 1902–1907 overlooking park
2312	South Bonnie Brae Tract Historic District			1851 W. 11th St.; 1032 and 1036 S. Bonnie Brae St.	Pico-Union	Bonnie Brae Street houses shown.
2313	South Serrano Avenue Historic District			400–457 S. Serrano Ave. (both sides of street)	Koreatown	
2377	Melrose Hotel			5150–5174 Melrose Ave.	Larchmont	
2396	Chapman Park Market Building			3451–3479 W. 6th St.	Mid-Wilshire	
2445	Royal Lake			2202–2220 W. 11th St.	Pico-Union	
2452	Marks Residence			1357–1359 Constance St.; 1709–1711 14th St.	Pico-Union	
2469	Korea Times			135–141 N. Vermont Ave.	Koreatown	
2478	Willet Apartments			1426–1428 3/4 S. Bonnie Brae St.	Pico-Union	
2519	Royal Lake			2200–2220 W. 11th St.	Pico-Union	
2520	Burch Residence			1805 W. 12th Place	Pico-Union	
2521	B. Bodwell Residence			926–928 W. 17th St.	Pico-Union	
2533	Cook Residence			1025 S. Westlake Ave.	Pico-Union	
2534	Wilshire-Westlake Professional Building			2001–2015 Wilshire Blvd.; 639 S. Westlake Ave.	Westlake	

== See also ==
- Bibliography of Los Angeles
- Outline of the history of Los Angeles
- Bibliography of California history

=== Lists of L.A. Historic-Cultural Monuments ===
- Historic-Cultural Monuments in Downtown Los Angeles
- Historic-Cultural Monuments on the East and Northeast Sides
- Historic-Cultural Monuments in the Harbor area
- Historic-Cultural Monuments in Hollywood
- Historic-Cultural Monuments in the San Fernando Valley
- Historic-Cultural Monuments in Silver Lake, Angelino Heights, and Echo Park
- Historic-Cultural Monuments in South Los Angeles
- Historic-Cultural Monuments on the Westside

=== Other ===
- City of Los Angeles' Historic Preservation Overlay Zones
- National Register of Historic Places listings in Los Angeles
- National Register of Historic Places listings in Los Angeles County
- List of California Historical Landmarks
