= Alvarado Terrace Historic District =

Historic district in California, United States

- U.S. National Register of Historic Places
- U.S. Historic district
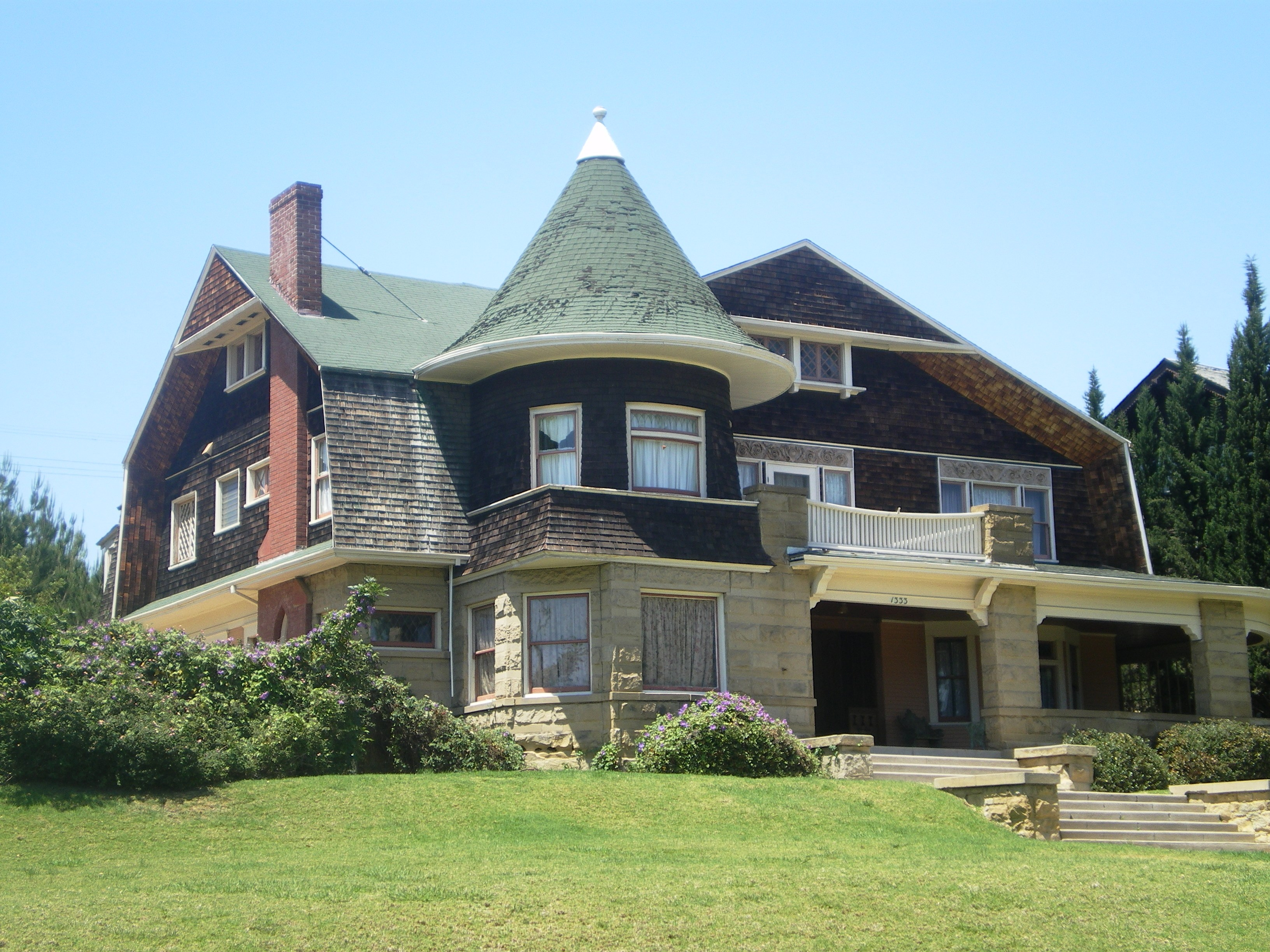
- Gilbert House, 1333 Alvarado Terrace

- Location within Los Angeles
- Location: Los Angeles, California
- Coordinates: 34°2′42″N 118°16′50″W
- Built: 1902
- Architectural style: Bungalow/Craftsman, Modern Movement
- NRHP reference No.: 84000783
- Added to NRHP: May 17, 1984

Alvarado Terrace Historic District is a designated historic district in the Pico-Union neighborhood of Los Angeles, California. It is located southwest of Downtown Los Angeles, along Alvarado Terrace between Pico Boulevard and Alvarado Street.

Six homes and a church in the district were designated as Los Angeles Historic-Cultural Monuments in 1971, and the entire district was listed in the National Register of Historic Places in 1984.

== Early history ==
The Alvarado Terrace Historic District is within the original Spanish Pueblo of Los Angeles boundaries established in 1781. During the late 19th century, the land was owned by Doria Deighton Jones, the widow of a wholesale grocer. In 1897, the Los Angeles Golf Club (predecessor of the Los Angeles Country Club) leased the land and built a nine-hole golf course that came to be known as "Windmill Links," due to the use of an old windmill as the clubhouse.

Jones subdivided the land into residential lots in 1902. The lots were sold for $10 each, with the caveat that the buyer was required to build a house costing at least $4,000. The area was promoted as a "second Chester Place," referring to the city's most prestigious street in the West Adams district. By 1906, the development was full.

== Terrace Park and Powers Place ==
In an effort to enhance the neighborhood, one of its chief promoters (and president of the City Council), Pomeroy Powers, persuaded the city in 1904 to construct a park along Alvarado Terrace. Originally called Summerland Park, the park was soon renamed Terrace Park. The park included a fish pond, rose beds, an underground tool shed, and a full-time gardener. The park was later remodeled with only grass and trees. There is a small strip of brick-paved street at the north end of the park known as "Powers Place" that holds the distinction as the "shortest street in Los Angeles." The park and brick-paved street were declared a Historic-Cultural Monument (HCM #210) in February 1979. By 1983, Terrace Park was suffering from neglect and was described as "so bare it's hardly recognizable as a park."

== Six homes designated as Cultural Historic Monuments ==
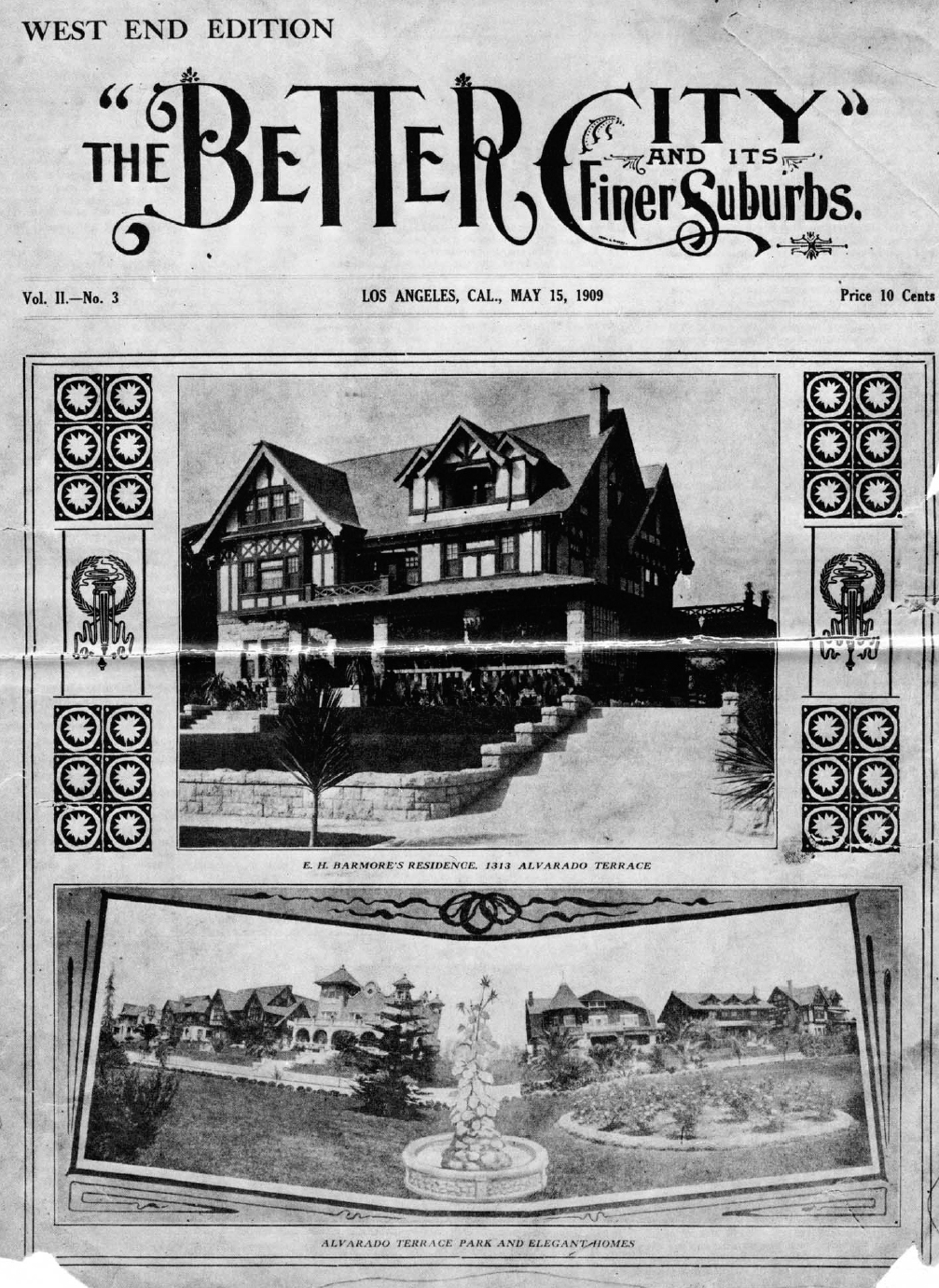
Magazine feature on Alvarado Terrace, 1909

Alvarado Terrace has the distinction of having six houses on a single block (all on the north side) designated as Historic-Cultural Monuments by the City of Los Angeles Cultural Heritage Commission. The six houses were designated as Historic-Cultural Monument nos. 83-88 in July 1971. The houses were built on a raised terrace overlooking Terrace Park. The designated homes were built between 1902 and 1905 and reflect a rich eclecticism in their architectural style. They include Craftsman, Victorian, Mission, Tudor, and Shingle style architecture. A real estate brochure from 1903 described the neighborhood this way: "The only exclusive Residential Tract in the city. Beautiful Parks. Shade Trees Planted. High Class building restrictions. No flats, cottages or stores. Wide streets conforming to the contour of the land with cement sidewalks, curbs and gutters. Perfect sewer system, water, gas, electric lights..." With the park and well-preserved homes, the district provides a complete historic neighborhood that has been featured in motion picture and television productions. While the surrounding area has been described as "low-income and multicultural," the Los Angeles Times in 1991 described Alvarado Terrace as "a slice of L.A.'s genteel and moneyed past preserved."

=== Boyle-Barmore House ===
As one enters Alvarado Terrace from the north, the first of the designated homes is Boyle-Barmore House, located at 1317 Alvarado Terrace (pictured, above left). Built in 1905, the house was designed by architect Charles E. Shattuck in a Craftsman style with Tudor influences, including a three-gabled dormer. The house was built for Calvin A. Boyle, one of the founders of the Hollywood Board of Trade. The house was acquired in 1908 by Edmund H. Barmore, president of the Los Angeles Transfer Company. The house was used in the 1980s as a women's shelter by the Union Rescue Mission.

=== Cohn House ===
The second of the designated homes on the north side of the street is the Cohn House at 1325 Alvarado Terrace. Built in 1902, the house was designed by Frank D. Hudson and William Munsell. Hudson and Munsell also designed the Museum of Science and Industry, the first museum built in the city's Exposition Park. Cohn House combines Craftsman style in its first floor of rock-faced sandstone, and a second level reflecting the Shingle style. The house also has three gabled dormers that give the house the look of a Swiss chalet. The house was built for Morris Cohn, a textile manufacturer. Cohn has the distinction of having both his residence and his textile factory designated as Historic-Cultural Monuments (HCM #84 and HCM #110). Cohn House was used in the 1980s as a men's shelter by the Union Rescue Mission.

=== Gilbert House ===
Gilbert House, located at 1333 Alvarado Terrace (pictured above right), was built on speculation in 1903 by Ida and Pomeroy Powers, who also built and lived in the Powers House next door. Gilbert House is one of the most eye-catching homes in the district built with a mix of Victorian, Shingle-Style and Craftsman styles. The house was first purchased and occupied by Wilbur F. Gilbert, a wealthy Texas oil man. Gilbert's daughter, Carolyn McCulloch (d. December 24, 1992), was still living in the house in the 1980s.

=== Powers House ===
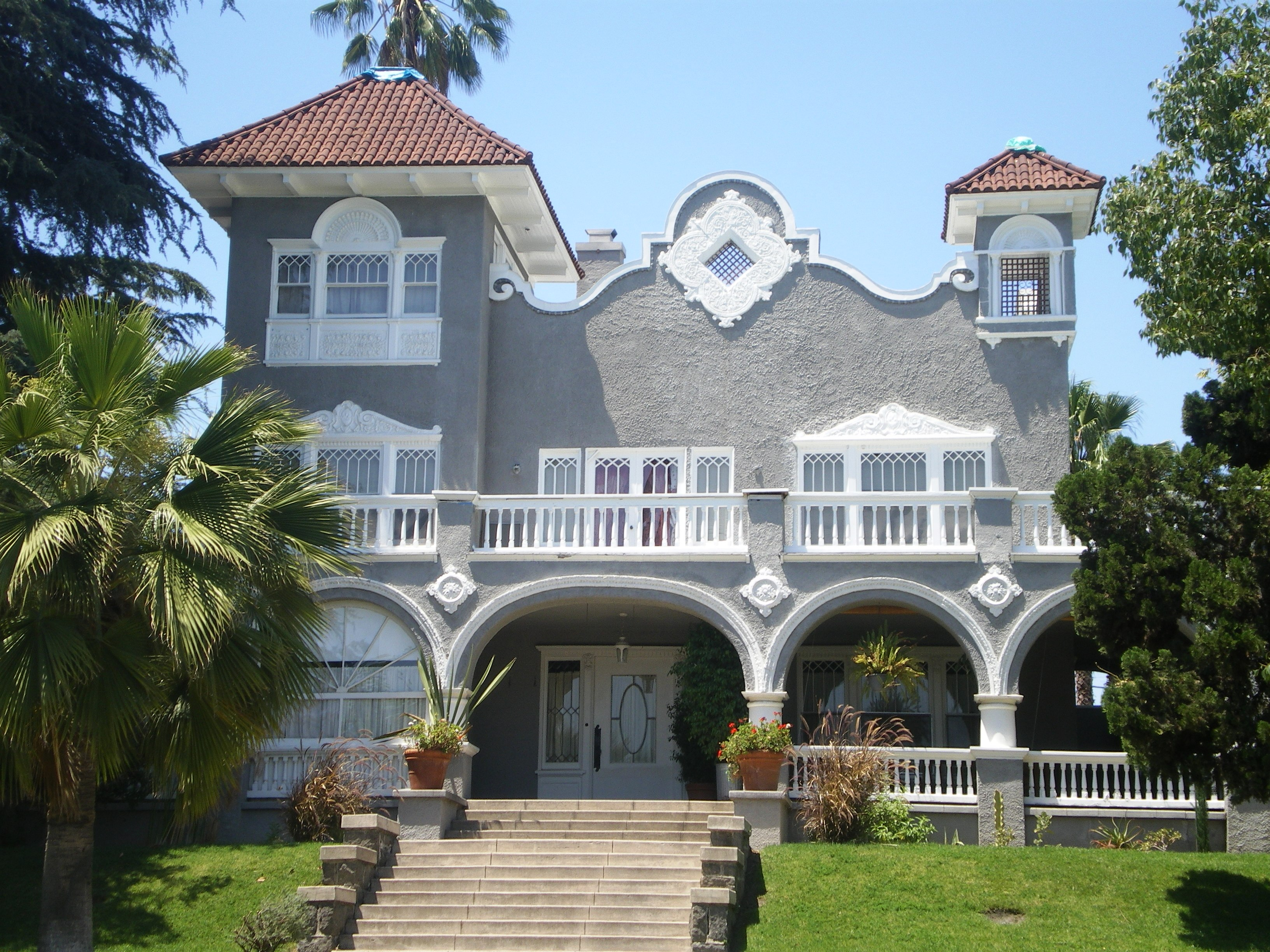
Powers House, 1345 Alvarado Terrace

Powers House at 1345 Alvarado Terrace (HCM #86) was built in 1903 for Pomeroy Wells Powers and his wife Ida. Designed by Arthur L. Haley, the home is built in the Mission Revival style, and has been described as "exuberant" and the "flashiest on the block" for its fanciful stucco curlicue. The stucco house has an arcaded veranda that supports a second-floor balcony. Rising from the balcony are towers connected by a curved parapet wall. The large corner tower has a loft room accessible only from the home's exterior.

Pomeroy Powers was a lawyer who was one of the original developers of Alvarado Terrace. He was also a member of the City Council and an officer of the Juanity Mining Company and the Short Line Beach Company. The house was restored in the mid-1970s by owner Ann Gutierrez, including new walls, plumbing, wiring and ceilings. In the 1990s, the house was used as a restaurant known as Salisbury Manor, with dining downstairs and the upstairs consisting of restored bedrooms available for viewing by patrons. A review of the restaurant noted that, "with some myopia and imagination," the restaurant and neighborhood allowed a glimpse of an earlier era. "What with the good decent food, a dose of history tempered with nostalgia, a seat in a shaft of afternoon sun and a cup of chamomile tea in my hand, I couldn't help but think there are far worse things in life than a meal on Alvarado Terrace."

=== Raphael House ===
The Tudor-style Raphael House at 1353 Alvarado Terrace (HCM #87), built in 1903, was designed by architects Sumner P. Hunt and Wesley A. Eager. Hunt was also responsible for the Raymond Hotel in Pasadena, the Casa de Rosas in North University Park, the Automobile Club building at Figueroa and West Adams, and Ebell of Los Angeles. Originally owned by Robert H. Raphael, the owner of Raphael Glass Company, the house is noted for its extensive use of both stained and leaded glass. Over the Labor Day weekend in 1995, the owner stripped Raphael House of some of its finer accessories, including stained glass windows, wooden fireplaces, and even the plaques identifying its historical status. The city's Department of Building and Safety stepped in and ordered the owner to return the fixtures or face fines and possible jail time.

=== Kinney-Everhardy House ===
Built in 1902, the Kinney-Everhardy House at 1401 Alvarado Terrace (HCM #88) was built by the same architects (Hunt & Eager) who designed the Raphael House next door. The house has been described as "an eclectic combination of elements from both the Queen Anne and Shingle styles."

== First Church of Christ, Scientist and the Peoples Temple ==
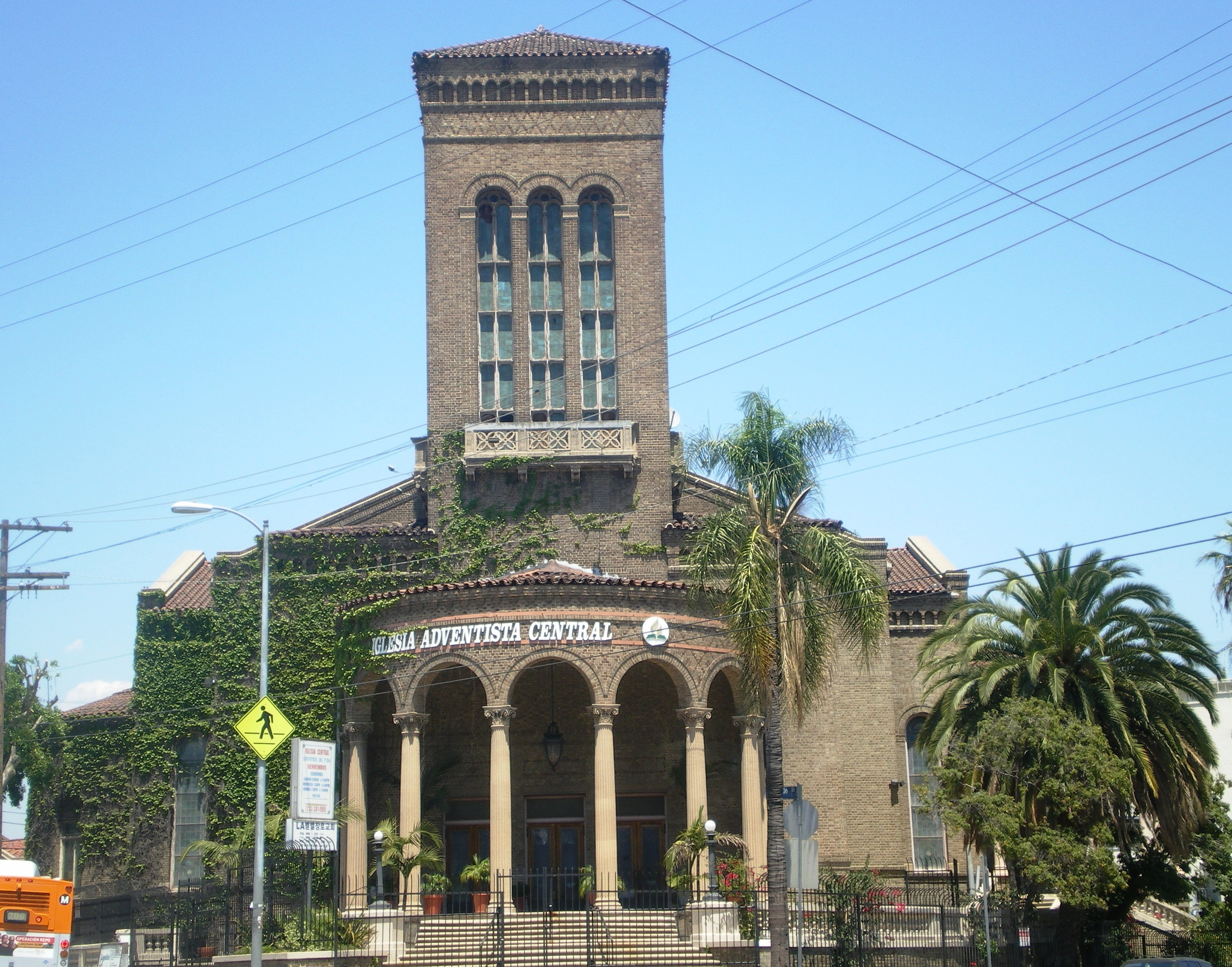
Jim Jones' Peoples Temple operated out of this church in the Alvarado Terrace district in the 1970s.

The district also includes the former First Church of Christ, Scientist built in 1912 on an odd-shaped lot at the corner of Alvarado and Hoover streets. The church was designed by architect Elmer Grey, who was also responsible for the Beverly Hills Hotel (1911), the Huntington Gallery and Library (1910), and the Pasadena Playhouse (1924–25). The church has been variously described as Beaux-Arts, Italian and Spanish Romanesque, and Mediterranean. The building's most notable features include its semi-circular porch with fluted columns, brick tower, rounded arches, and tiled roof.

The building has had a colorful history, having housed Jim Jones' Peoples Temple from 1970 until their move to Jonestown, Guyana in 1977. In 1975, the Los Angeles Times noted the Peoples Temple's move into the old church: "People's Temple, a Disciples of Christ church, now occupies the old First Church building." After the mass suicide in Jonestown, the Times noted that the Peoples Temple had moved out of the "huge Italian Renaissance-style church" in 1977.

The church was designated as Historic-Cultural Monument no. 89 in 1971. In 2008, the church was operated as the "Iglesia Adventista Central," as shown in the adjacent picture. An interesting profile and several photographs of the church can be found on the Big Orange Landmarks web site.

== National Register of Historic Places ==
In 1983, the Alvarado Terrace area was submitted to the U.S. Department of the Interior to be considered for designation as the city's third officially recognized historic district. (Wilton Place and Whitley Heights were designated earlier.) To draw attention to the effort, many of the homes were opened to tours. The district obtained the recognition it sought in 1984 with its inclusion in the National Register of Historic Places. Pico Union became the city's 19th Historic Preservation Overlay Zone Historic Preservation Overlay Zone on August 10, 2004. HPOZ Map

== Notable people ==
- Elizabeth Harrower (1918 - 2003), actress, writer
- Jim Jones, founder and the leader of the Peoples Temple
- Jacob Kuhrts, 19th Century Los Angeles businessman and politician
- Pomeroy Wills Powers, president, Los Angeles City Council, 1900–02
- Susan Seaforth Hayes, actress

== See also ==
- List of Los Angeles Historic-Cultural Monuments in the Wilshire and Westlake areas + Pico-Union.
- List of Registered Historic Places in Los Angeles
- Pico-Union, Los Angeles
