= Elizabeth Harrower =

Elizabeth Harrower may refer to:

- Elizabeth Harrower (actress) (1918–2003), American actress and screenwriter
- Elizabeth Harrower (writer) (1928–2020), Australian novelist and short story writer
