= Wilshire Bowl =

Former nightclub in Los Angeles

- Interactive map of the Wilshire Bowl area

General information
- Architectural style: Art Deco
- Location: 5665 Wilshire Blvd. Los Angeles, California, U.S.
- Coordinates: 34°03′46″N 118°21′08″W
- Year built: 1935
- Opened: April 26, 1935; 90 years ago
- Closed: 1950; 76 years ago

Design and construction
- Architect: Max Maltzman

The Wilshire Bowl was a nightclub in the Miracle Mile neighborhood of Los Angeles. Located on Wilshire Boulevard, it operated from 1935 until 1950, later under the name Slapsy Maxie's when Maxie Rosenbloom managed it. Local architect Max Maltzman designed the building in the Art Deco style.

In 1950, the building was demolished and replaced with a Van de Kamp's coffee shop. The site is currently used as retail space.

== History ==
Karl L. Loeb, manager of the Hillcrest Country Club, commissioned construction of the Wilshire Bowl at 5665 Wilshire Boulevard; it opened on April 26, 1935, with an eleven-piece band conducted by composer Bela Schaffer. Its first manager was Dave Blumgarten.

On October 1, 1936, Sterling Young began a 10-month residency as the Wilshire Bowl's bandleader, taking over duties from Larry Lee. Les Parker signed a six-month contract to play at the venue in January 1938, broadcast on the radio stations KEHE and KNX. On October 25, 1938, Phil Harris opened with his band at the Wilshire Bowl to an audience that included Bob Hope, Don Ameche, Jack Benny, Mary Livingstone, and Andy Devine.

On November 3, 1943, the Wilshire Bowl reopened as Slapsy Maxie's, under the new management of Maxie Rosenbloom with Phil Harris remaining as the house bandleader.

On March 10, 1950, Van de Kamp's Holland Dutch Bakeries signed a 25-year, US$1,000,000 ($13,382,000 in 2025) lease for 5665 Wilshire with plans to replace the Wilshire Bowl with a coffee shop. The new building, designed by Welton Becket and Associates, opened in 1951. The coffee shop was eventually demolished and replaced with retail space, its current use.
