= Paul R. Williams Residence =

Los Angeles Historic-Cultural Monument

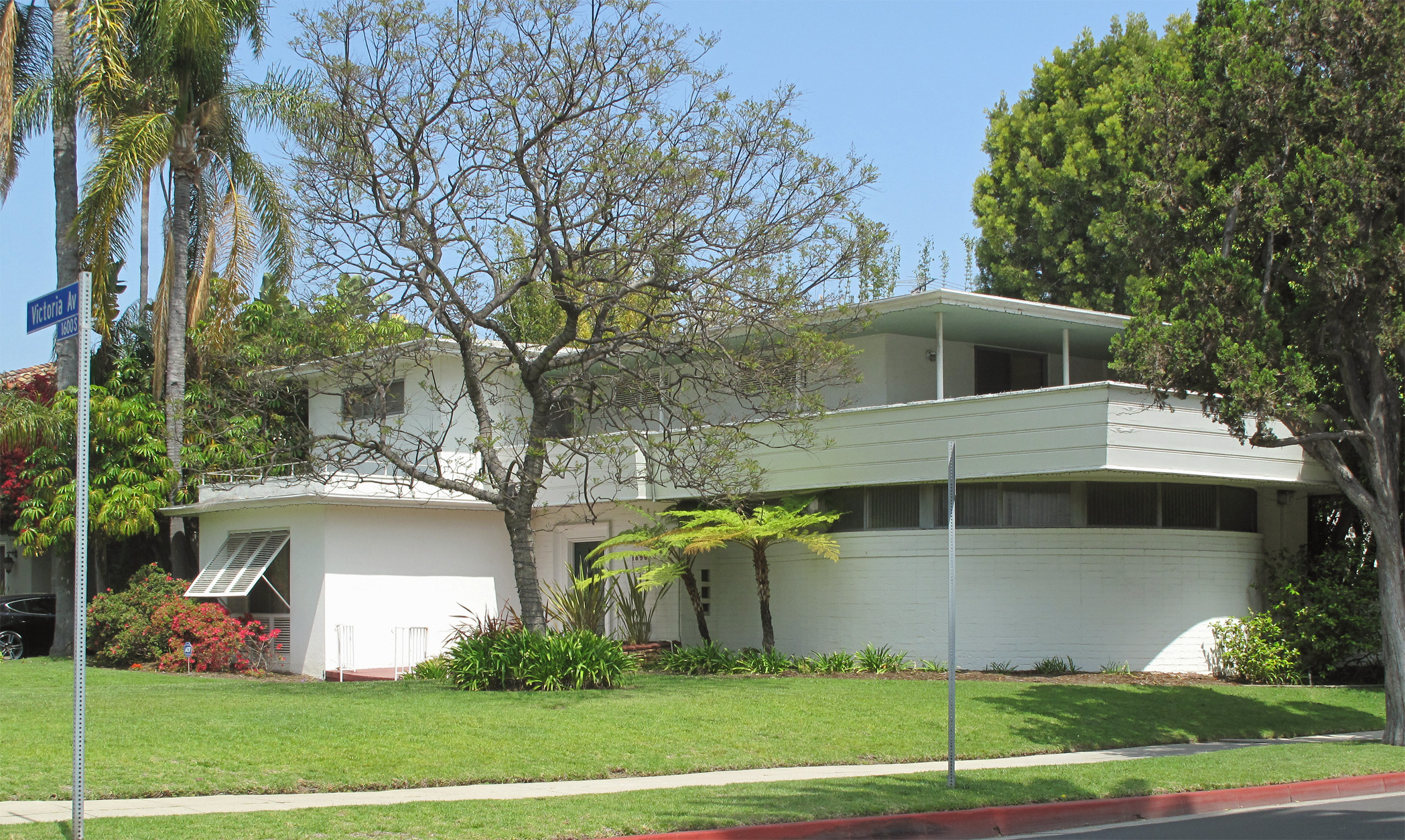

- Location within California
- 34.04264°N 118.33054°W
- Location: 1690 S. Victoria Avenue, Mid-City, Los Angeles, California

History
- Built: 1952

Site notes
- Architect: Paul Williams
- Architectural style: International style
- Governing body: private

Los Angeles Historic-Cultural Monument
- Designated: 1976
- Reference no.: 170

The Paul R. Williams Residence was the home of the architect and Spingarn Medal winner Paul Williams. The residence is located in the Lafayette Square neighborhood of Mid-City, Los Angeles. The house has been designated as a Los Angeles Historic-Cultural Monument by the city of Los Angeles. This four-bedroom, 4,440-square-foot (412 m^{2}) house was designed and built in the International style in 1952.

Though known as an "architect to the stars", working in many exclusive Los Angeles neighborhoods, the African American Williams built his own house in a neighborhood free of racial restrictions.

== See also ==
- List of Los Angeles Historic-Cultural Monuments in the Wilshire and Westlake areas
