= The Ravenswood =

Apartment building, Los Angeles Historic-Cultural Monument

Ravenswood Apartments
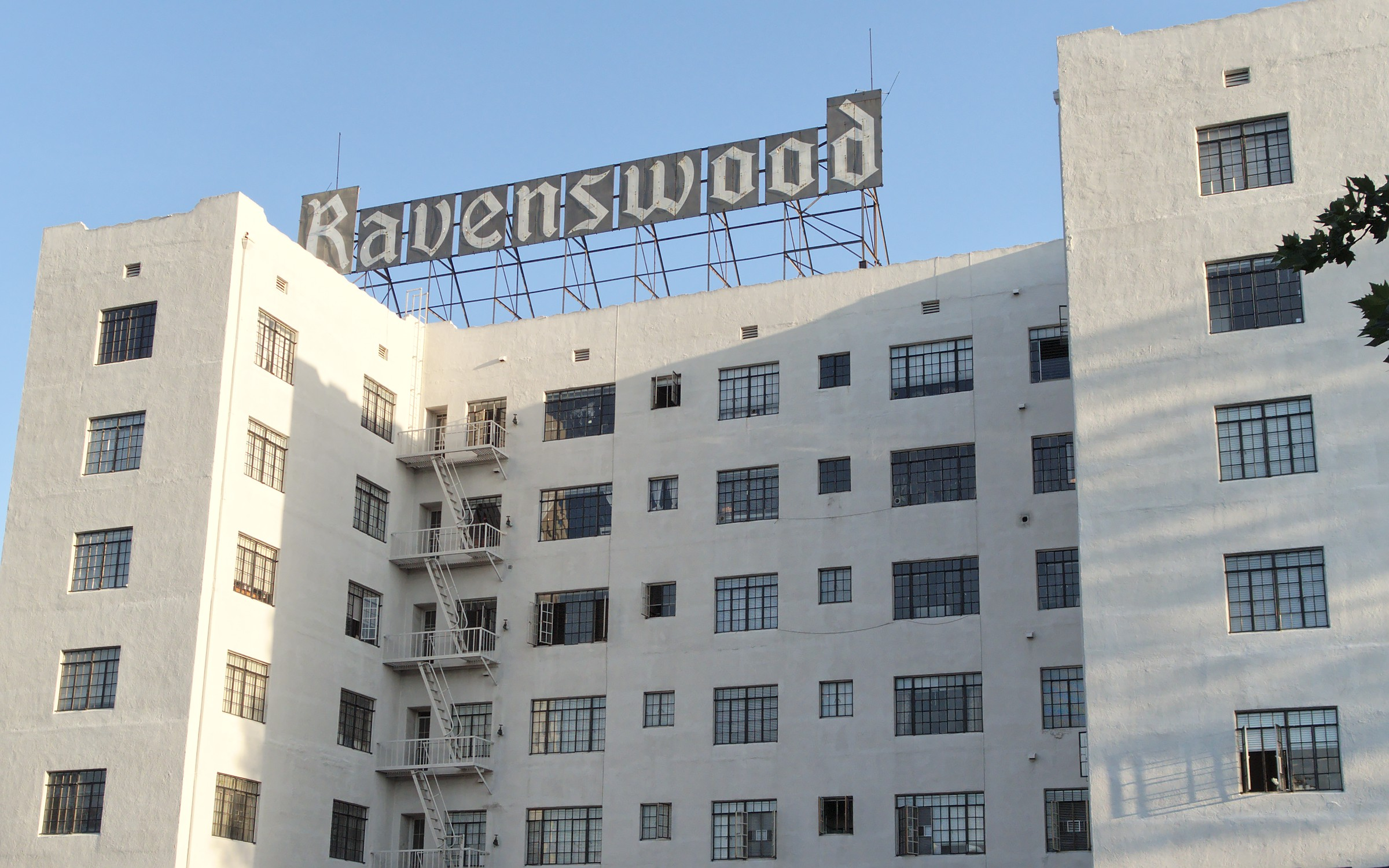

- Location within the Los Angeles metropolitan area
- 34.081069°N 118.326985°W
- Location: 570 N. Rossmore Ave.

History
- Built: 1930

Site notes
- Architect: Max Maltzman
- Architectural style: Art Deco

Los Angeles Historic-Cultural Monument
- Designated: November 2003
- Reference no.: 768

The Ravenswood is a historic apartment building in Art Deco style at 570 North Rossmore Avenue in the Hancock Park neighborhood of Los Angeles, California. It was designed by Max Maltzman, and built by Paramount Pictures in 1930 just five blocks from the corner of Paramount's studios on Melrose Avenue.

Mae West lived in the penthouse from its 1930 opening until her 1980 death. West, who invested in property throughout the Los Angeles area, saved the building's owners from bankruptcy which changed their initial intention of barring her then-boyfriend, African-American boxer William "Gorilla" Jones, from entering the premises. James Timony, West's long time manager, close friend, and one-time boyfriend (pre-1930s), lived in the building until his death in 1954. Other residents have included Anna Faris, Clark Gable and Ava Gardner, at different times.

The Ravenswood was designated a Los Angeles Historic-Cultural Monument in 2003.

== See also ==
- List of Los Angeles Historic-Cultural Monuments in the Wilshire and Westlake areas
