= Charmont Apartments =

Historic building in Santa Monica, California, US

- U.S. National Register of Historic Places
- Santa Monica Historic Landmark
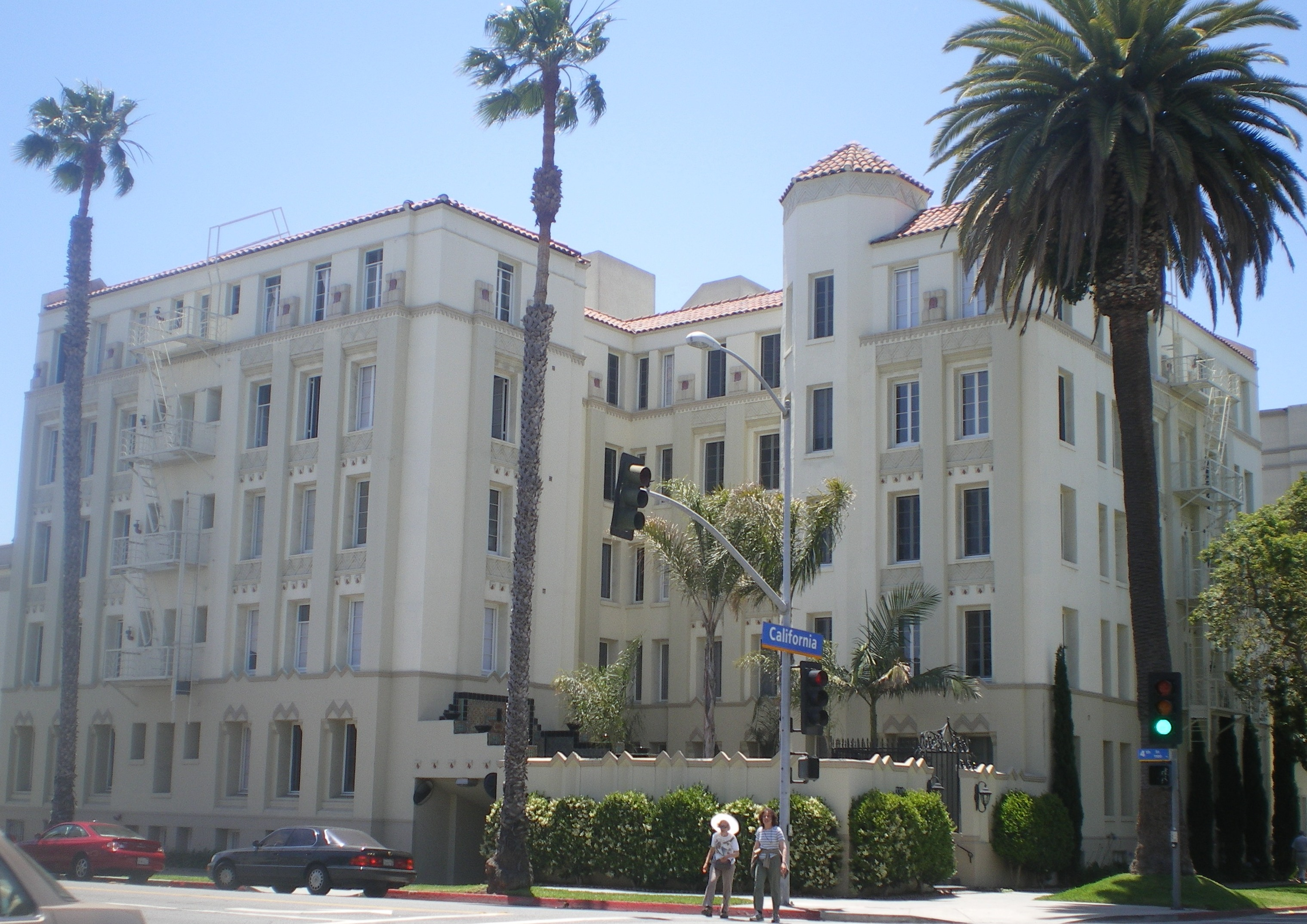
- Charmont Apartments, 2008

- Location within the Los Angeles metropolitan area Location within California Location within the United States
- Location: Santa Monica, California
- Coordinates: 34°1′12″N 118°29′58″W
- Built: 1929
- Architect: Maltzman, Max; Fergangaum, William
- Architectural style: Mission Revival-Spanish Colonial Revival, Art Deco.
- NRHP reference No.: 96000777
- SMHL No.: 29

Significant dates
- Added to NRHP: July 25, 1996
- Designated SMHL: November 10, 1994

Charmont Apartments is an historic five-story apartment building in Santa Monica, California, which was built in 1928. Designed by architect Max Maltzman with elements of both the Mission Revival-Spanish Colonial Revival style and the Art Deco style, the Charmont was a luxurious high-rise when it was built. The blending of Spanish Colonial Revival and Art Deco elements was popular style in the 1920s and is sometimes known as "Med-Deco." The main entrance is located in a walled courtyard that features a two-tiered fountain with an intricate Moorish-patterned backsplash in polychrome tile.

The Charmont combines Spanish Colonial Revival and Art Deco/Moderne architecture. The Moderne elements include stylized geometric motifs and extensive use of chevron motifs. Spanish Colonial elements include the courtyard plan, massing, smooth stucco walls, clay tile roofs, and fountain.

The building was damaged in the 1994 Northridge earthquake and subsequently rehabilitated and listed on the National Register of Historic Places.

== See also ==
- List of Registered Historic Places in Los Angeles County, California
