= Los Angeles Nurses' Club =

- U.S. National Register of Historic Places
- Los Angeles Historic-Cultural Monument
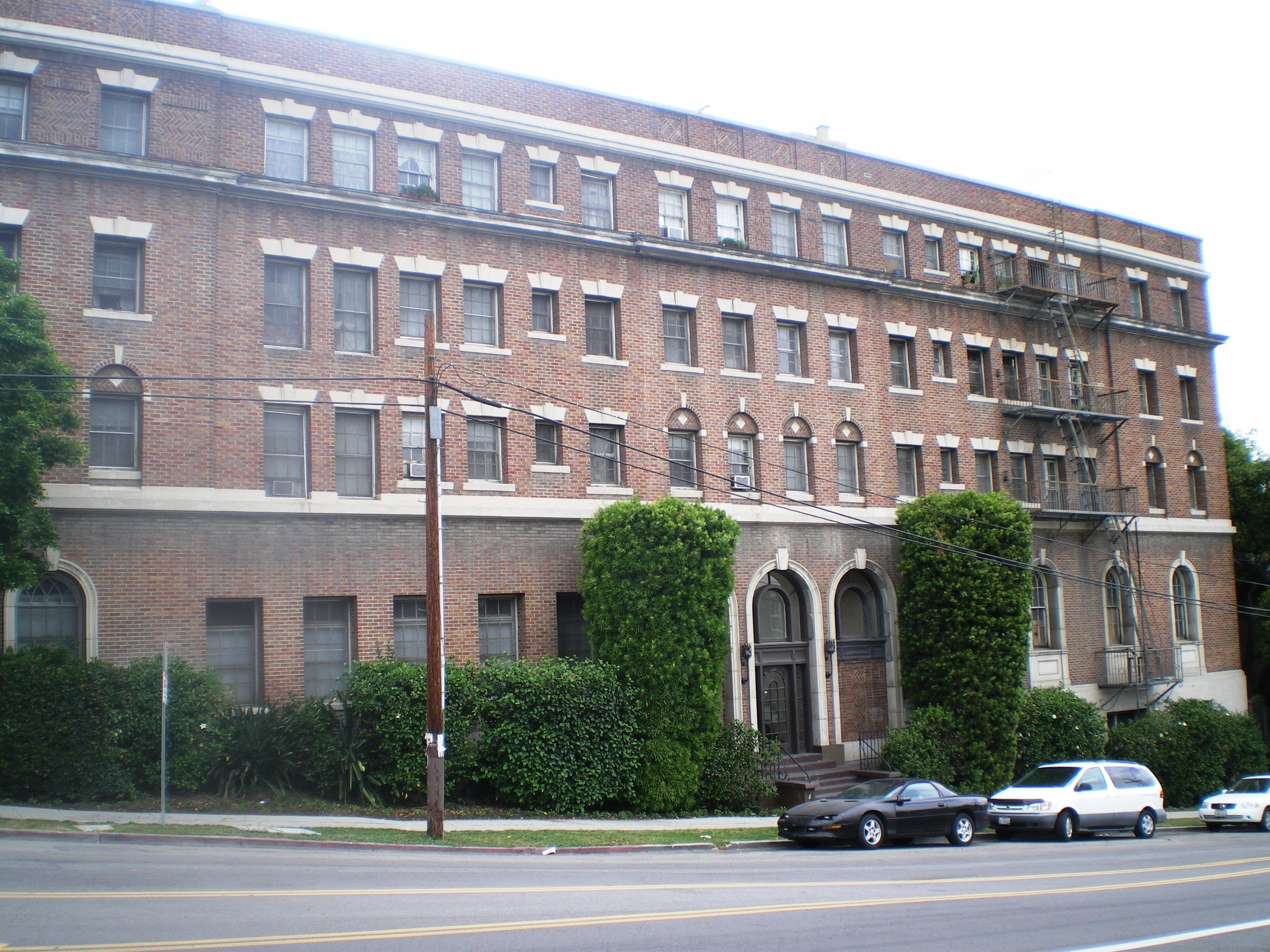
- Los Angeles Nurses' Club, 2008

- Location within the Los Angeles metropolitan area Location within California Location within the United States
- Location: 245 South Lucas Avenue, Westlake district, Los Angeles, California
- Coordinates: 34.059659°N 118.260757°W
- Built: 1924
- Architect: Frauenfelder, John J.
- Architectural style: Late 19th And 20th Century Revivals
- NRHP reference No.: 95000581
- LAHCM No.: 352

Significant dates
- Added to NRHP: May 11, 1995
- Designated LAHCM: 1988-04-08

Los Angeles Nurses' Club is a clubhouse and apartment building for nurses located in the Westlake district of Central Los Angeles, California.

== History ==
The large building was built in 1924 by the Los Angeles Nurses' Club. The club was organized and incorporated as a non-profit corporation in 1921.

The club's members conducted several bazaars, some theatre parties, and a dance, raising funds to buy a lot, which they then sold for a profit. By 1923, the club had raised sufficient funds to purchase a hilltop lot at the corner of Third Street and Lucas Street, west of Downtown Los Angeles in the Westlake district.

The clubhouse was intended to provide a place "where registered nurses may live and enjoy the few quiet hours spared from their arduous duties."

=== Building ===
Architect John J. Frauenfelder was hired to design the building. Frauenfelder designed a structure consisting of four stories and a basement. The ground floor had a large living room with a library and fireplace, which was intended to lend a "home-like atmosphere to the clubhouse." Frauenfelder's plans also included an auditorium for lectures and motion pictures. A garden was built at the rear of the building with views of the mountains. The structure included housing for 100 nurses and was also the headquarters of the group's professional activities, including the city's Central Registry for nurses.

When completed in 1924, the building was the first clubhouse in the United States to be entirely financed and built by and for nurses. The cost of building the structure was $160,000. The "Angelus Sextette", composed of nurses from the Angelus Hospital, sang at the dedication ceremony in 1924.

== Landmark ==
The Los Angeles Nurses' Club building was designated a Los Angeles Historic-Cultural Monument by the Los Angeles Cultural Heritage Board in April 1988 (HCM #352). It was listed on the National Register of Historic Places in 1995.

== See also ==
- List of Los Angeles Historic-Cultural Monuments in the Wilshire and Westlake areas
- National Register of Historic Places listings in Los Angeles
