= Meinir Gwilym =

Welsh-language singer

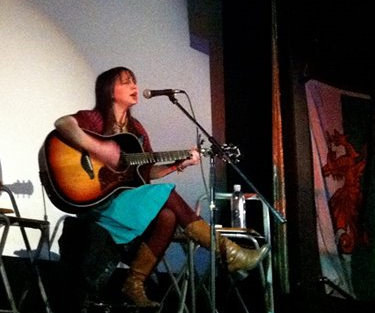
- Gwilym headlining the Los Angeles St. David's Day Festival, 2014

Background information
- Born: Meinir Elin Gwilym; 31 March 1983 (age 43)
- Origin: Llangristiolus, Wales
- Genres: Folk; pop
- Occupation: Singer
- Instruments: Vocals; acoustic guitar
- Years active: 2002–present
- Website: meinirgwilym.com

Meinir Elin Gwilym (born 31 March 1983) is a Welsh-language pop and folk singer. Raised in Llangristiolus, Anglesey, she released her first EP, "Smôcs, Coffi a Fodca Rhad" in 2002. Her website claims that she is amongst the best-selling Welsh language musicians in history.

Gwilym worked as a radio presenter on the afternoon request show for Radio Cymru, the BBC's Welsh-language service, alongside Dylan Wyn. She now works on S4C's nightly magazine show Wedi 7, and presents weekend shows on Heart Cymru in Anglesey and Gwynedd.

== Childhood ==
Meinir Gwilym was born in Wales in 1983, and educated at Ysgol Henblas in Llangristiolus, and later, Ysgol Gyfun in Llangefni. Gwilym comes from a musical family, with a grandfather who played the piano, her other grandfather who wrote lyrics, and a mother and sister who are fond of singing. She competed in the Urdd Eisteddfod as a child, and began writing songs around the age of fourteen.

Gwilym completed a degree in Welsh Literature and Philosophy in July 2004 at Bangor University. She had begun her degree at Cardiff University, but the last twelve months were completed at Bangor.

== Career ==
Gwilym released her first EP, Smôcs, Coffi a Fodca Rhad ("Smokes, Coffee and Cheap Vodka") in 2002. In the same year, she signed on to the Welsh record label Gwynfryn Cymunedol, and won Composer of the Year and Best Female Artist at the BBC Radio Cymru Rock and Pop awards. She released her first album, Dim Ond Clwydda (English: Nothing But Lies) in November 2003, and following the success of this release, she came under the sponsorship of Yamaha in 2004. On 1 March 2014, Gwilym made her North American debut headlining the Los Angeles St. David's Day Festival.

== Television and radio ==
Gwilym worked as a radio presenter on the afternoon request show for Radio Cymru, the BBC's Welsh-language service, alongside Dylan Wyn. for a period of three years. She currently presents weekend shows on Heart Cymru in Anglesey and Gwynedd.

She has also made many television appearances, particularly on the Welsh-language channel S4C. In 2005, Blwyddyn Meinir Gwilym (English: Meinir Gwilym's Year), a one-hour documentary that followed Meinir's steps for an entire year was broadcast. Most recently, she has been hosting a music programme on S4C, Noson Chis a Meinir (English: Chis and Meinir's Night) alongside Huw Chiswell. Since January 2009 she has worked on S4C's nightly magazine show Wedi 7. She is also a presenter on the S4C gardening show, Garddio a mwy.

== Discography ==
- Caneuon Tyn Yr Hendy (2023)
- Smôcs, Coffi a Fodca Rhad (Yn 20 Oed) (2022) Re-release with re-recordings as well as remixes
- Llwybrau (2016)
- Sworn Protector / Rho I Mi (2014) released in aid of The Gentle Barn Los Angeles and Freshfields Animal Sanctuary Wales
- Celt (2014) US debut
- Tombola (2008)
- Sgandal Fain (2005)
- Dim Ond Clwydda (2003)
- Smôcs, Coffi a Fodca Rhad (2002)
