= Firestone Tire and Service Center =

Los Angeles Streamline Moderne building

Coordinates: 34.0603°N 118.3444°W

- Location: 800 S. La Brea Ave., Los Angeles, California, United States, 90036

Los Angeles Historic-Cultural Monument
- Designated: 2012
- Reference no.: 1020

The Firestone Tire and Service Center building at 800 South La Brea Avenue in the Sycamore Square section of the Miracle Mile district of Los Angeles, California, is a significant example of the Streamline Moderne style of architecture. Streamline style, "with its low horizontal lines and curved edges, often associated with motion and the machine," was a good fit for marketing to automobile consumers. The building was built in 1937 for the Firestone Company and was in continuous active use as a tire center until the 2010s. According to local architectural historians, the building, located at the corner of La Brea and 8th Street, is "covered in mustard-colored rectangular sheets of pre-fabricated porcelain-covered steel...This is topped with (painted) red accents of porcelain steel in curvaceous and banding rhythms that wrap around the building." Engineer R.E. Ward designed the building which cost about $30,000 to build. Firestone Tire was designated as Los Angeles Historic-Cultural Monument No. 1020 in 2012. The tire business closed in 2015, and the building housed a taqueria as of 2021.

== See also ==
- List of Los Angeles Historic-Cultural Monuments in the Wilshire and Westlake areas
- List of Art Deco architecture in California
