= Welsh Presbyterian Church (Los Angeles) =

Los Angeles Historic-Cultural Monument

Coordinates: 34.0457°N 118.2743°W

Welsh Presbyterian Church was a bilingual Welsh/English congregation in the Pico-Union neighborhood of Los Angeles, California, founded in 1888 and dissolved in 2012.

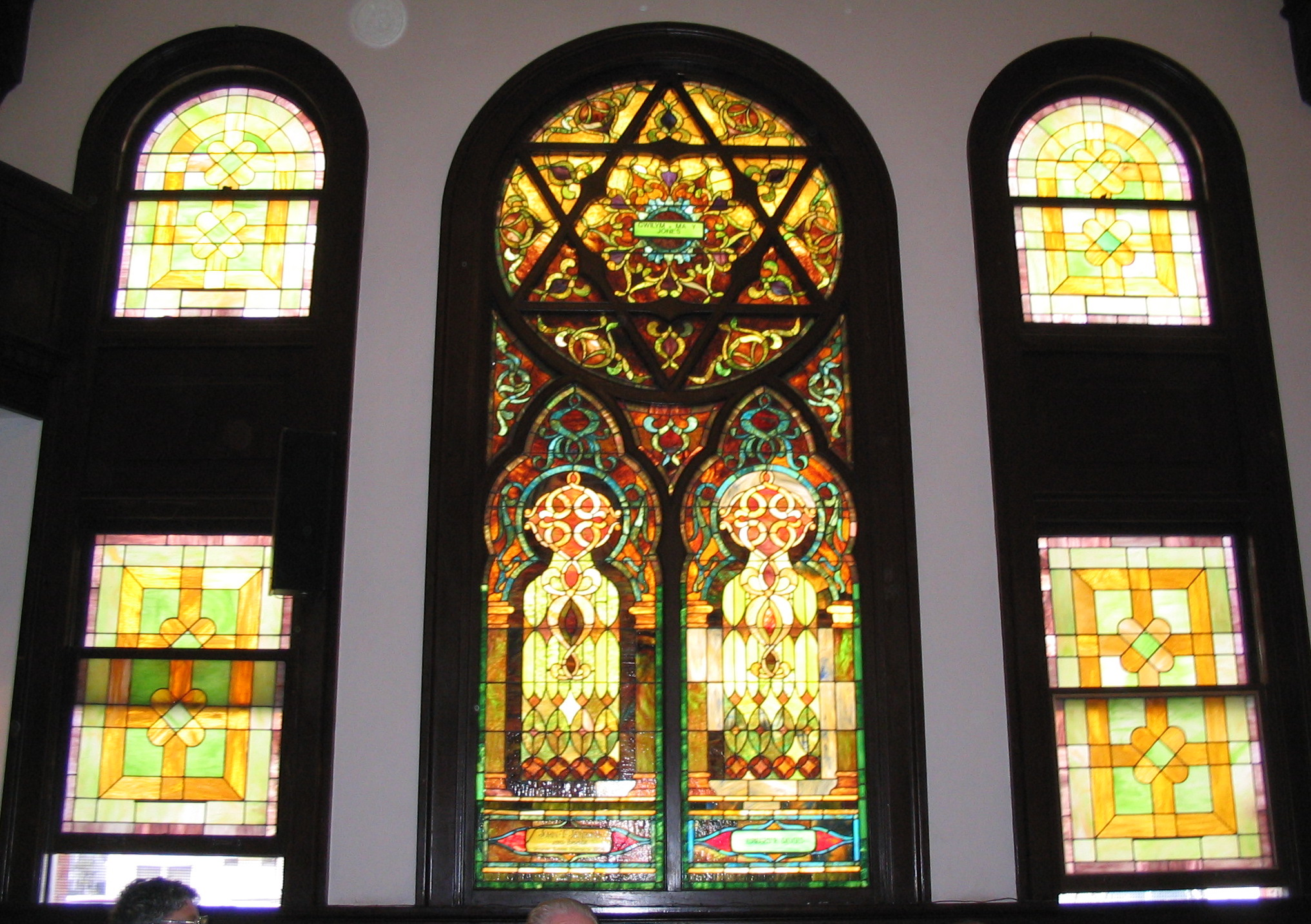
Stained glass windows, including distinctive Star of David round window, at Welsh Presbyterian Church (Los Angeles) in 2007.

== History ==
The Welsh Church in Los Angeles was founded in 1888 by Rev. David Hughes (1833–1903). Hughes, born in Wales, founded two separate congregations in the city, preaching English sermons to one, and Welsh sermons to the other, every Sunday. Rev. E. L. Jones of Denver was installed as pastor in 1910, when the church was meeting at 438 Crocker Street, and holding weekly Sunday services in Welsh and English. In 1926, the Welsh Church moved into a building at 1153 Valencia Street, once occupied by the conservative Jewish congregation still known as Sinai Temple.

In the 1980s, despite limited resources, the congregation undertook seismic retrofitting of the church building, rather than allow it to be demolished as unsafe.

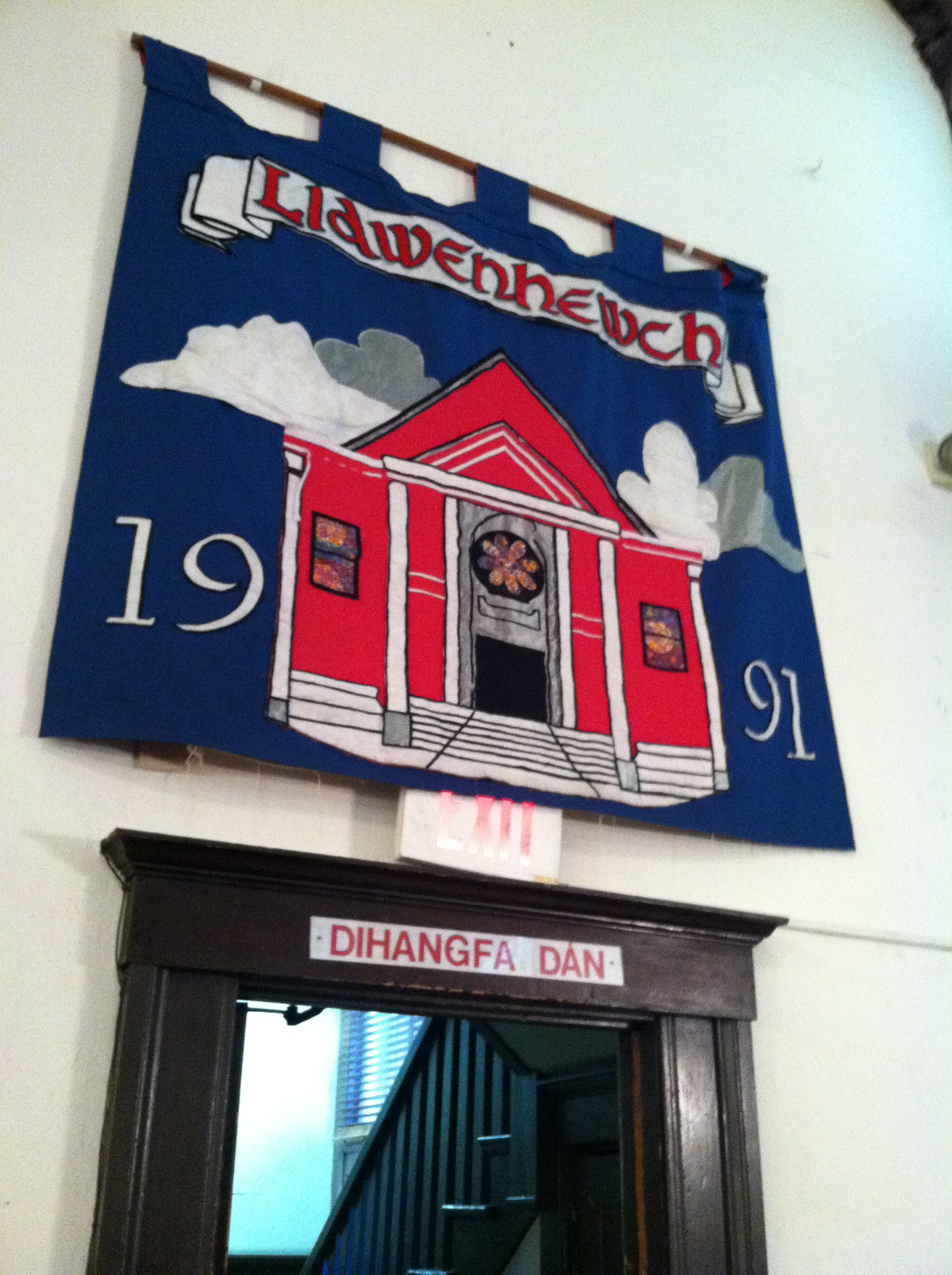
Banner and signage in Welsh at the Welsh Presbyterian Church (Los Angeles) in 2011.

In 2012, the church's congregation had dwindled to about ten active members. It continued to hold Welsh-language worship services, concerts, and cultural events into its last years, but had not had a full-time pastor since 1964. The Welsh Presbyterian Church was dissolved as a church in December 2012. The building was sold again, to Craig Taubman, and now is home to the multifaith Pico Union Project.

Between 2014 and 2016 the church was used by the Welsh League of Southern California for their Gymanfa Ganu events.

== Building ==
The Welsh Church building was built in the Greek Revival style in 1909, and is the oldest remaining synagogue building in Los Angeles. It has been recognized as a Historic-Cultural Monument by the Los Angeles Cultural Heritage Commission, and contains a historic pipe organ build by Murray M. Harris in 1909.

== In popular culture ==
Members of the Welsh Presbyterian Church in Los Angeles were recruited to appear and sing in the 1941 film adaptation of How Green Was My Valley.
