= Los Angeles St. David's Day Festival =

2011–2017 annual festival in California

Coordinates: 34.1864°N 118.3726°W

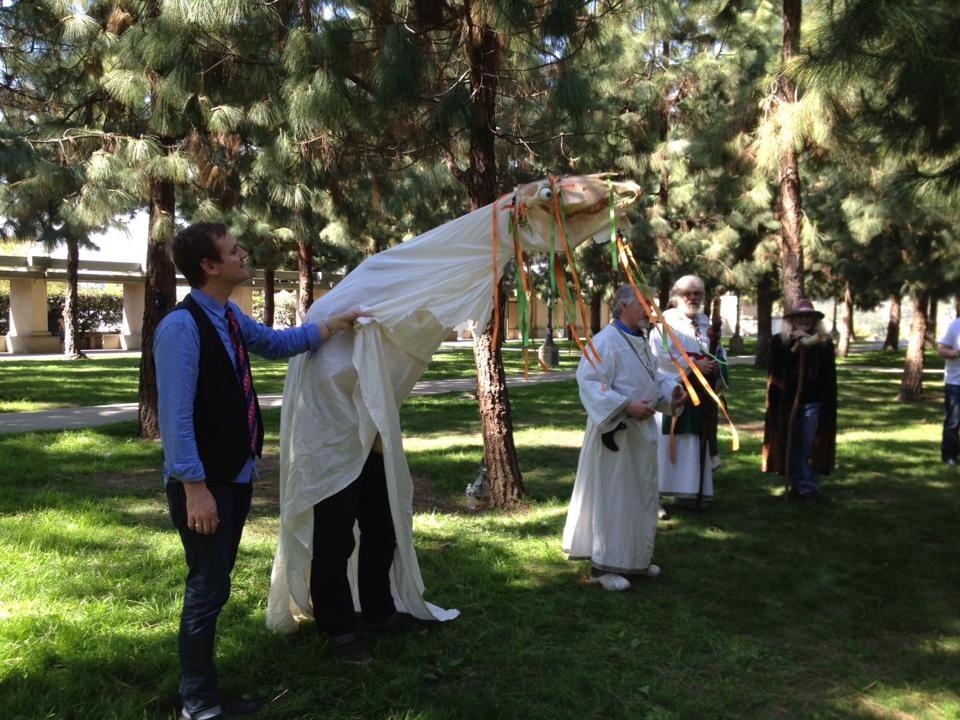
- Dates: First weekend in March
- Locations: Los Angeles, California
- Years active: 2011–2017

The Los Angeles St. David's Day Festival was an annual arts and cultural festival held in Los Angeles, California. It typically took place during the first weekend of March, and attracted Welsh ex-pats and Welsh descendants from all over the United States.

== St. David's Day Festivals in Los Angeles ==
=== History ===
Since 1890, St. David's Day has been observed by Welsh immigrants and their descendants in the Los Angeles area, with concerts and banquets. The Cambrian Society of Long Beach and the Welsh Presbyterian Church of Los Angeles celebrated the day. The Welsh Choir of Southern California held Festivals of Welsh Music for St. David's Day, at the First Congregational Church of Los Angeles in 1999 and 2004, in Palos Verdes Estates in 2000, in Woodland Hills and Pasadena in 2001, and in Santa Monica in 2003.

=== The Los Angeles St. David's Day Festival (2011–2017) ===
The Los Angeles St. David's Day Festival began in 2011 and was one of the largest Welsh festivals in America for several years. Headlining acts included Siobhan Owen, Meinir Gwilym, and Poxy Boggards.. Activities included Welsh and other Celtic music, genealogy, food and drink, Welsh language classes, cultural exhibits, Welsh authors, crafts, and children's activities. The 2013 event was held at Barnsdall Art Park; the short documentary Do Ye the Little Things in Life: St. David's Day Festival-National Day of Wales 2013, directed by Lorin Morgan-Richards, captured this celebration. The Festival was held at the Cinefamily theater in 2014, and at the Mayflower Club in North Hollywood in 2015 and 2016.
