= One Hundred Sycamore =

Los Angeles Historic-Cultural Monument

Coordinates: 34°4′25.6″N 118°20′33.8″W

One Hundred Sycamore is a building located at 100 North Sycamore Avenue in Los Angeles, California.

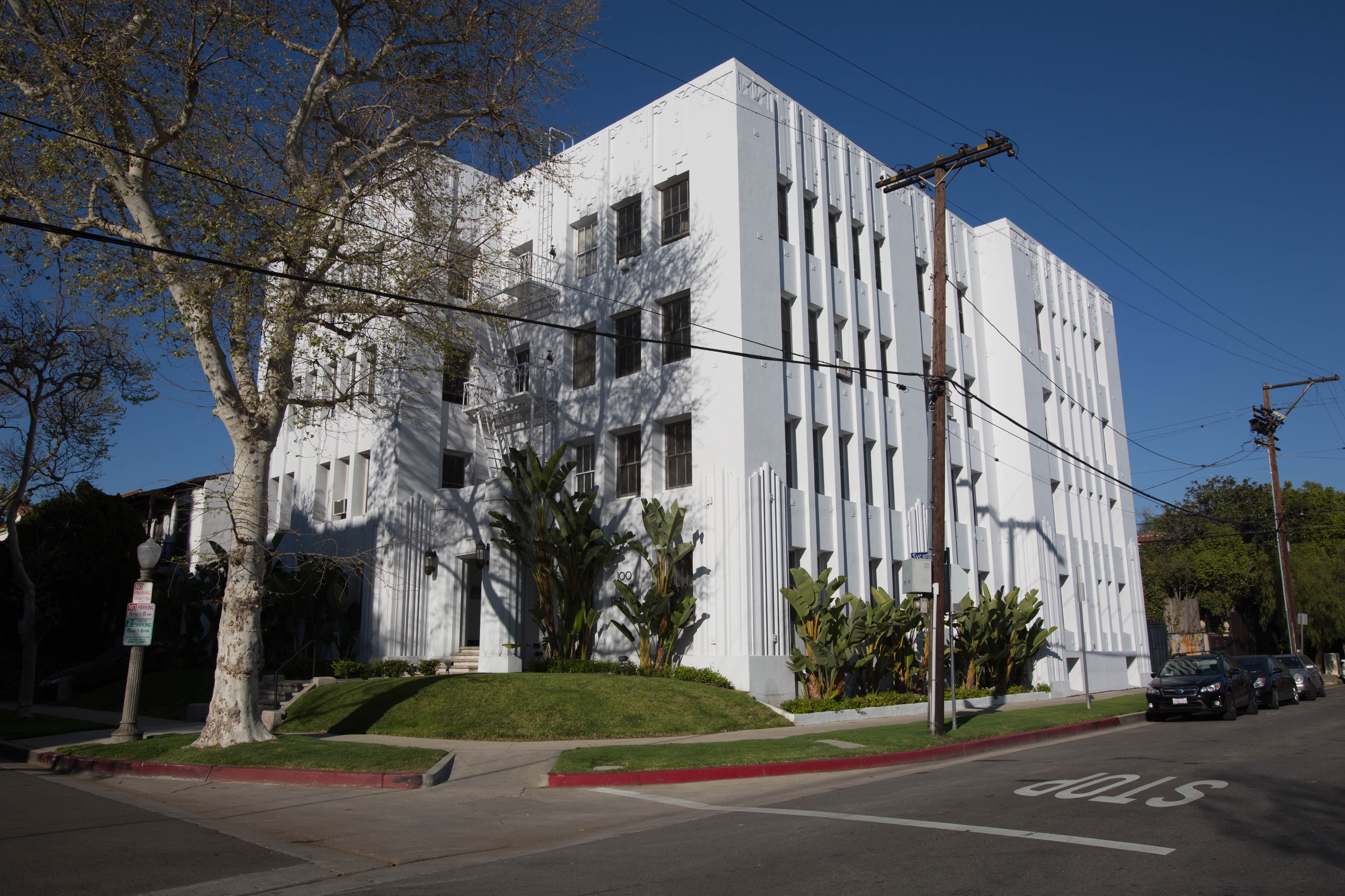
One Hundred Sycamore displays common elements of the Art Deco style.

== Physical Characteristics ==
Built in 1929, the building exhibits character-defining features of Art Deco architecture including smooth surfaces with windows arranged in sunken vertical panels, flat roofs with parapets, and zigzag ornamentation, as evidenced by the attached photo exhibit. Historic building materials and character-defining design elements are generally extant.

From Charles J. Fisher's petition for implementation as a building of Historical Significance:

This brick and stucco apartment building is an excellent intact example of the Art Deco style that was built in Los Angeles during the late 1920s thru the beginning of WWII. The structure exhibits a high degree of integrity both interior and exterior. The original owner Charles R. Miller appears to have been a local developer. He is listed as the contractor on the permit, even though the Arthur C. Wright Company was a design-build firm. Arthur C. Wright had a construction business in Southern California from 1922 until his death in 1977.

The One Hundred North Sycamore Building displays a high degree of integrity in its design and is a fine well maintained building that gives a solid reference to its time and place. Although most previous owners do not seem historically significant, one exception is Sonia Suk, who was on title from 1970 until 1997. Suk was one of the main founders of the Korea Town community in Los Angeles and for many years held a prominent position in the local Korean American business community. It was during Suk's ownership that the building was brought up to code on both Section 88 Seismic Requirements and the Dorothy Mae Fire Requirements. The work was done in such a manner that it retained the architectural integrity of the building.
