= Salisbury Manor =

Historic house in New York, United States

- U.S. National Register of Historic Places
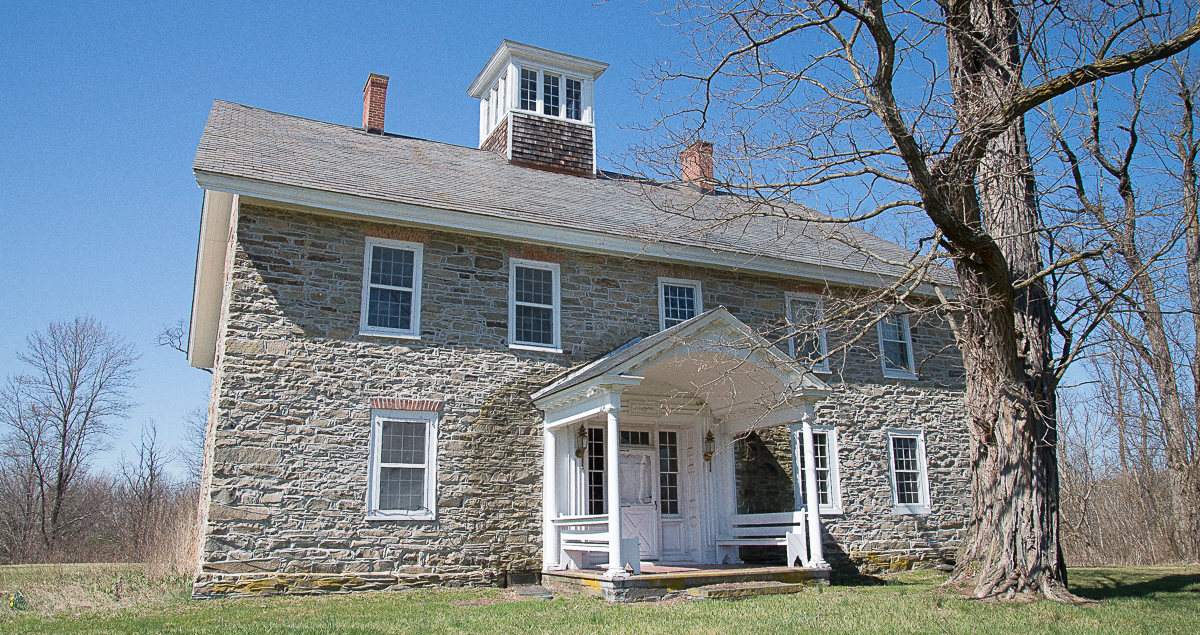

- Location within New York Location within the United States
- Location: Northwest of Leeds on NY 145, Leeds, New York
- Coordinates: 42°15′47″N 73°55′10″W
- Area: 47 acres (19 ha)
- Built: 1730
- Architect: Salisbury, Francis
- Architectural style: Mixed (more Than 2 Styles From Different Periods)
- NRHP reference No.: 79001585
- Added to NRHP: June 19, 1979

Salisbury Manor is an historic 1730 farmhouse near Leeds, Greene County, New York.

The house was built by Francis Salisbury for his oldest son Abraham. The house was expanded in 1760 and 1823, leading to a mix of architectural styles.

The building was added to the National Register of Historic Places in 1979 for its architectural significance and representation of colonial era settlement. It is privately owned.
