= Elizabeth Harrower (actress) =

American actress and television writer

- Harrower in 1965 on The Alfred Hitchcock Hour
- Born: Betty Louise Foss; May 28, 1918; Alameda, California, U.S.
- Died: December 10, 2003 (aged 85); Studio City, California
- Occupations: Actress; television writer
- Years active: 1949–1991
- Known for: Dennis the Menace; The Young and the Restless
- Spouse: Harry Seabold
- Children: Susan Seaforth Hayes

Elizabeth Louise Harrower (May 28, 1918 – December 10, 2003) was an American actress and television writer.

== Career ==
She found success in acting, including ten appearances on Dennis the Menace (mostly as Dennis' teacher, "Miss Perkins"), four appearances on Perry Mason (The Case of the Waylaid Wolf, The Case of the Lurid Letter), and two appearances on Gunsmoke as "Mrs. O'Roarke", among many other shows up until 1974. She appeared in such films as True Grit and The Sterile Cuckoo.

In the late 1970s, she served as head writer for the daytime soap opera Days of Our Lives, where her daughter Susan was a cast member. She also wrote for The Young and the Restless in the 1980s and early 1990s. Her last writing stint was on the short-lived soap Generations in 1991. In 2003, Harrower played a drunken con artist, Charlotte Ramsey, on The Young and the Restless.

== Personal life and death ==
Elizabeth Harrowers roots are in the Kopp family from Germany, which hails from Oberemmel, a district of Konz (near Trier) in the German state of Rhineland-Palatinate. For many years, she and her mother lived in the Alvarado Terrace Historic District of Los Angeles In 1942, Harrower married Harry Seabold, an Air Force cadet whom she had met in fifth grade. Their daughter, actress Susan Seaforth Hayes, was born in 1943. The marriage ended in divorce. For many years, she and her daughter lived in the Alvarado Terrace Historic District of Los Angeles, where she was active with the Pico-Union community redevelopment project advisory committee.

Harrower died of cancer at age 85 in 2003 in Studio City, California.

== Selected filmography ==
Year	Title	Role	Notes
1949	The Pilgrimage Play	Woman of Samaria	
1952	Plymouth Adventure	Elizabeth Hopkins	Uncredited
1954	Thunder Pass	Mrs. Hemp	
1958	Teacher's Pet	Clara Dibney	Uncredited
1958	Marjorie Morningstar	Miss Kimble	Uncredited
1959	Al Capone	Proprietress	Uncredited
1959	The FBI Story	Clerk	Uncredited
1960	I Passed for White	Minor Role	Uncredited
1962	Four Horsemen of the Apocalypse	French Prisoner	Uncredited
1962	House of Women	Mrs. Potter	Uncredited
1962	Don't Knock the Twist	Ruth Emerson	
1962	The Wild Westerners	Martha Bernard	
1964	The Alfred Hitchcock Hour	Mrs. Masters	Season 2 Episode 15: "Night Caller"
1965	The Alfred Hitchcock Hour	Mrs. Jones	Season 3 Episode 19: "Wally the Beard"
1965	Zebra in the Kitchen	Town Gossip	Uncredited
1965	Cat Ballou	Minor Role	Uncredited
1966	Batman	Picnicking Woman	Uncredited
1969	True Grit	Mrs. Ross	
1969	The Sterile Cuckoo	Landlady	Uncredited
1971	Escape from the Planet of the Apes	Reporter at Hotel	Uncredited
1971	Shoot Out	Housekeeper	Uncredited
1974	I Love You... Good-bye	Mrs. Freeman	TV movie
