= Wilshire United Methodist Church =

Place of Methodist worship in Los Angeles, California

Coordinates: 34°3′41″N 118°19′24″W

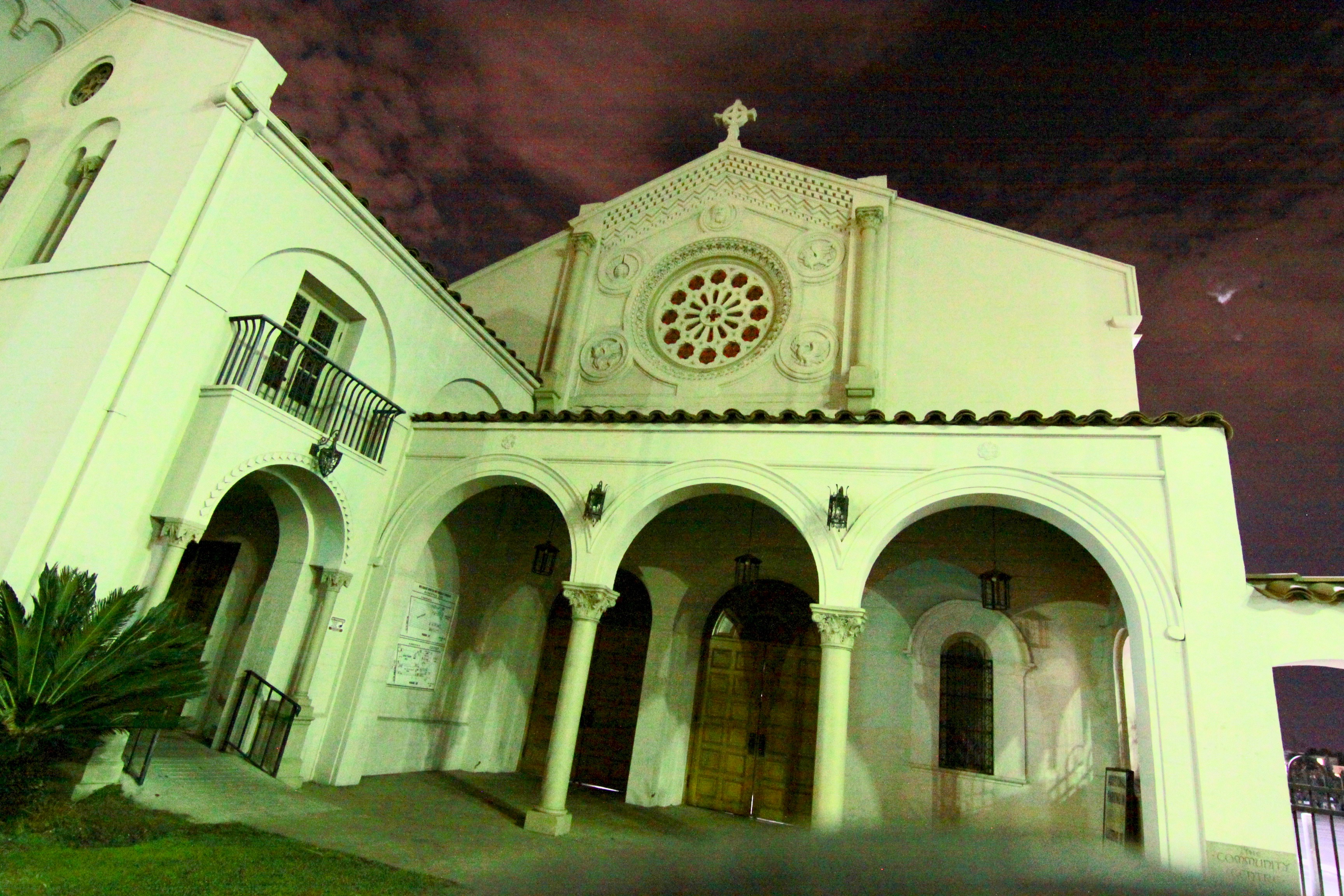
- Industry: Methodist church
- Founded: 1924
- Headquarters: 4350 Wilshire Blvd., Los Angeles, California, U.S.
- Website: wilshireumcmem.org

Wilshire United Methodist Church is a Methodist church located at 4350 Wilshire Blvd., Los Angeles, CA. It was built in 1924. It is Los Angeles Historic-Cultural Monument No. 114.

== History ==
Designed by Allison and Allison, the Wilshire United Methodist Church is rendered in the Gothic Revival and Romanesque Revival styles. It includes a 144-foot tower in the style of the Moorish La Giralda in Seville, Spain, a thirteenth-century campanile, and seats 1,000.

The church began as a Congregational parish but became Methodist in 1931. In its early years, Frank Dyer, the church's founding pastor, created controversy by holding a jazz concert in the sanctuary and by staging a church fundraiser at the Olympic Auditorium that was to include prizefighter Jack Dempsey.

The church hosted the weddings of Jeannette MacDonald (1937) and Shirley Temple (1945).

In 1994, the building was set on fire by an arsonist, causing nearly five million dollars in damage, including a destroyed pipe organ. It took 15 fire companies an hour to extinguish the blaze. While the church was being restored, services were held at the Scottish Rite Masonic Temple across the street. The church was fully restored in 1995.

The church provides services in English, Korean, Spanish, and Tagalog, and is welcoming of the LGBTQ+ community. Angel City Chorale performs at the church. Community groups such as the Gay Men's Chorus of Los Angeles, Cub Scouts, and Alcoholics Anonymous have all used the church as a meeting place.

== Gallery ==
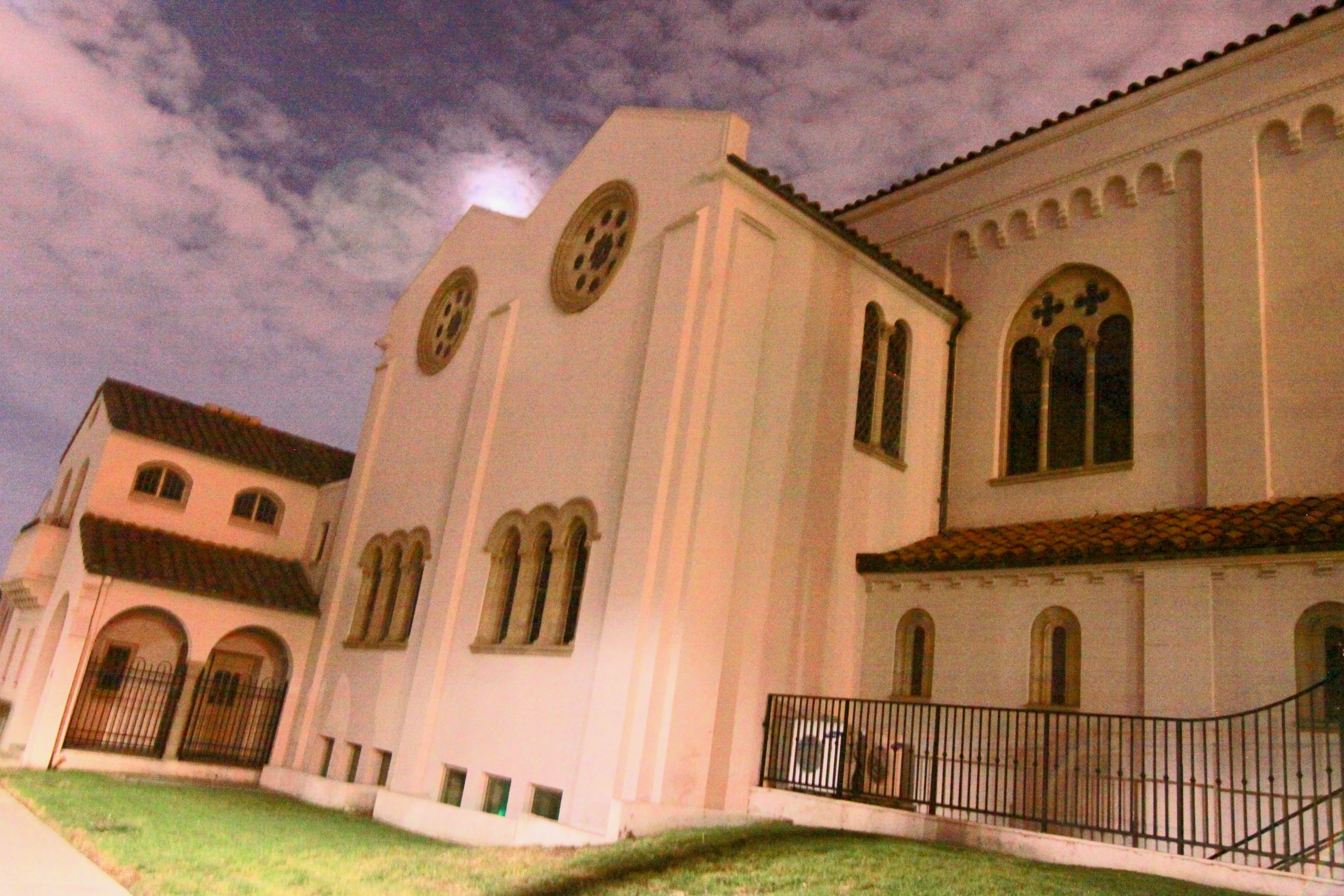

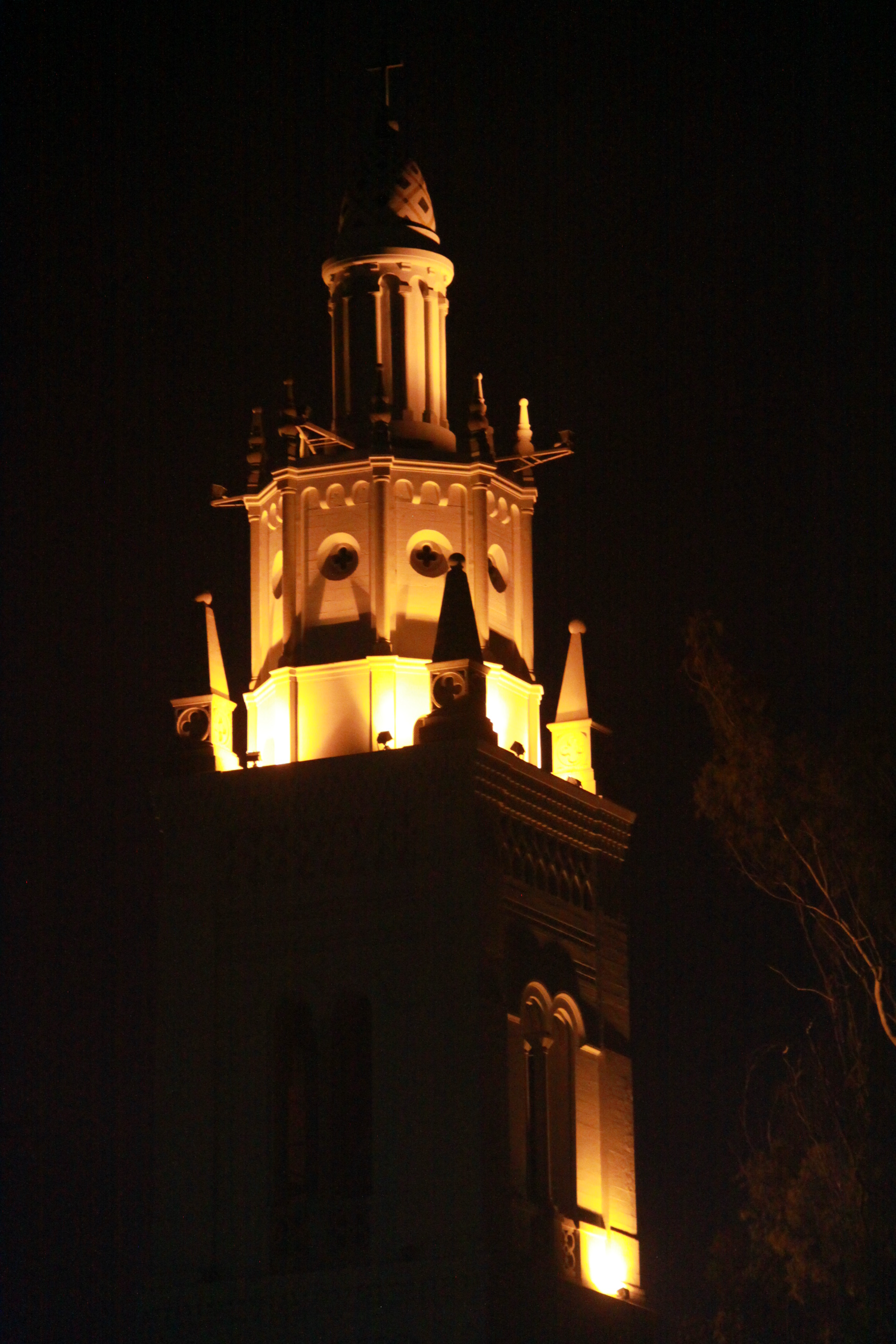
