= West Boulevard Bridge, Los Angeles =

West Boulevard Bridge
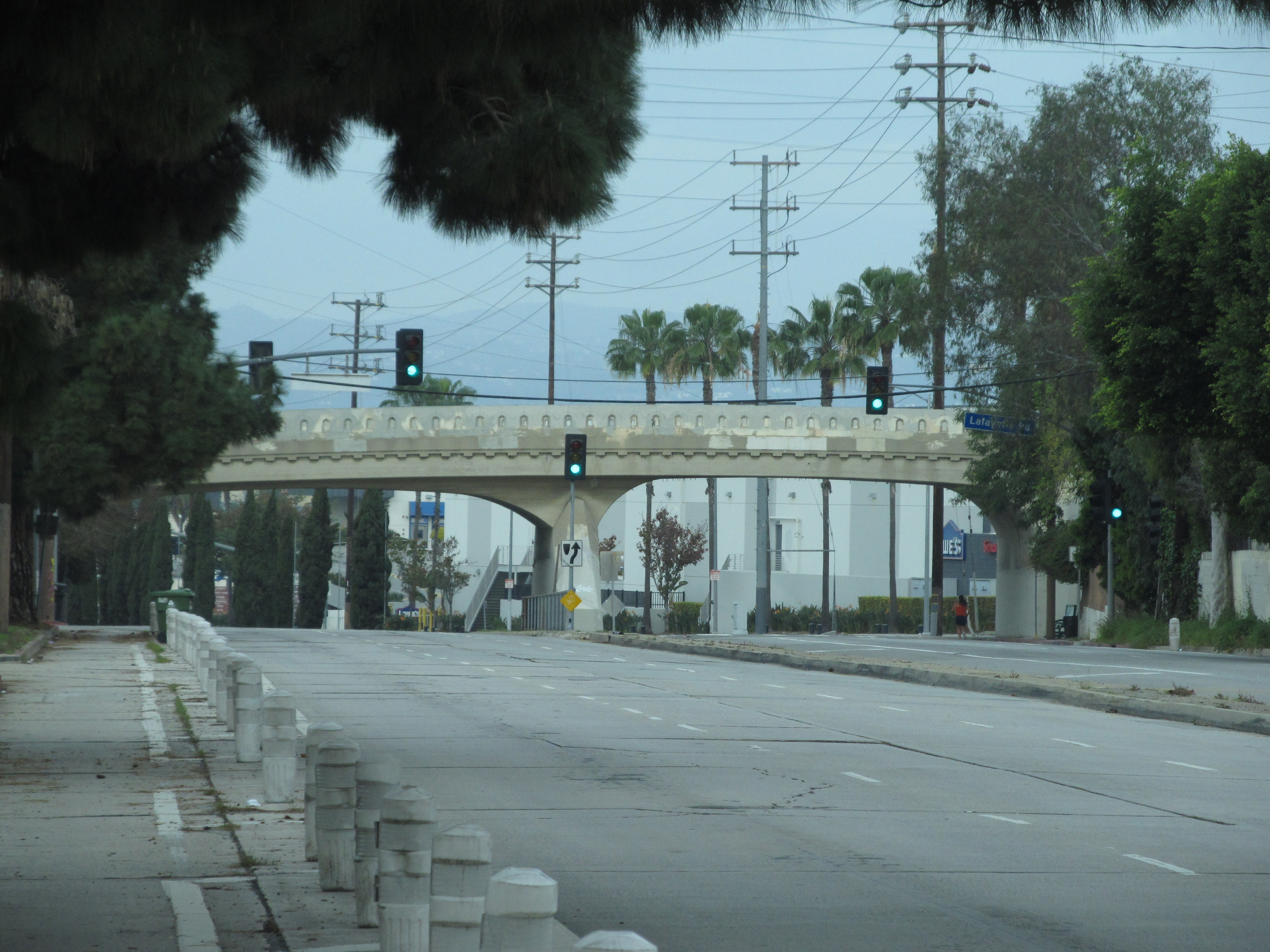
- West Boulevard Bridge, 2026

- Location within Los Angeles
- 34°02′47.8″N 118°20′04.0″W
- Location: Crossing Venice Boulevard between 16th Place and Victoria Park Drive, Mid- City, Los Angeles

History
- Built: 1933

Site notes
- Architect: Los Angeles Department of Engineering
- Architectural style: Art Deco

Los Angeles Historic-Cultural Monument
- Designated: October 4, 2012
- Reference no.: 1023

The West Boulevard Bridge is Los Angeles Historic-Cultural Monument No. 1023. Located in Mid-City, it is a Art Deco bridge featuring a double-arch span with a closed spandrel element, three pillars and round fluted ornamental light posts.

== Geography ==
Just south of Pico Boulevard, the bridge crosses Venice Boulevard between 16th Place and Victoria Park Drive. It is adjacent to the neighborhoods of Lafayette Square and Victoria Park and marks the western entry to the West Adams district.

== History ==
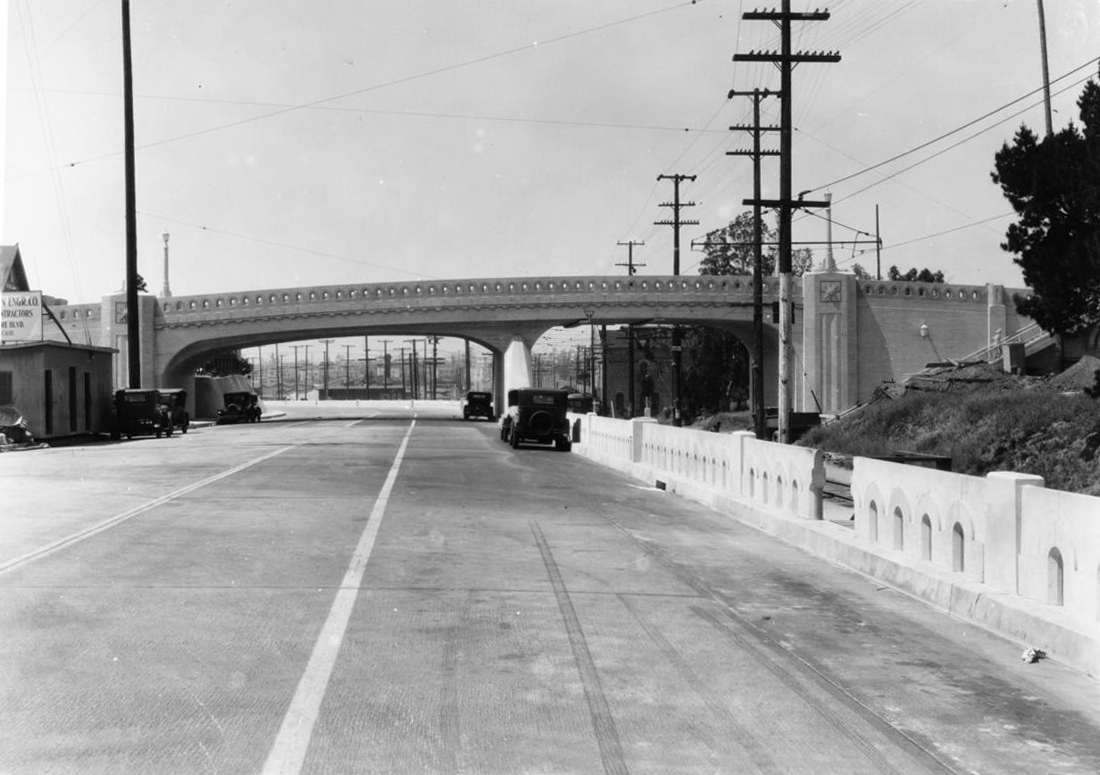
West facing view of The West Boulevard bridge, 1930s. Automobiles traveled through the arch on the left; Pacific Electric trains traveled on the right.

On July 13, 1913, there was a Pacific Electric train accident at Vineyard Junction, a stop on the Venice Short Line located a block west of West Boulevard. Fifteen people were killed and hundreds were injured. On July 27, 1913, the State Railroad Commission decided to forbid grade crossings from that point on in the city of Los Angeles and on August 1, the State Railroad Commission started hearings to abolish grade crossings throughout the state.

In 1916, the city engineer was ordered by the city to prepare assessment maps for a viaduct to cross over the Pacific Electric train tracks that ran along Sixteenth Street (present-day Venice Boulevard). It was estimated that the bridge would cost $15,000 and Pacific Electric would pay for half the cost.

In 1918, Pacific Electric presented the city with an easement over its right-of-way to permit the bridge construction. The contract to build the bridge was awarded in 1919 for $27,777. The Los Angeles Times noted that the bridge was of special concern to residents living in Lafayette Square as it would "afford a safe route" to Los Angeles High School, which opened in 1917. In July 1920, the Times reported that the bridge was almost finished.

The following decade, the wooden bridge was replaced with the present-day Art Deco concrete bridge. The construction contract for the replacement bridge was awarded July 6, 1932, for $59,986.75. On March 27, 1933, the Los Angeles Times reported that the new bridge was completed and would be open for traffic in mid-April of that year.

The West Adams Heritage Association and Mid City Neighborhood Council (MINC) worked to have the city designate the bridge as a Los Angeles Historic Cultural Monument. In 2013, the bridge was designated Los Angeles Historic-Cultural Monument No. 1023.

== Design ==
According to the summary in the city's recommendation report, the bridge is 525 feet in length and combines classical elements integrated with the Art Deco style.

"The bridge's span consists of a double-arch span with a minor, closed spandrel element. Three pillars support the viaduct with the center support dividing the Venice roadway below. Round fluted ornamental light posts surmount the bridge and sit on plinths decorated in a geometric, incised flower design. Small arched openings perforate the deck's balustrade. Denticulation and a slight zig-zag design extends over the length of the structure. Two staircases on the east side of the bridge display metal hand rails with an 'S-scroll' design. One east staircase, located near the center of the bridge also has three concrete corbels embellishing the underside of the stair treads."

== See also ==
- City of Los Angeles Monumental Bridges, 1900-1950
- Newswire L.A.(West Avenue Bridge)
- Original Wooden Bridge from the 1920s
