= Max Maltzman =

American architect

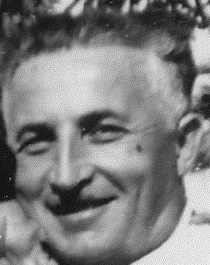
- Born: May 12, 1899; Mykolaiv, Russian Empire
- Died: August 15, 1971 (aged 72); Los Angeles, California
- Occupation: Architect
- Spouse: Sadye Seltzer (1906–1966)
- Children: 3
- Buildings: Charmont Apartments (1929); The Ravenswood (1930); Sahara Casino (1952-2011)

Max Maltzman (May 12, 1899 – August 15, 1971) was an American architect noted during the Art Deco era and one of the first Jewish architects to break into the mainstream. The design and looks of his buildings were widely emulated by his peers and successors in Los Angeles.

== Life ==
Max Maltzman was born in 1899 in Mykolaiv, Novorossiya, Russian Empire, now in Ukraine. His parents were Esther Maltzman and Abraham Maltzman, a carpenter. He had six siblings. The Maltzman family immigrated to Montreal, Quebec, Canada in 1909, but Max Maltzman moved to Chelsea, Massachusetts, U.S. in 1910. Following military service in World War I, Maltzman returned to Boston, where he began studying architecture. He married Russian native Sadye Seltzer (1906-1966) in 1921. Sadya was fifteen years old at the time of their marriage, while Max was 21 or 22. They had three children: Elliott (born 1923), Muriel (born 1924) and Donald (born 1938). Max Maltzman became an American citizen in 1923. Maltzman and his wife moved to Los Angeles in the 1920s. He established an office at 169 North La Brea Avenue, and later at 704 South Spring Street.

Maltzman was known to be an avid Boston sports fan and frequently attended games at Fenway Park, cheering on the dominant Boston Red Sox through their championship seasons in 1912, 1915, 1916 and 1918. Even after moving across the country he remained committed to Major League Baseball as a Red Sox fan, and eventually began following other American sports, becoming a fan of the Boston Celtics in the 1940s and the Boston Patriots in 1960s. Maltzman passed this fandom on to his children as well, and as Elliott, Muriel and Donald grew up and had families of their own, they would all gather each Sunday to watch the Patriots play football. These traditions have persisted even after his death, as his grandchildren and great grandchildren carry on his memory through their support of Boston sports.

Maltzman died in August 1971 in Los Angeles, at the age of 72.

== Work ==
Several of Maltzman's buildings have become significant monuments, for example, The Ravenswood in Hollywood, which the City of Los Angeles declared in 2003 to be a Historic Cultural Monument, and the Charmont Apartments, which the federal government has placed on the National Register of Historic Places. In 1929 Matzlman designed and built The Northmere at 1840 N Berendo Street in Los Feliz. The 18-unit apartment radiates a hybrid of Italian Revival meets Spanish Colonial Revival architecture and has been featured in numerous films, television programs, and commercials.

Maltzman operated during the era of Old Hollywood glamor, and several stars from that era, including Mae West, Clark Gable and Ava Gardner sought to live in his buildings.

In 1952, Maltzman was hired by Chicago organized crime figures to be the supervising architect for the Sahara Casino in Las Vegas.
