= Westlake, Los Angeles =

Westlake
- Neighborhood of Los Angeles
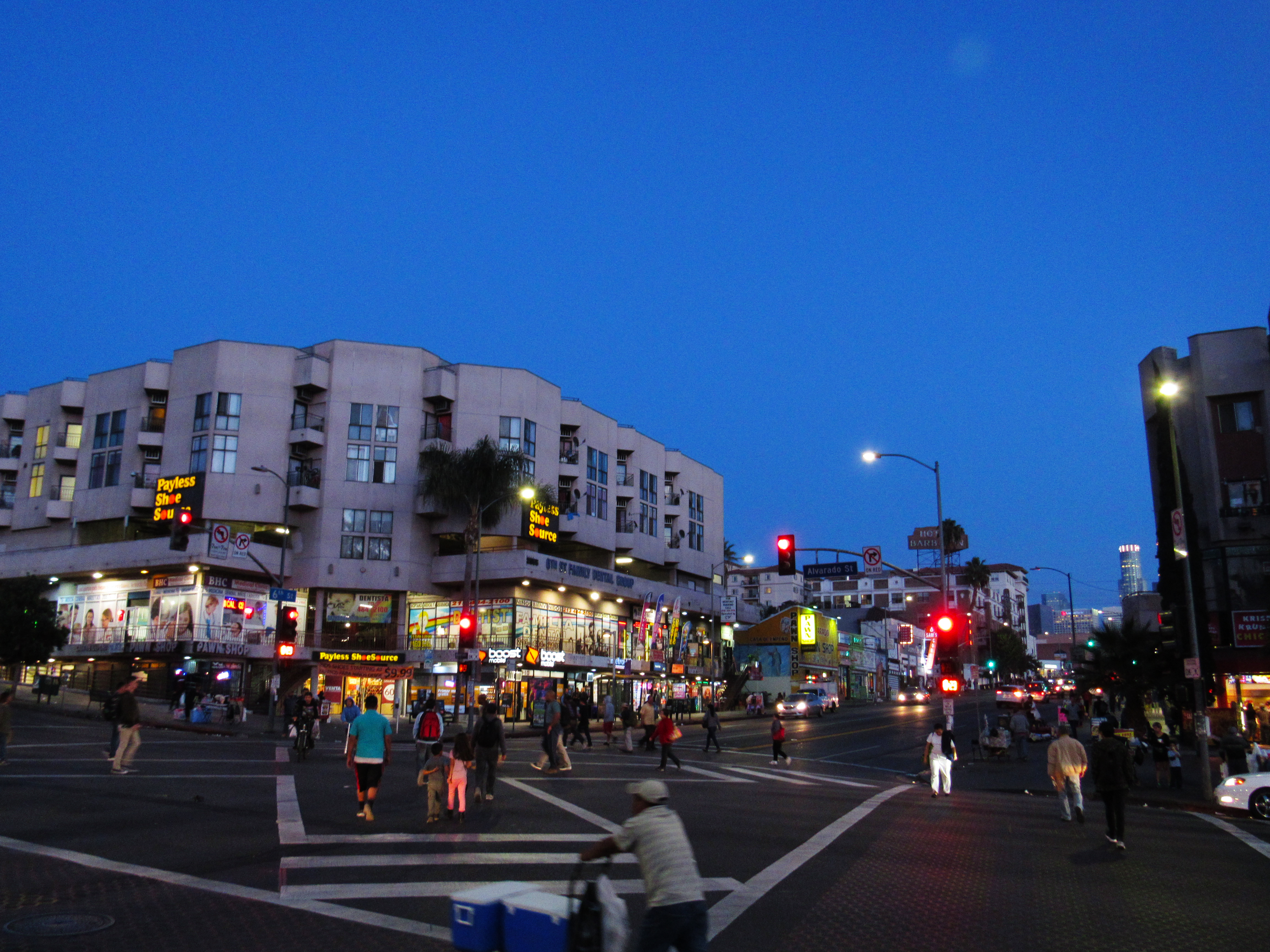
- 6th and Alvarado streets in the neighborhood, 2018

- Location within Los Angeles
- Coordinates: 34°03′13″N 118°16′48″W
- Country: United States
- State: California
- County: Los Angeles
- City: Los Angeles

Population (2024)
  - Total: 116,376
- Time zone: Pacific
- Zip Code: 90017, 90012, 90026, 90057
- Area code: 213

Westlake, also known as the Westlake District, is a residential and commercial neighborhood in Central Los Angeles, California, United States. It was developed in the 1920s.

Westlake is a high-density area, with a young and heavily Latino population. It contains many primary and secondary schools.

== History ==
=== Early development ===
In 1887, Westlake was referred to as the "southwest quarter" of Los Angeles. The Westlake hills were already "dotted with fine residences, and it is plainly to be seen that the development of this quarter is in its infancy. The Bonnie Brae, Westlake Park and other tracts in the neighborhood have been almost wholly disposed of by the subdividers, and many of the lots have passed into second and third hands, at advancing prices. The Baptist College, now well under way, looms up to the northward."

The neighborhood was named for Westlake Park, the land for which had been donated by Henricus Wallace Westlake, a Canadian physician who moved to Los Angeles around 1888. He built his house on Burlington Avenue in the district that later bore his name; the residence was the first to rise in the rolling hills west of the more settled and built-up part of the town.

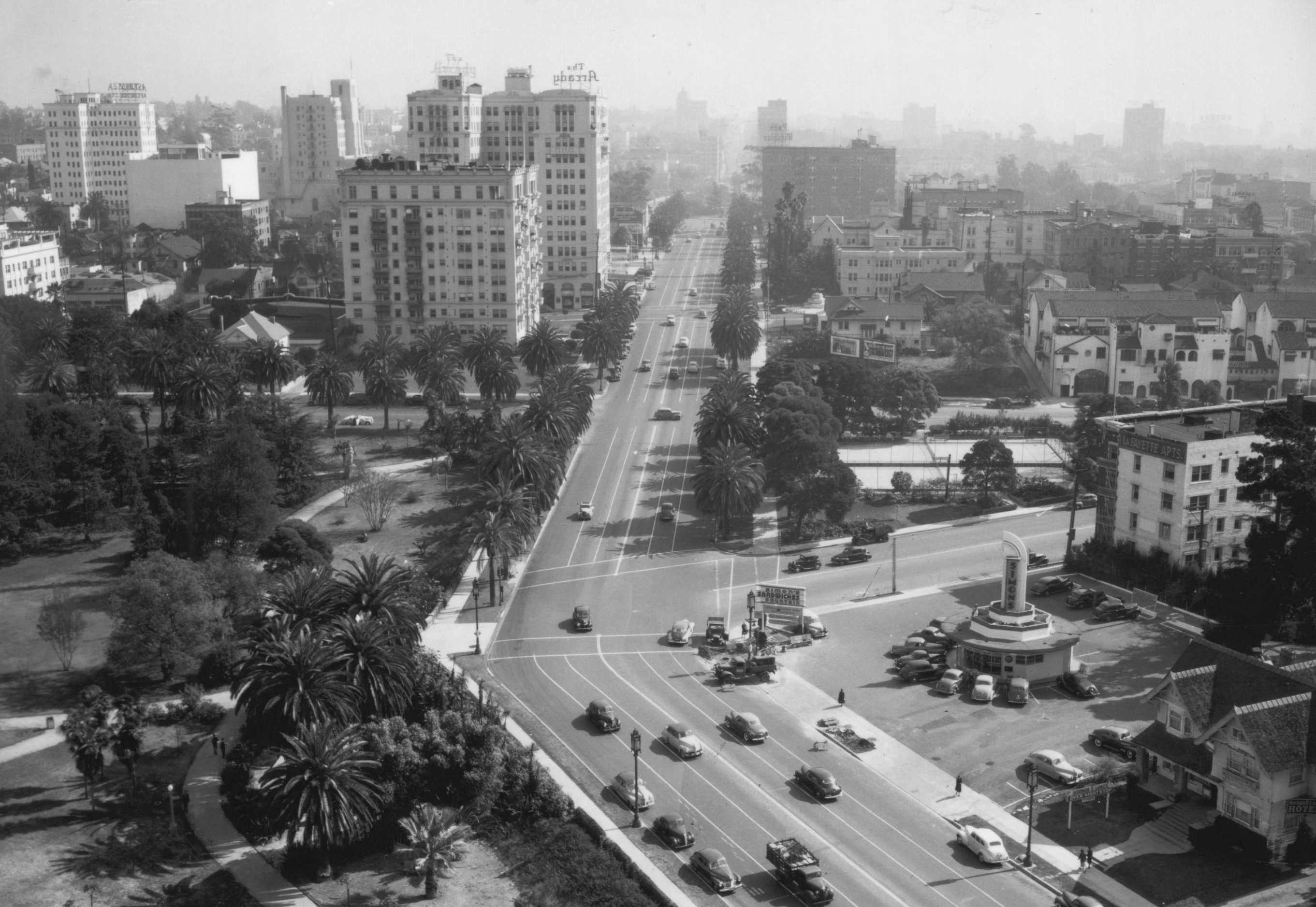
Looking southeast along Wilshire from Lafayette Park, 1945

One of the first areas of Los Angeles west of Figueroa Street to see residential development, Westlake came to have a significant Jewish population. Wealthy businessmen commuted to downtown, Wilshire Center (now Koreatown), Hollywood, and the Miracle Mile from the district's Spanish Revival and Art Deco mansions. Around the 1940s the district's northwestern blocks fringed the home of Los Angeles' early working class Filipino population who were shifted from what is today Little Tokyo and Bunker Hill, some of which remain in parts of Westlake and nearby neighborhoods like Echo Park, Silver Lake, and East Hollywood.

=== Oil exploitation ===
In 1899, newly drilled oil wells in the area, with their unsightly derricks, were said to cause pollution and runoff in the streets "at every hard rain," and residents of the neighborhood were "indignant that nothing was done for their relief." The city had declared a 1,600-foot zone around Westlake Park where drilling was forbidden (later modified to 1,000 feet), but the legality of that ordinance was under attack by oilmen such as W.E. de Groot. Even City Attorney Walter F. Haas thought the law was invalid, although he had to defend it as part of his duty. Nevertheless, a Superior Court judge, in the case of People v. Richard Green and others, held the city law to be valid. By 1900, however, it was found that oil production in Westlake had been, in effect, "pumped dry," and the situation ceased to make news.

=== Proposed factory district ===
Residents were alarmed in May 1919 by a petition being circulated by entrepreneur Arthur Evans to build a "high-class," six-story building on the southwest corner of Westlake Avenue and Orange Street "for the manufacture of women's apparel."

Supposedly having the backing of 85% of property owners adjoining the site in the affected Lazard tract, the promoters said they wanted to build in the Lakewood District because they could not get the kind of women workers they sought if they built in the city's industrial district, with its associated smoke and dust. They promised the employment of 1,000 workers, mostly women, as well as a school to teach "the finer grades of needlework" and a permanent exhibition space devoted to showing how garments are made. A "mammoth petition of protest" was presented to a City Council committee on June 12 by a throng of opponents and the applicant, identified as the Brownstein-Lewis Company, withdrew the plan and never resubmitted it.

=== Decline and Redevelopment ===
In its early years, Westlake was considered one of the most desirable residential areas in the city – "the new gathering place for the city's 'carriage trade'", as one observer recalled in 1997. With time, though, as another put it, "The white gentry fled to Encino and Westwood, leaving their ghost buildings behind them."

In the 1980s the neighborhood was infused with refugees from Central American countries like El Salvador, where a civil war had displaced a million people. In time, young Salvadorans formed a gang called Mara Salvatrucha, meaning, roughly, Gang of the Salvadoran Guy; for short, it was labeled MS-13. In time, the gang had spread to 33 other states and five countries.

By 1990 Westlake had become a grim area "where heroin addicts and youthful gang members control the public alleyways and clamber across people's rooftops to elude police." Some alleys had become refuges for the homeless, with no toilets, and piles of garbage were accumulating. The neighborhood was replete with sidewalk vendors in 1993, from whom sometimes gang members, called cholos, were demanding "rent" to use the public sidewalks, which were bustling with refugees from Mexico, El Salvador, Guatemala and other Latin American countries. It was said that trepidation, or fear, was "the price of living and working in the Westlake district." People lived on the underground economy, strictly cash, and the district was infested with "some of the city's largest and most menacing street gangs," with police and residents complaining of drug dealing, prostitution, thievery and extortion. Yet there was an air of economic energy and potential, with the vast majority of the residents just wanting to make an honest living.

Seventeen years later, crime had dropped and Westlake was on a road to gentrification. As rentals and property values in Downtown Los Angeles and nearby Koreatown rose, artists and other creative people moved into Westlake. "Swanky nightclubs, organic tamale co-ops and art galleries" followed. The change was traced to intensive anti-crime and cleanup efforts in MacArthur Park, particularly since the installation of surveillance cameras in 2004. A business improvement district was formed.

In January 2012, the city launched a campaign under a new city ordinance dealing with illegal street vendors throughout Los Angeles, but with principal effect in Westlake and the Venice neighborhood. The ordinance outlawed the sale of items with "utilitarian value," like socks and T-shirts but allowed vendors to sell art objects. A city-sponsored weekend market was set up, which required vendors to undergo training and licensing. Enforcement of this ordinance has been very sporadic, and sidewalk vending remains very common throughout the areas surrounding MacArthur Park, especially along Alvarado Street.

In the years since the COVID-19 pandemic, MacArthur Park and the surrounding blocks have become a major epicenter of the opioid epidemic in the United States. The area, which has long struggled with public drug dealing and drug use, has seen some of the highest rates of Fentanyl overdoses in the city. The massive increase in the homeless population, along with the introduction of extremely potent synthetic opioids, has led to a public health crisis in the neighborhood. In many areas surrounding the park, especially in the alleys behind Alvarado Street, public drug use has become a constant reality, and individual locations frequently see multiple overdoses every single day.

== Notable construction ==
=== Residential ===
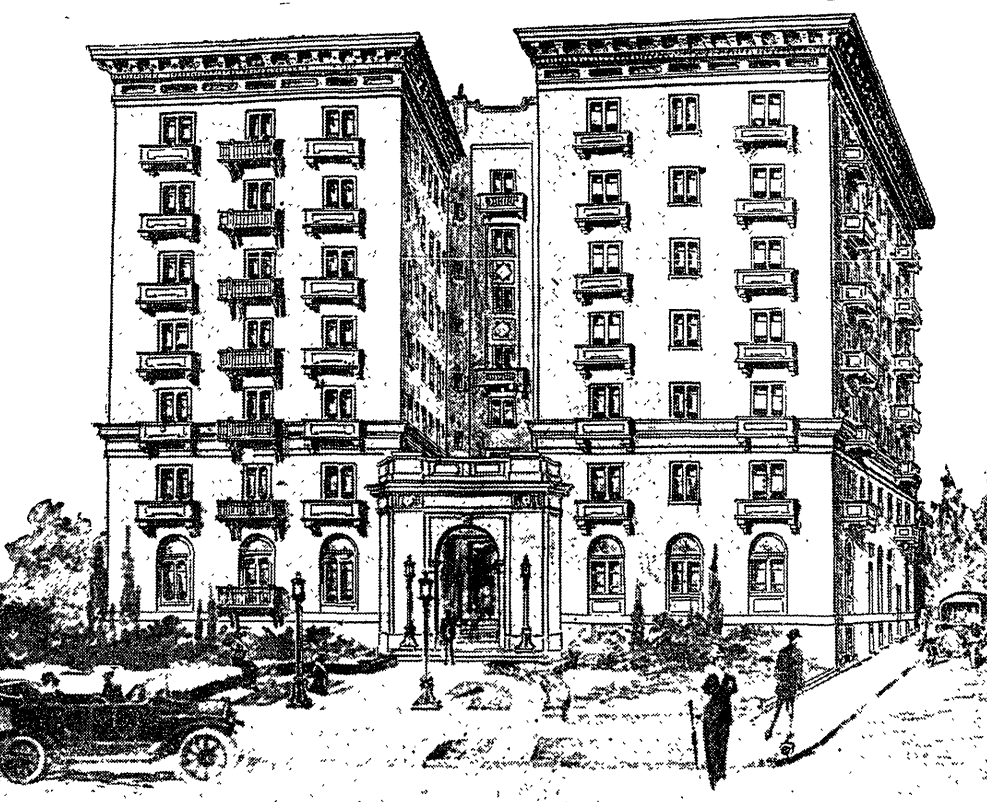
Sketch of apartment building on the northwest corner of Sixth and Lake, 1915. It later became the Hotel Ansonia

- Hotel, 1901. A five-story hotel was planned for the southeastern corner of Sixth and Alvarado, across from Westlake Park, with John Parkinson as the architect. There were to be 300 guest rooms, as well as "public and private dining-rooms, kitchen, ladies' billiard room, office, ball-room and the many business accessories of a first-class tourist hotel."
- Hotel, 1902. Ground was broken at Sixth and San Joaquin (today's Lake Street) for a four-story hotel with Mission architecture designed by A.L. Haley and George Black on the northwest corner, opposite the park. "The house will be so arranged that all guests' rooms will be outside, and it will have hydraulic elevators, a ballroom with stage, and the usual billiard-rooms, bathrooms, dining-rooms, kitchens and servants' quarters. For the latter there will also be provided a separate, detached building that will contain forty-eight rooms."
- Apartment building, 1915. A seven-story structure at Sixth and Lake was designed by John Parkinson for owner James H. Edmonds and featured a ladies' parlor, a billiard and card room and a 40-by-70-foot ballroom. There were 32 four-room and eight three-room suites. "All bedrooms will be arranged for open beds instead of the customary wall beds... . A refrigeration system designed to cool all the ice boxes in the various apartments from a central plant in the basement will be a feature." It later became the Hotel Ansonia.
- Hotel Californian, 1925. The spacious hotel on the northwest corner of Sixth and Bonnie Brae, with its "baths and showers, double closets and radio communications," was opened with elaborate entertainment and ceremonies on April 1. "A novel arrangements of doors can operate to divide the building into quarters, as an extra precaution against fires... . The main lobby itself is done in antique wood effect, polychromed and picked in with dulled-off primary colors, and carefully highlighted with gold leaf. The fixture are hand-wrought ornamental iron, while beautiful tapestries and pictures on the walls add the finishing touches."[6] The hotel was destroyed by fire in 1961 (see Notable fires, below).
- Hotel Arcady and Wilshire Royale, 1927. The 12-story hotel was launched in January 1927 on the northeast corner of Wilshire and Rampart boulevards at a cost of $2.25 million, of which bonds of $1.325 million were purchased by S.W. Strauss and Company. Designed by architects Walter & Elsen, the building, constructed for Olive Phillips, housed two- to four-room suites. The completed hotel was to be operated by Fletcher & Lilly, who were already running the nearby Gaylord Apartments. In 1953 the hotel was bought by Fifield Manor, a nonprofit corporation, to become a senior residence. Mrs. Helen Ramsay Fifield was listed as the president. The name of the 193-unit Beaux-Arts building was changed to Wilshire Royale, and it was purchased by MWest Holdings for $32.5 million in 2015.
- Apartment project, 2010. The MacArthur Park Metro Apartments, a $45 million joint venture between Metro and the Los Angeles Housing Partnership, among others. broke ground. It was to include affordable-housing units and some 30,000 square feet of retail space.

=== Other ===
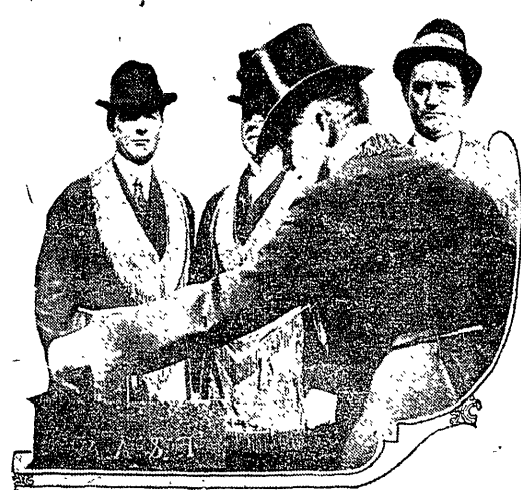
Masonic California Grand Master Benjamin F. Bledsoe (foreground), with the cornerstone for a new lodge building in 1913, as William R. Hervey and Champ S. Vance watch

- Masonic Lodge, 1914. Oliver Perry Dennis and Henry Harwood Hewitt were the architects for a $30,000 building erected on the southwest corner of Eighth and Burlington by the Westlake Masonic Association, with the ground floor given over to space for seven or eight retail shops and the second floor for the lodge headquarters, lodge hall finished in Philippine mahogany and banquet hall finished in white enamel.
- Elks Lodge, 1924. Plans for a magnificent, $1.5 million, seven-story Elks Lodge on the southwest corner of Sixth and Park View streets, with an entrance on Carondelet Street, were announced in March 1924. It was to consist of a lodge room with seating capacity for 1,500 people, a ballroom with a stage area for presentations and a gymnasium. On the fourth floor were to be a grill, billiard and card rooms, seven private dining rooms, directors' rooms and a band and glee club hall. There were to be 175 hotel rooms, and in the basement were planned six bowling alleys and a swimming pool. There was a 350-car garage with ten handball courts on the roof. Two roof gardens were planned. Architects were Curlett & Beelman. The structure was sold by the Elks and is now the Park Plaza Hotel (Los Angeles) at 607 South Park View.

==== Housing ====
Everyone knows the area suffers from overcrowded housing conditions and absentee landlords.

— Roberto Lovato, executive director of the Central American Refugee Center, who paid a visit to the temporary shelter for Burlington Avenue fire victims (below)

The neighborhood is home to many large apartment complexes built during its heyday in the early 20th century. The old housing stock and very large population of low-income, immigrant renters has attracted many absentee landlords with reputations for neglecting building maintenance and subjecting tenants to hazardous conditions.

In 1990 a jury convicted a landlord of 23 counts of having slum conditions at a building he owned at 737 South Westlake Avenue in Los Angeles. Devanand Sharma failed to provide tenants with heat, did not repair broken windows, fire doors and smoke detectors, and kept walls, ceilings and plumbing in a deteriorated condition. His brother was dubbed the city's "worst slumlord" after a 1987 conviction for slum conditions and had been a fugitive for two years.

In 1993, in the wake of a deadly fire at 330 South Burlington Avenue (see Notable fires, below), major reforms proposed to help avert similar tragedies had not been implemented, and serious fire safety violations persisted in the Westlake and Pico-Union areas. Plans for new fees, a fire inspection task force and a computerized record-keeping system were stalled. But fire officials said that budget constraints and the city bureaucracy thwarted their plans. Nevertheless, in that year an appeals court said that a trial could go ahead against Highland Federal Bank, even though it was not an actual owner; it was accused of operating a network of slum buildings in Los Angeles, for one of which, the Cameo Hotel at 504 South Bonnie Brae Street in Westlake, the owner was listed as "Teluce Black," a Labrador Retriever. That decision set a statewide precedent. Authorities alleged the bank knowingly helped finance purchases in Westlake, Echo Park, Hollywood, South-Central, Koreatown and Pico-Union by buyers who had no means and no intention of keeping the structures in repair. Slum conditions were cleaned up after the suit was filed, and, in a 1996 settlement, the bank agreed to pay US$1.4 million to tenants, to the city and to public-interest attorneys.

In 1999 Judge Leland Harris sentenced another landlord, Ronald J. Olenczuk, to live in a room on the fifth floor of his own six-story, 96-unit building at 744 South Beacon Avenue. The owner had to remain there from 7 p.m. until 7 a.m. for 45 consecutive days. During the other hours he was allowed to supervise repairs to the building. The landlord had been found guilty of 12 code violations on the building, including broken fire doors, fire escape drop-ladders that did not work, blocked fire-sprinkler controls, broken windows, broken and missing smoke detectors and exposed live electrical wiring. He had to pay US$1,774 in fines and perform 100 hours of community service. Other legal action followed against other slum building owners.

== Geography ==
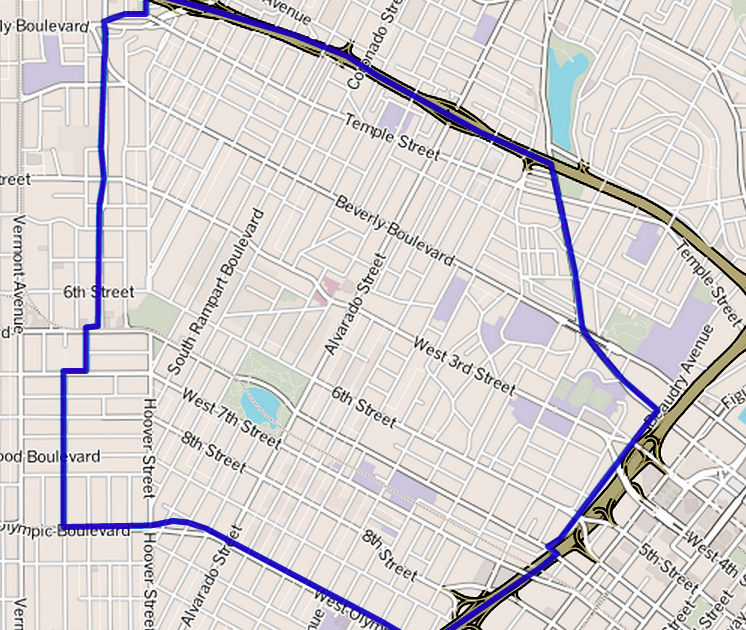
Boundaries of Westlake from the Mapping L.A. project of the Los Angeles Times.

Multiple sources outline different boundaries for Westlake.

=== City of Los Angeles ===
The Westlake Community Plan area (CPA) of the city of Los Angeles is bounded by Temple Street on the north, the Harbor Freeway on the east, the Santa Monica Freeway on the south, Washington Boulevard on the southwest, and an irregular line along Hoover Street on the west.

Los Angeles City Planning notes that the Westlake CPA "includes the neighborhoods of Historic Filipinotown, Pico-Union, Rampart Village, and Westlake, among others."

Neighborhood councils that fall within the Westlake CPA are as follows: Westlake North, Westlake South, MacArthur Park (partly), Rampart Village (partly), Pico–Union (partly), Echo Park (partly), and Downtown Los Angeles (partly).

=== Mapping L.A. Project ===
In the Los Angeles Times' Mapping L.A. project, the street boundaries of Westlake are the Hollywood Freeway on the north, Glendale Boulevard and Second Street on the east, Beaudry Avenue and the Harbor Freeway on the southeast, West Olympic Boulevard on the southeast and south, Westmoreland Avenue, Wilshire Place and Virgil Avenue on the west, and Temple Street and Hoover Street on the northwest. The Times notes that its entry on Westlake includes the neighborhoods of Historic Filipinotown, Lafayette Park, MacArthur Park and Temple–Beaudry.

In Mapping L.A., Westlake is flanked by Silver Lake to the north, Echo Park to the northeast and east, Downtown to the southeast, Pico-Union to the south and southwest and Koreatown to the west. Westlake touches East Hollywood on the northwest.

=== Google Maps ===
Google Maps draws the following boundaries for Westlake: The Hollywood Freeway on the north, the Harbor Freeway and Lucas Street on the east, the Santa Monica Freeway on the south. The boundary on the west is Hoover Street to Wilshire Boulevard, and Virgil Avenue to the Hollywood Freeway. (Note: Where other reliable sources are available for the boundaries of neighborhoods, they should be treated preferentially to Google Maps and Google Street View. It is difficult if not impossible to verify as they are subject to change and documentation and archives are not available.)

== Demographics ==
The 2000 U.S. census counted 108,839 residents in the 2.72-square-mile neighborhood—an average of 38,214 people per square mile, the second-highest density of any community in Los Angeles County, after Koreatown. In 2008 the city estimated that the population had increased to 117,756. It was estimated in 1993 that 85,000 people lived within a mile of the Alvarado/MacArthur Park Red Line station and that the density of this neighborhood rivaled that of Manhattan in New York City. Another report the same year said that at 147 people per acre Westlake had four times the average density of Manhattan and that "The vast majority of units are occupied by more than one family. Firefighters often find babies sleeping in dresser drawers, and children in closets that serve as their bedrooms." Nevertheless, census takers found that the average household size of three people was about the same as the rest of the city. Renters occupied 94.9% of the housing units, and house or apartment owners just 5.1%

Heavily Latino, Westlake was considered "not especially diverse" ethnically. The breakdown was Latinos, 73.4%; Asians, 16.5%; Whites, 4.5%; blacks, 3.9%, and others, 1.7%. Mexico (36.8%) and El Salvador (17.2%) were the most common places of birth for the 67.6% of the residents who were born abroad, a figure that was considered high compared to the city as a whole. The median age for residents was 27, considered young for both the city and the county.

The median household income in 2008 dollars was $26,757, a low figure for Los Angeles, and a high percentage of households earned $20,000 or less.

The percentages of never-married men and women, 47% and 36.4%, respectively, were among the county's highest. The 2000 census found 5,325 families headed by single parents, a high rate for both the city and the county. There were 2,591 military veterans in 2000, or 3.5%, a low figure for Los Angeles.

== Transportation ==
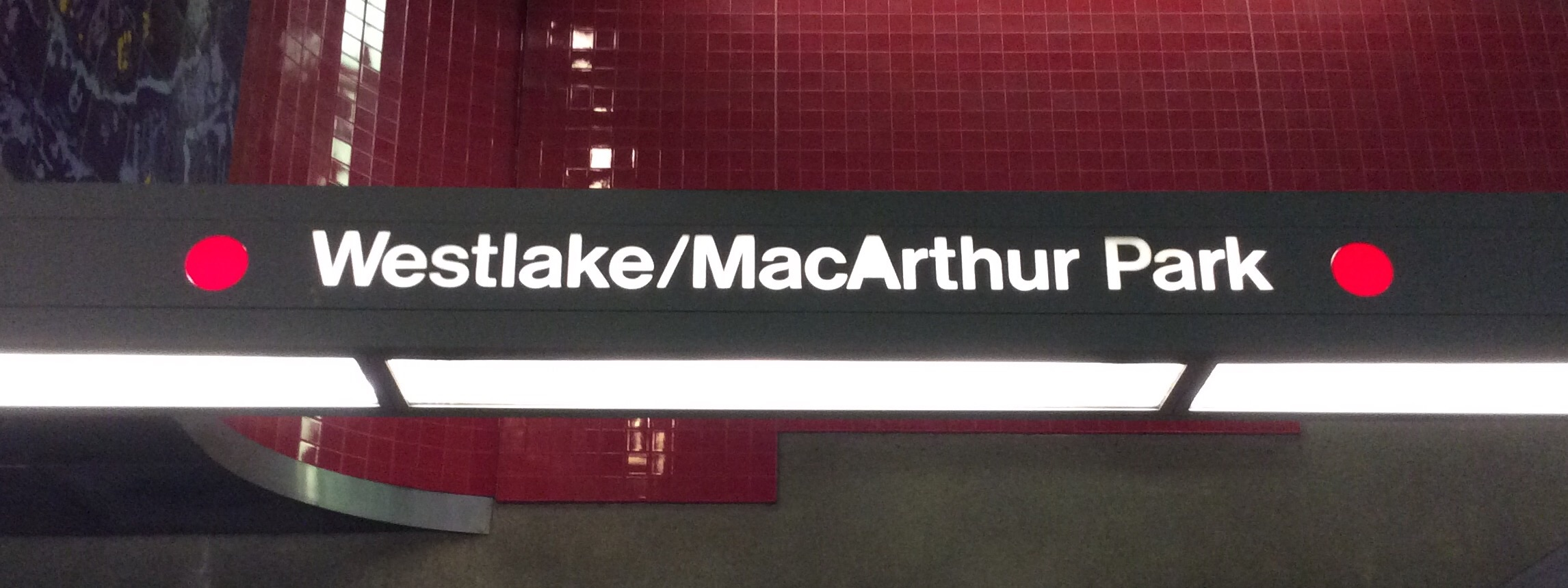
Station sign for Metro underground, 2015

Public transportation in Westlake was first proposed in 1887 by railroad entrepreneurs Herman Silver and J.F. Crank as a double-track street cable railroad with the western terminus at Seventh and Alvarado streets and the eastern at "the proposed union depot of the Atchison, Topeka and Santa Fe Railroad Company near the western extremity of the First Street Bridge," later amended to continue the road along First Street to Aliso Avenue and Chicago Street. In return for the franchise, the two men offered to donate $10,000 to the city. The railway ran to the southeastern corner of Westlake Park.

Westlake/MacArthur Park station of the Los Angeles Metro Rail system serves the neighborhood. Its entrance is across Alvarado Street from MacArthur Park. The station is served by both the B and D lines, and is the location of a city-sanctioned sidewalk market where vendors are permitted to set up on designated days.

== Emergency services ==
=== Police ===
==== Division headquarters ====
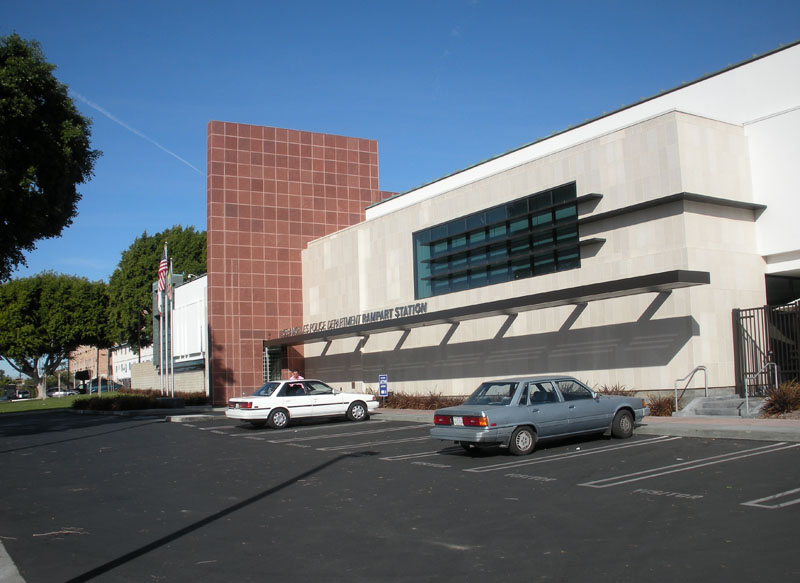
Rampart Division, LAPD, 2008

Westlake is patrolled by the Rampart Division of the Los Angeles Police Department, 1401 West 6th Street at Valencia Street, within the Westlake neighborhood.

==== Notable crimes ====
1906. On August 16, 1906, Annie Sanderson, 45, was slashed to death by her husband, Edward H. Sanderson, president of the California Truck Company, in their residence at 1336 Westlake Avenue. He then committed suicide by cutting his throat with the same knife.

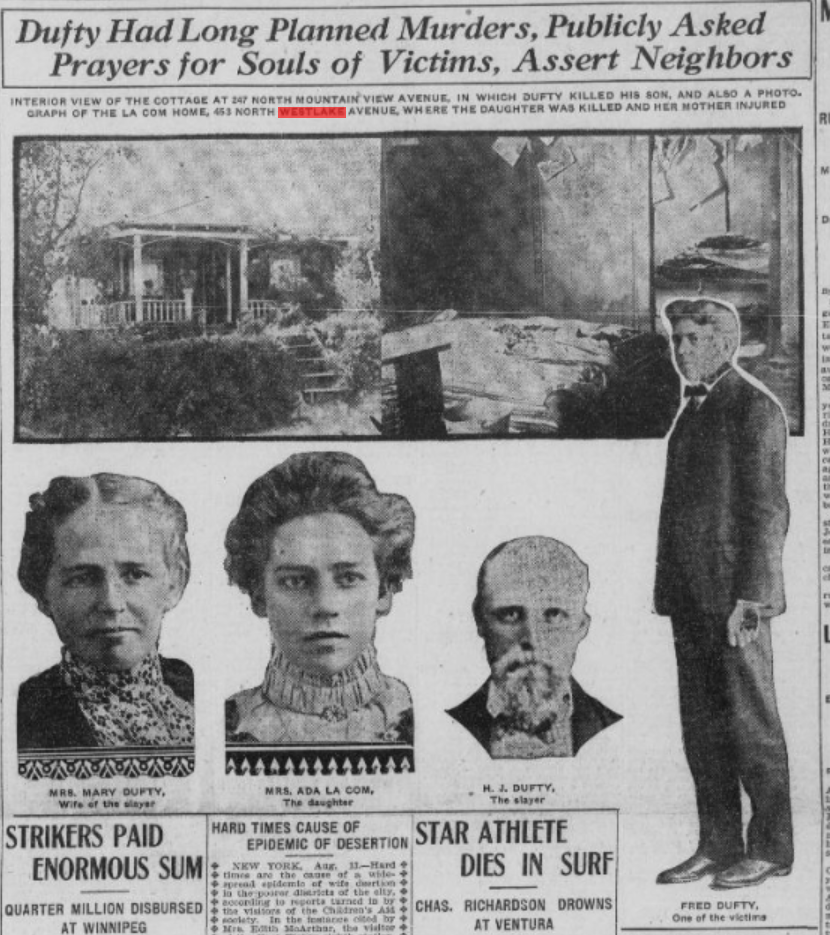
Westlake crime: front page of Los Angeles Herald for August 14, 1908

1908. Wielding a sharpened ax, Henry J. Dufty, 56, slew his sleeping 24-year-old son, Fred Dufty, a machinist, in the son's bungalow at 247 North Mountain View Avenue on August 13, then walked uphill to nearby 453 North Westlake Avenue, where he used the same instrument to decapitate his pregnant daughter, Zaidah La Com. He returned to his home, where he cut his own throat, attempting suicide. He had previously purchased gravestones for himself and his two children, which had already been laid at Evergreen Cemetery. A jury trial resulted in a verdict of insanity.

1922. On February 2, the body of motion picture director William Desmond Taylor was found on the floor of the living room of his bungalow at 404 Alvarado Street. He had been shot. The killer was never found.

1948. Joyce Corbley or Corbly, age given as either 22 or 38, died after shooting herself in the head on June 26 when she played a game of Russian roulette in a room at the Ansonia Apartments, 2205 West Sixth Street.

1996. On March 29, Linda Morimoto, a noted physician of the Japanese American community, was found bludgeoned to death on the floor of her ransacked home in the 400 block of Lafayette Park Place. No arrests were made.

2010. Two nights of violent protests troubled the Westlake neighborhood after a policeman fatally shot Manuel Jaminez, a Guatemalan construction worker who spoke no English and very little Spanish, at Sixth Street and Union Avenue on September 5. Police said Jaminez had threatened a woman with a knife, which he refused to drop.

2010. The mummified remains of a still-born baby and an infant, brother and sister, were discovered in August, wrapped in newspapers from the 1930s and hidden inside a trunk in the basement of an apartment building near MacArthur Park. They were identified as the children of Janet Mann Barrie, who had lived in the building and who died in Canada at age 97 in 1994.

2012. Pedro Martinez, a 26-year-old gang member, was sentenced to 100 years to life in prison for killing Andres Ordonez, 25, a church deacon who was trying to stop a woman from spray-painting, or tagging, an outside wall at Iglesia Principe de Paz Church on Beverly Boulevard. Ordonez was slain on November 4, 2012, when he and a fellow parishioner exited the church to stop the woman's vandalism; Martinez stepped from a nearby vehicle and opened fire, killing one and wounding the other. Nearby residents said that gang members had threatened violence against those who complained about or painted over graffiti. The woman was arrested and faces trial.

=== Fire service ===
==== Engine company ====
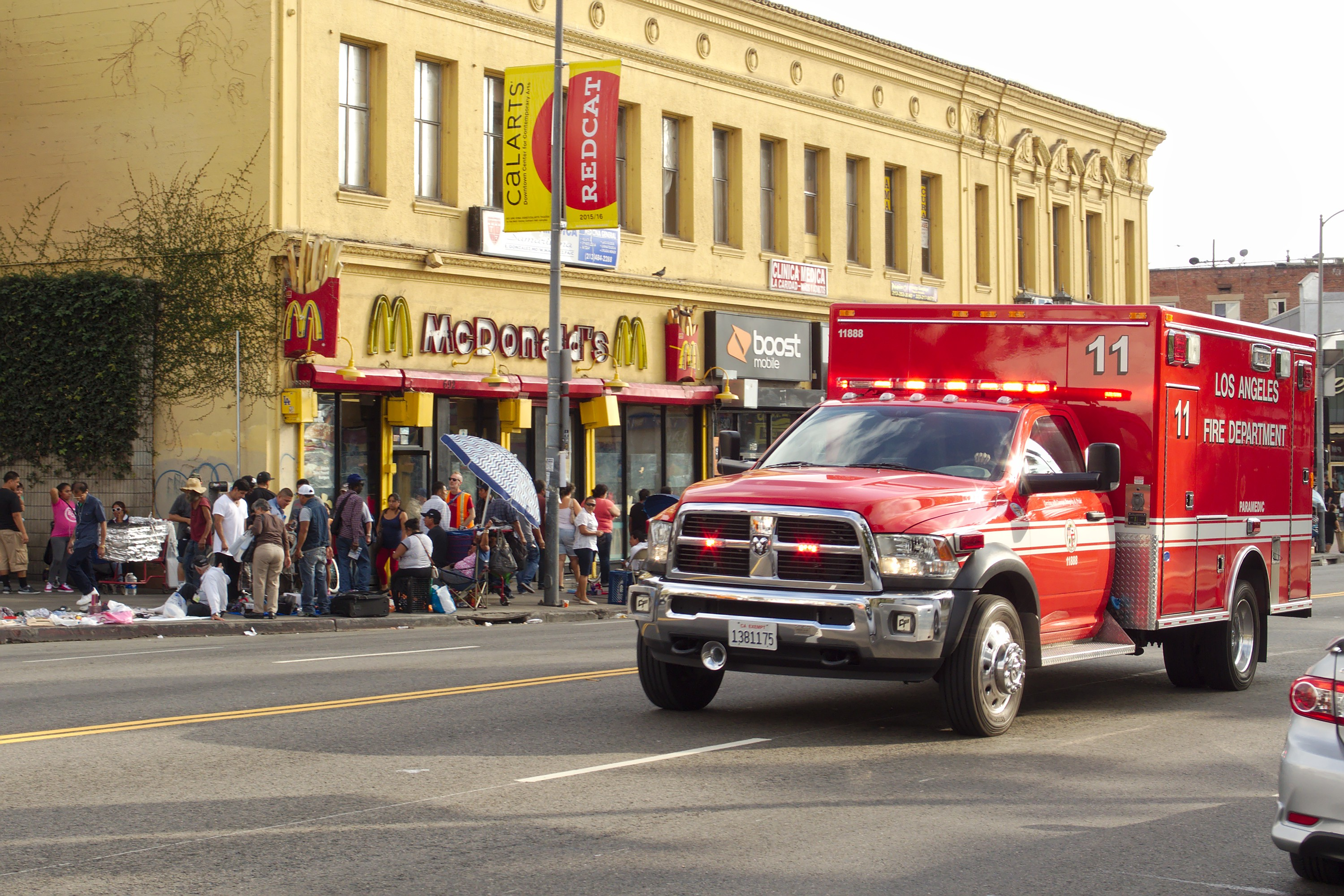
LAFD Rescue 11 on Alvarado Street, with sidewalk merchants in the background, 2015

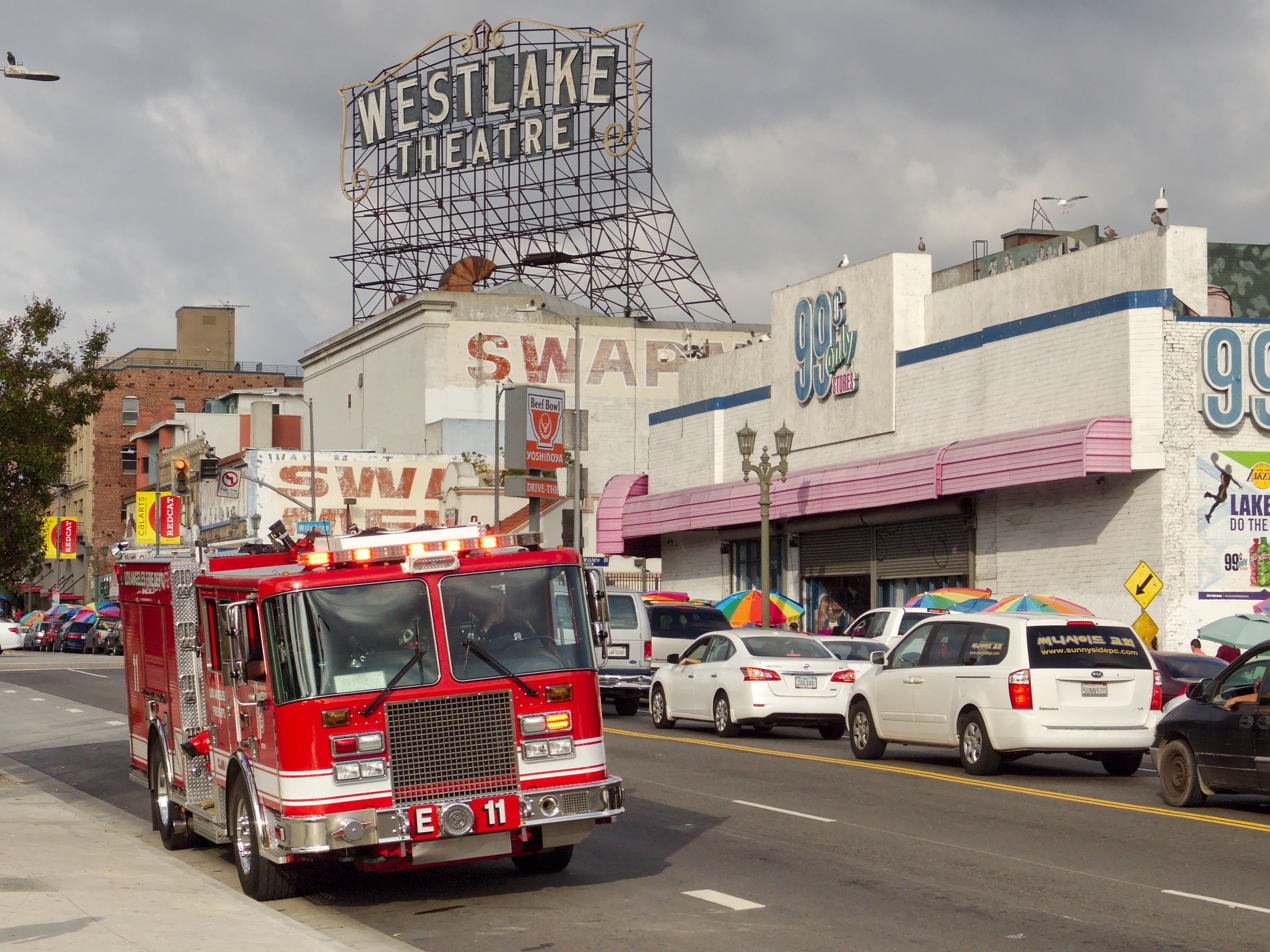
LAFD Engine 11, with the Westlake Theatre in the background, 2015

Los Angeles Fire Department Station 11 serves the area. In 1993 it was said to be one of the busiest fire stations in the country.

==== Notable fires ====
Hotel Coronado, 1905. An early-morning fire destroyed the massive and popular Hotel Coronado at 667 Coronado Street on December 4, 1905, after a delay in communicating by telephone with the fire department. The blaze spread rapidly, and more than eighty guests had to flee, some in their nightclothes. Sarah and Helen Mathewson were lessees of the hotel, which was owned by M.N. Russ Avery and Superior Judge Walter Bordwell. The tourist hotel was one of the most expensive in the city, "being patronized by wealthy persons to whom the cost was not a consideration."

By the time firefighters led by Chief Walter Lips arrived about an hour after the blaze was discovered, the hotel was already in ruins, and the men turned their efforts to saving nearby buildings. Close by were "scores of mansions, some of them among the finest in the city. Sparks dropping on the dry roofs... caused small blazes in many places. The occupants of the buildings in danger succeeded in extinguishing the blazing embers... . The costly furnishings of a number of fine houses were removed to places of safety outside the zone of danger," and neighbors gave shelter to hotel guests who had fled. The Mathewson sisters were overcome by smoke, but they survived; their pet dog died. Helen Mathewson later asserted charges of negligence against Chief Lips, which he denied.

Hotel Californian, 1961–1994. Flames engulfed the upper two floors of the five-story Hotel Californian at 1907 West Sixth Street on August 2, 1961. Firemen were threatened with injury when a water hydrant burst and a hose flailed about viciously before water was turned off. Scores of television aerials on the roof of the hotel hampered the men before the flames were brought under control. The hotel reopened, but became "a classic slum building where a changing cast of owners suck out profits, fail to make repairs and leave tenants in miserable conditions." City officials closed its entrances with plywood and metal bars, but homeless people broke through and made it their home. On November 21, 1994, it took 186 firefighters from three companies to quell a massive blaze that all but destroyed the place. Finally, the City Council ordered the old hotel razed as an irreparable hazard.

Burlington Avenue, 1993. Nine people, mostly immigrants from Latin America, and two fetuses died as a result of a fire that ravaged an apartment building at 330 Burlington Avenue on May 5. More than forty were injured. Some residents escaped by jumping from or, in the case of children, being thrown from upper floors into the arms of rescuers, but others died when they were trapped in smoke-filled hallways. Members of the 18th Street Gang joined in the rescue effort. More than a hundred shocked survivors were given emergency shelter in the Belmont High School gymnasium. It was the fourth-deadliest fire in the city's history. Fire officials said the owners failed to correct a faulty alarm system, amid other fire code violations. Some fire doors had been illegally propped open.

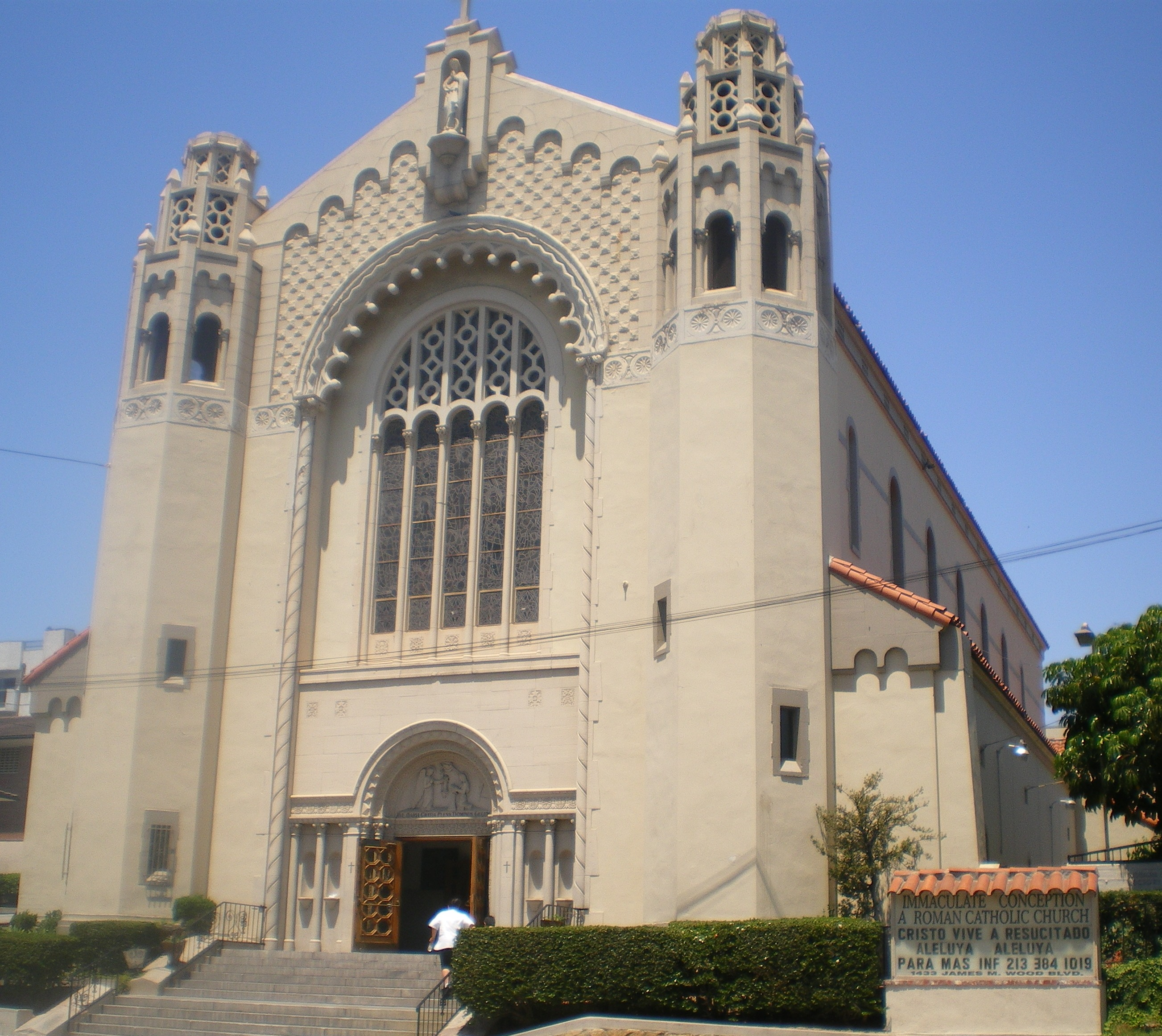
Church of the Immaculate Conception in Westlake

Four hundred mourners were at a special eulogy at the Church of the Immaculate Conception on Ninth Street (later James M. Wood Boulevard) in Westlake, where Cardinal Roger M. Mahony called upon city authorities to work toward improving apartment safety. Among the mourners were elementary school classmates of two of the dead children and a Fire Department honor guard of about two dozen firefighters, dressed in formal black uniforms. In all, the caskets at the funeral Mass contained the remains of 11, including three mothers (two of them pregnant), two fetuses and six children. The two fetuses were placed with their mothers in the caskets. A 15-month-old child of Guatemalan parents was buried earlier in Calvary Cemetery. The other remains were returned to Mexico and Guatemala.

In 1998, prosecutors filed charges against two men in the crime, alleging they were members of the 18th Street Gang who were attempting to intimidate an apartment manager who had tried to drive away drug dealers from the place. The charges were dropped after two years for lack of evidence.

In February 2017, police arrested "multiple people" in connection with the arson. Joseph Monge, 44, pleaded guilty to voluntary manslaughter in February 2020 and was to be sentenced to 11 years in prison. Others under arrest and facing trial were Johanna Lopez and Ramiro "Greedy" Valerio.

Footage of the aftermath of the fire appears in the 1993 mondo film Death Scenes 3.

McKinley House, 1994. After years of neglect and controversy, this boarded-up historic monument at Third Street and LaFayette Park Place finally succumbed when flames took the remains of what had been an elegant Italian Renaissance-style home overlooking Rampart Boulevard. Two transients were found dead when firemen were able to inspect the ruins. The 20-room house was built in 1915 by an Ohio millionaire who lived in it during the winter. Other families had it, too, until mortuary owner Maytor McKinley bought it in 1945. He died in 1970, and his widow, Vari Komp McKinley, lived there until her death in the mid-1980s. In 1987 developers purchased it with the intent of raising a 118-unit apartment complex on it. At the prodding of the Los Angeles Conservancy, the city declared it to be a cultural-historic monument. Rod and Sherry Daniels, intrigued by the idea of owning the beautiful old structure, bought it for $1 with the intention of moving it to Chatsworth in the San Fernando Valley. Over six years those plans stagnated and the property kept deteriorating until the 1994 blaze put an end to the Daniels' dream and the house as a historic structure.

Neighborhood residents launched a drive to turn the rubble-strewn lot into a neighborhood park; today the site is home to a privately owned school called the Lafayette Park Primary Center.

== Existing historic places ==
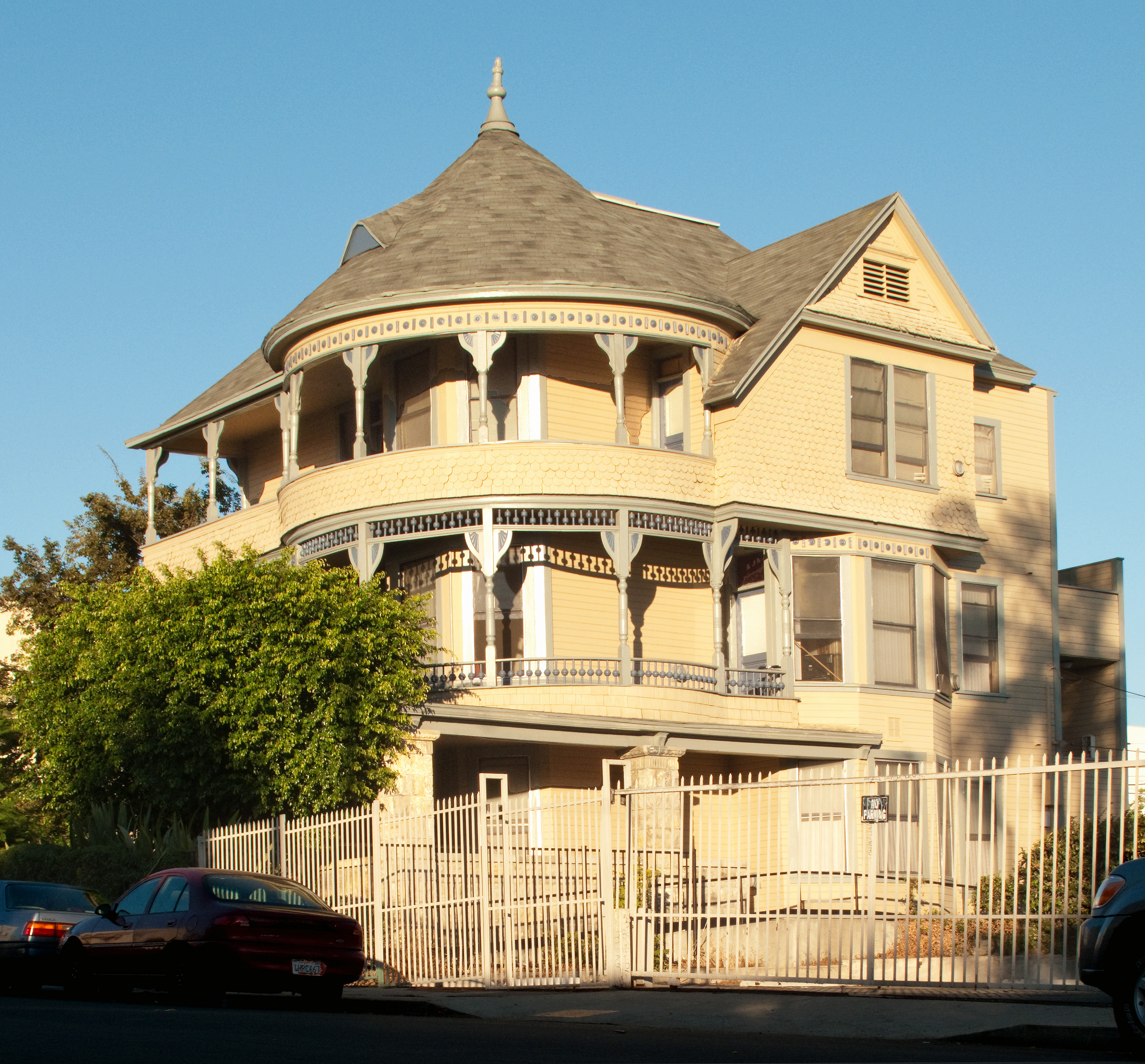
Victorian house at 826 South Coronado Street, 2012

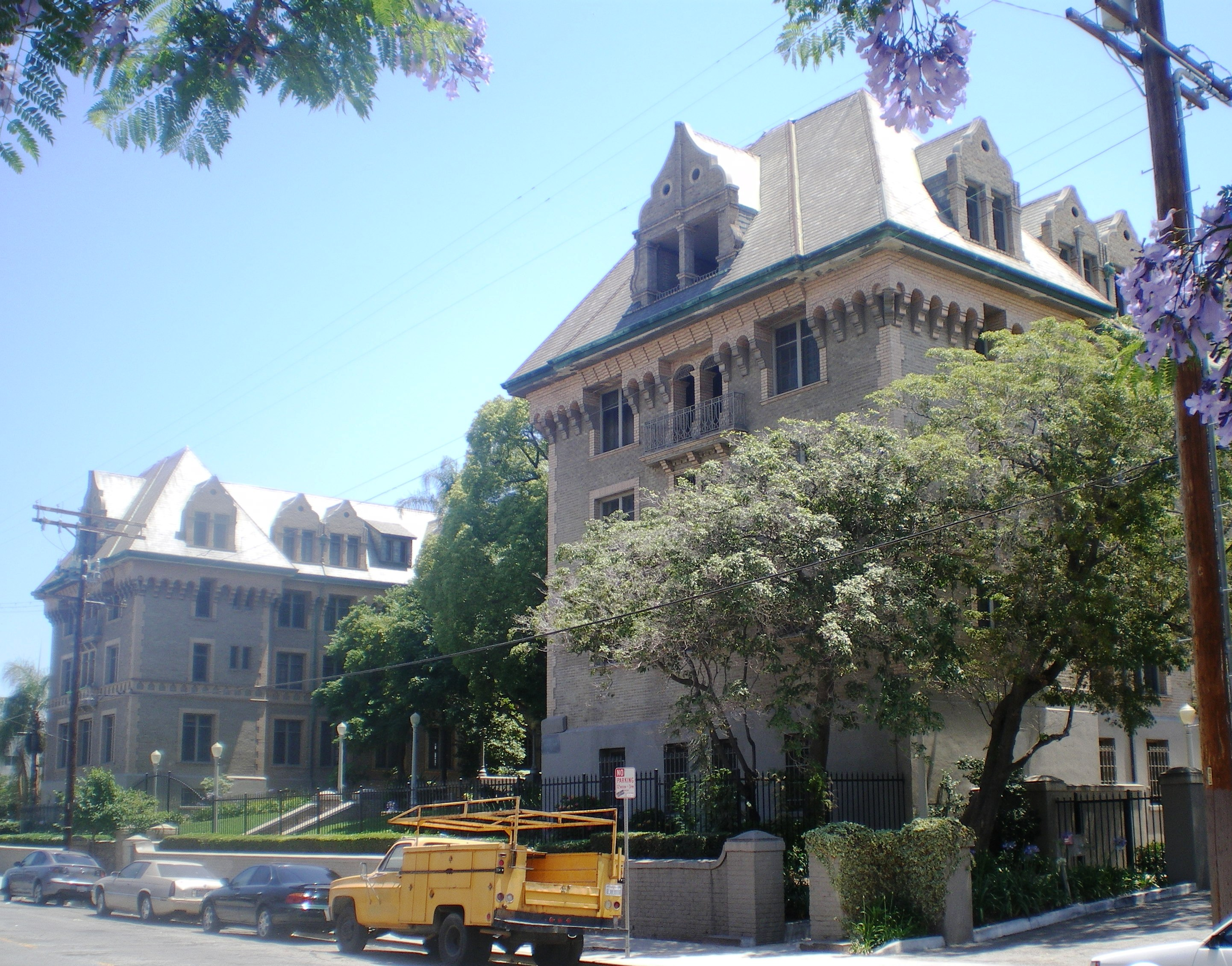
Mary Andrews Clark Memorial Home, 2008

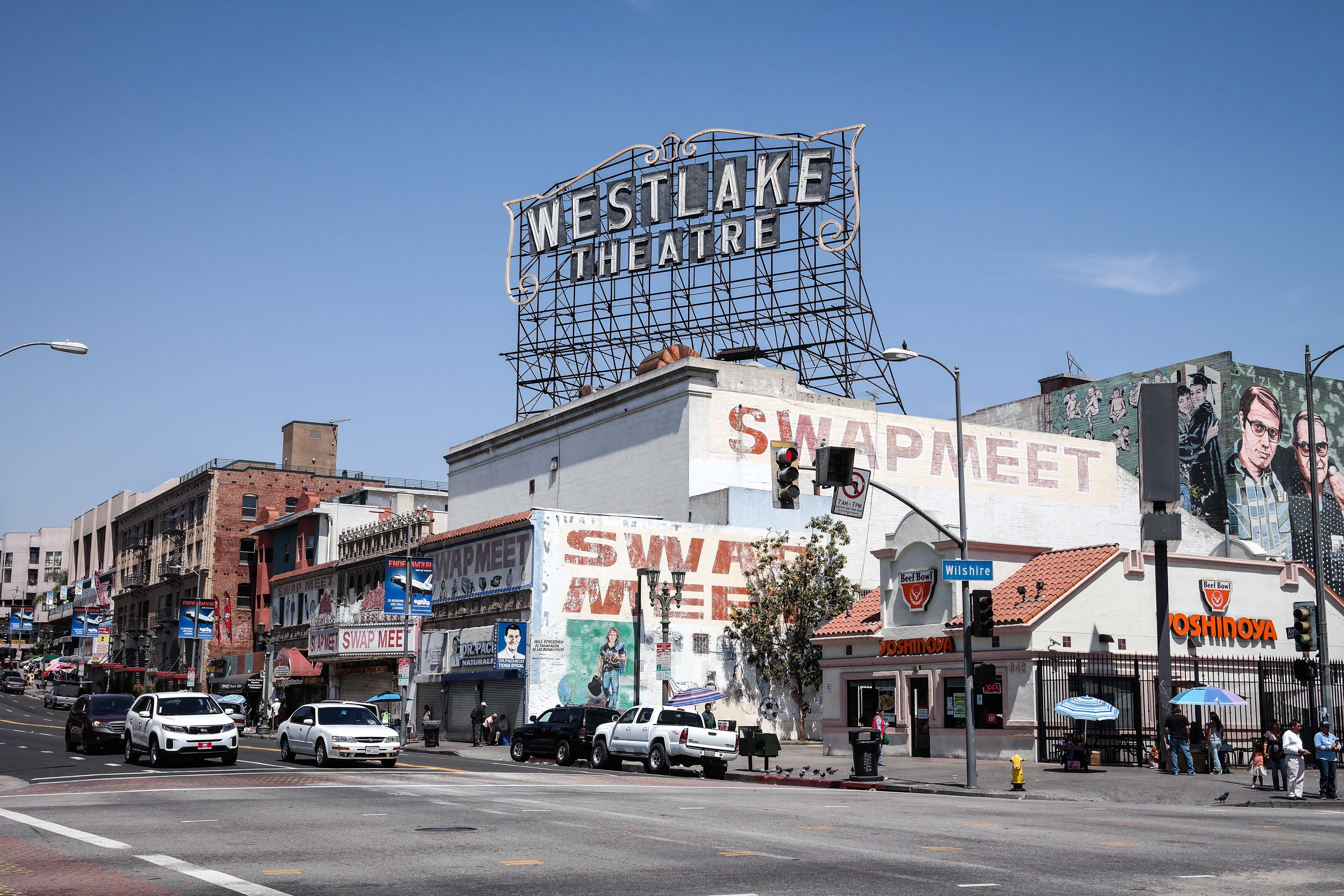
Westlake Theatre building, 2014

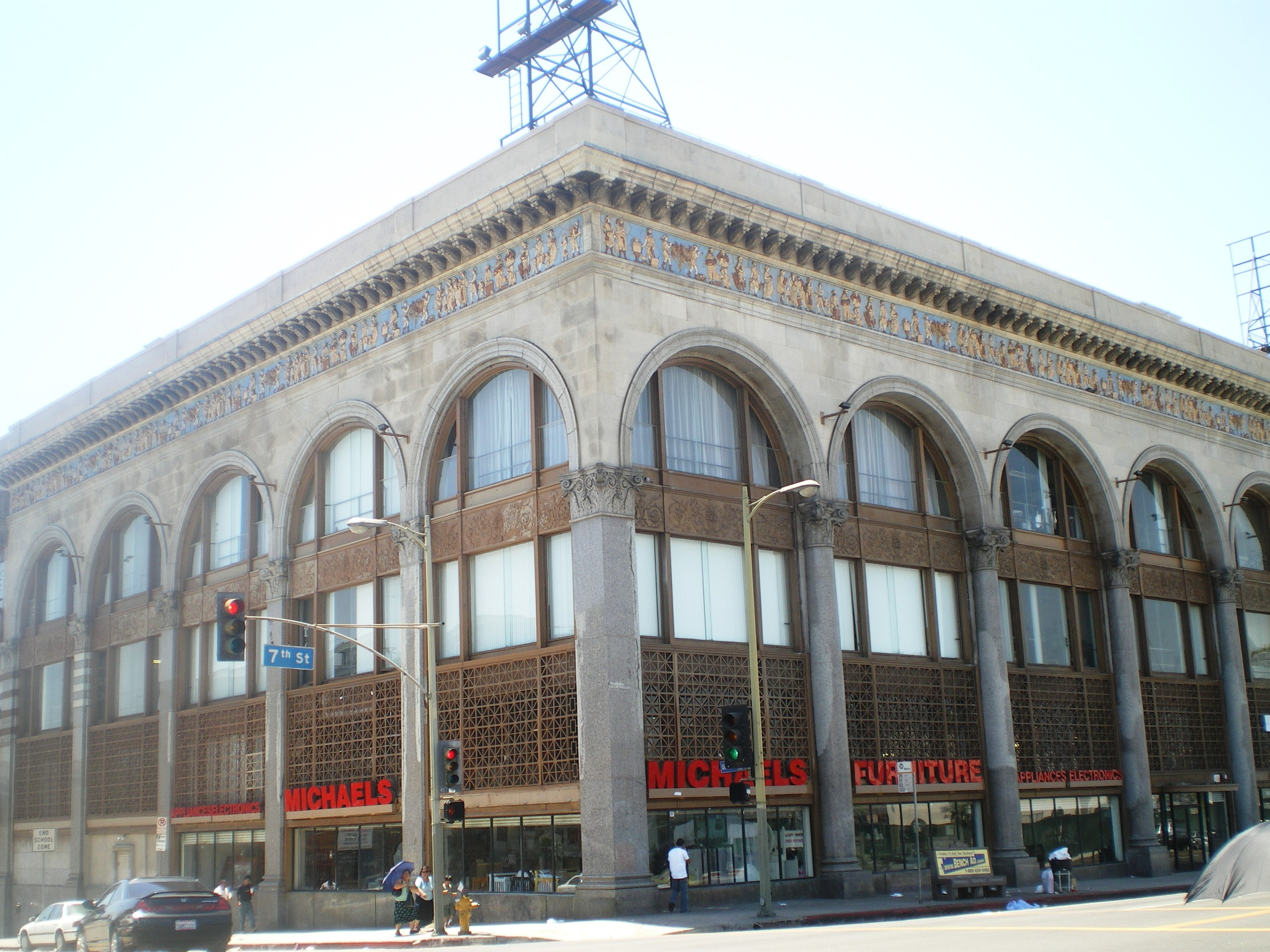
Young's Market Company Building, 2008

=== Built as residences ===
- 757-767 Garland Avenue. Queen Anne mansion for executive Charles C.L. Leslie
- 826 South Coronado Street residence
- David J. Witmer Family Houses and Compound, 1422 West Second Street and 208-210 1/2 Witmer Street
- Frederick Mitchell Mooers House, 818 South Bonnie Brae Street, named for its owner, who discovered the Yellow Aster gold mine after years of prospecting in the Mojave Desert
- Grieri-Musser House, 403 S. Bonnie Brae Street.
- Lewis House, 1425 Miramar Street, is a Queen Anne-style Victorian built in 1889 and attributed to Joseph Cather Newsom.
- Mary Andrews Clark Memorial Home, 306-336 South Loma Drive, is a large French colonial chateau-style structure built in 1913 as a YWCA home for young working women. In 1987 it was damaged by an earthquake and was sold. In October 1995 it was reopened with 152 bachelor units as a home to single, low-income workers. Each floor has a communal kitchen and lounge, and shower enclosures were built into the hallways because most of the rooms have only half-baths.
- Susana Machado Bernard House and Barn, 845 Lake Street

=== Other ===
- Alvarado Theatre, located on Alvarado at 7th Street, was built during the silent era. It became the Park Theatre in the 1960s and showed gay films. The building is now a swap meet.
- Belmont Tunnel / Toluca Substation and Yard, 1304 West Second Street
- Elks Lodge No. 99 / Park Plaza Hotel, West 6th Street at Park View Street. Done in a Neo Gothic style, the building still sports a brass sculpture of a set of elk antlers embedded in the clock above the entry. The Elks sold the building because of shrinking attendance, and it is now a luxury hotel.
- Felipe de Neve Branch Library, 2820 West Sixth Street
- Filipino Christian Church, 301 North Union Avenue
- First Congregational Church of Los Angeles, 540 South Commonwealth Avenue. Designed by Allison & Allison, built of reinforced concrete in 1932. Church founded 1867, oldest Protestant congregation in Los Angeles
- Hayworth Theatre, 2501-9 Wilshire Boulevard. Designed in the 1920s by Stiles O. Clements, this theater was designated a historical cultural monument in 1983. It was used by the Vagabond Theatre for 10 years ending in 1985. In 2018 the venue was reopened as an alternative comedy theatre under the name Dynasty Typewriter at The Hayworth.
- Lake Theatre, located on 7th Street across from the park, was a movie theatre from the silent era until the 1970s. The building is now a phone store.
- MacArthur Park. Land acquired on January 6, 1886. Lake enlarged in 1890 and bandstand erected in 1896. Renamed MacArthur Park from Westlake Park in 1942.
- Mother Trust Superet Center, 2506-2522 W. Third Street
- Park Wilshire Building, 2424 Wilshire Boulevard. Built in 1923, designed by Clarence H. Russell and Norman W. Alpaugh.
- Westlake Theatre, 634 South Alvarado Street
- Wilshire-Westlake Professional Building, 2001-2015 Wilshire Blvd.; 639 S. Westlake Avenue
- Young's Market Company Building, 1610 West 7th Street, built in the 1920s as a market and office building, with marble columns and terra cotta frieze; converted into lofts

== Notable businesses ==
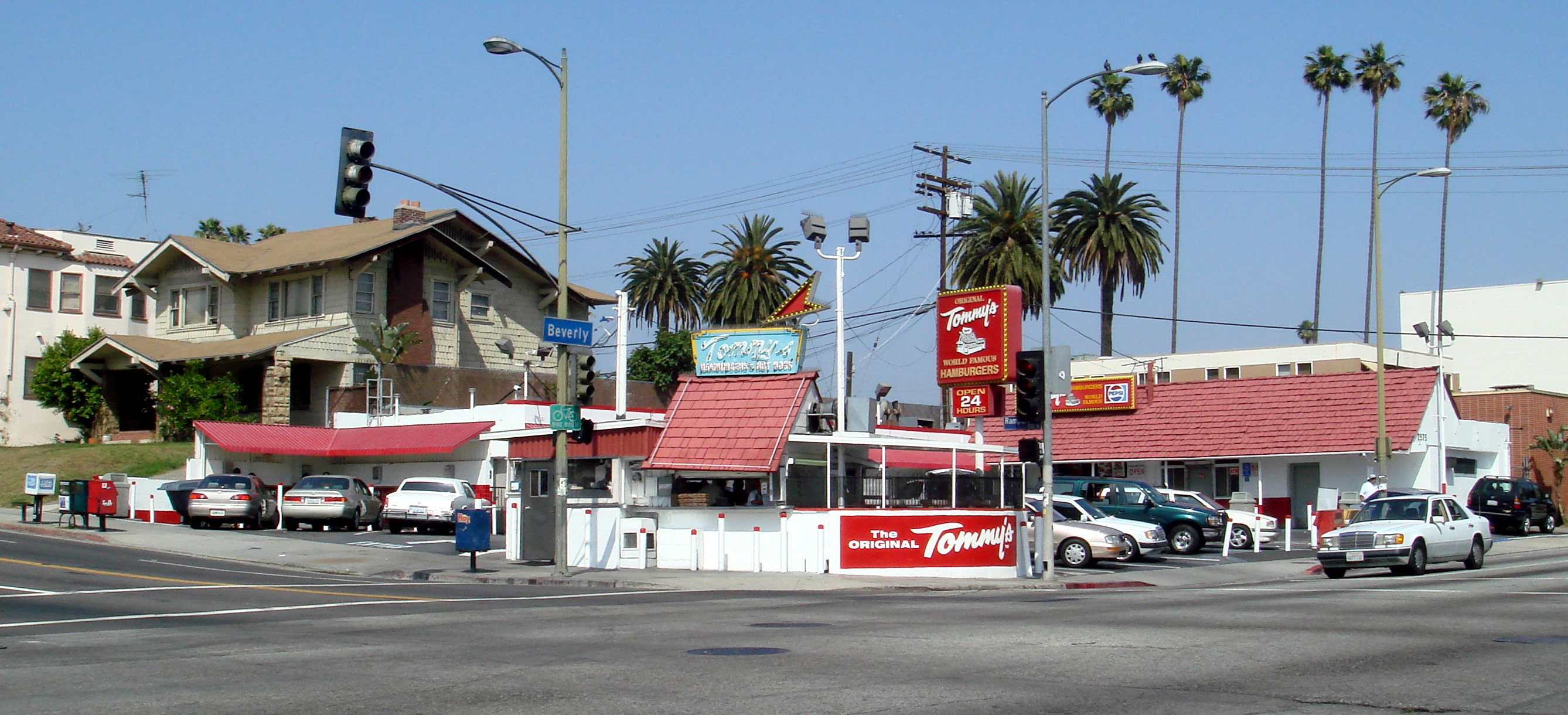
The first Original Tommy's hamburgers on the corner of Beverly and Rampart

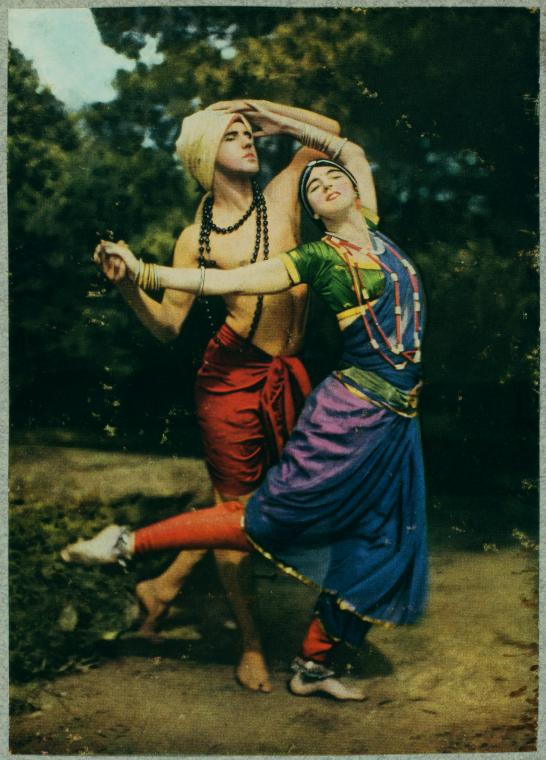
Ruth St. Denis and Ted Shawn, 1916

- The Mexican fast-food chain El Pollo Loco opened its first restaurant in the United States in Westlake.
- Langer's Delicatessen is an "iconic presence" on the southeast corner of 7th and Alvarado streets, which intersection was in 2008 officially named "Langer's Square" by the city. The Jewish deli was founded by Al Langer in 1947 when the neighborhood had a large number of Jewish residents.
- Original Tommy's was opened on May 15, 1946, by Tom Koulax, the son of Greek immigrants, on the northeast corner of Beverly and Rampart boulevards.
- Ruth St. Denis and her husband, Ted Shawn, opened their dance studio, Denishawn, in 1915 at Sixth Street and St. Paul Avenue in Downtown Los Angeles but moved in 1917 to a building fronting Westlake Park. The structure had been vacated by the Westlake School for Girls, which had been founded in the Westlake neighborhood in 1904. The school moved to Holmby Hills in 1927.
- The Westlake Theatre was listed on the National Register of Historic Places in 2009. Opened in 1926, the theater had seating for 1,949 patrons and was used for both motion pictures and vaudeville shows. It is now used as a swap meet.

== Education ==
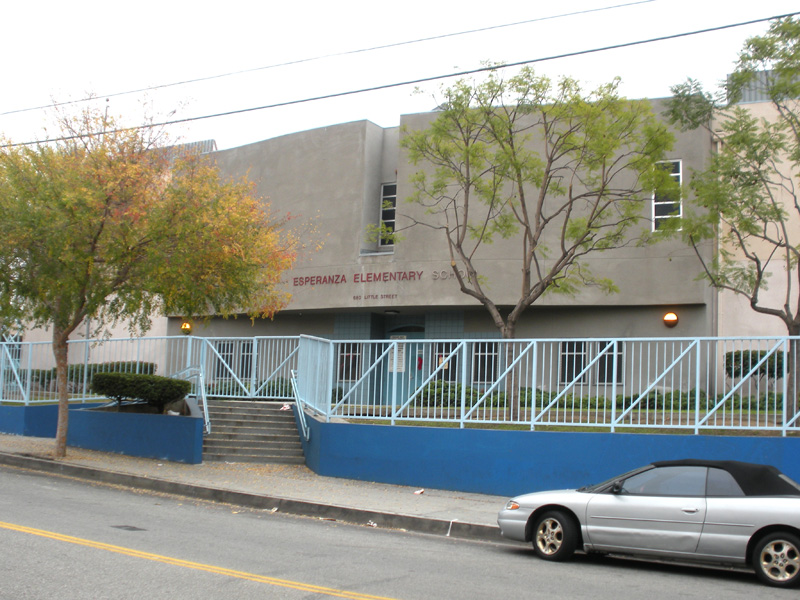
Esperanza Elementary School

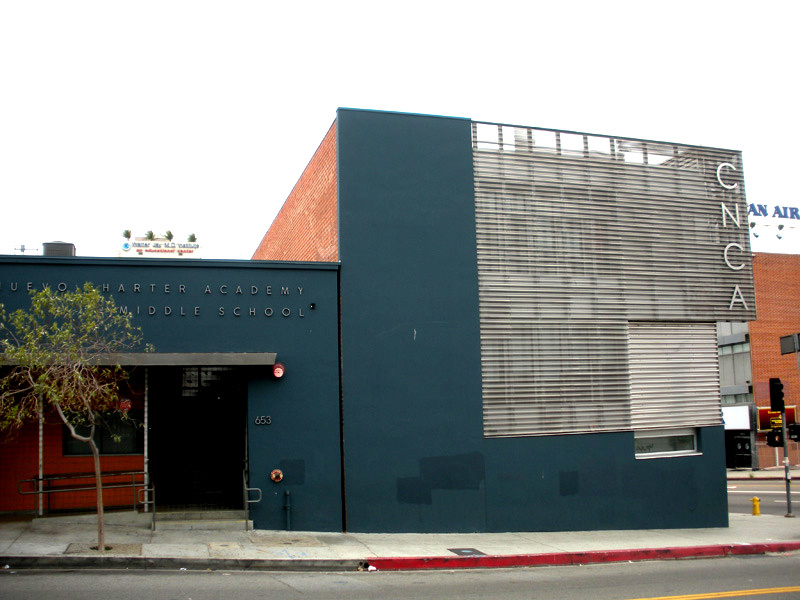
Camino Nuevo Charter School

One-eighth of Westlake residents aged 25 and older had a four-year degree in 2000, a low rate for both the city and the county. The percentage of residents with less than a high school diploma was high for the county.

Schools operating within the Westlake borders are:

- New Village Charter High School, charter, 147 North Occidental Boulevard
- Camino Nuevo Charter Academy, charter, 3500 West Temple Street
- Soledad Enrichment Action Charter High School, charter, 222 North Virgil Avenue
- Los Angeles School of Global Studies, LAUSD secondary, 322 Lucas Avenue
- Harold McAlister High School, LAUSD, 611 South Carondelet Street
- Los Angeles Academy of Arts & Enterprise Charter School, 600 South LaFayette Park Place
- Precious Blood Catholic School, Archdiocese of Los Angeles, TK-8 L.A. 90057
- Pilgrim School, private K-12, 540 South Commonwealth Avenue
- Metropolitan Skill Center, LAUSD adult education, 2801 West Sixth Street
- Belmont Community Adult School, LAUSD, 1575 West Second Street
- ROP Center, LAUSD occupational, 333 South Beaudry Avenue, 18th Floor
- Harris Newmark Continuation School, LAUSDm 134 Witmer Street
- Monsenor Oscar Romero Charter Middle School, charter, 2900 West Temple Street
- John H. Liechty Middle School, LAUSD, 650 South Union Avenue
- Sal Castro Middle School, LAUSD, 1575 West Second Street
- Commonwealth Avenue Elementary School, LAUSD, 215 South Commonwealth Avenue
- Rosemont Avenue Elementary School, LAUSD, 421 North Rosemont Avenue
- Lake Street Primary School, LAUSD, 135 North Lake Street
- Lafayette Park Primary Center, LAUSD, 310 LaFayette Park Place
- Union Avenue Elementary School, LAUSD, 150 South Burlington Avenue
- Equitas Academy Charter School, 631 South Commonwealth Avenue
- MacArthur Park Primary Center, LAUSD elementary, 2300 West Seventh Street
- Hoover Street Elementary School, LAUSD, 2726 Francis Avenue
- Esperanza Elementary School, LAUSD, 680 Little Street
- E. Manfred Evans Community Adult School, LAUSD, 717 North Figueroa Street
- Immaculate Conception Catholic School, K-8 Archdiocese of L.A. 830 Green Avenue
- New Economics Women Academy of Science and Art (NASA or New NASA) Charter School, (PK-5) 379 Loma Dr

== Notable people ==
- Dionisio Botiller, member of the Los Angeles Common Council and city auditor
- Matthew Cooke (filmmaker)
- Steve Downes, radio disc jockey
- Elisha K. Green, member of the Los Angeles Common Council and entrepreneur
- Harrison Gray Otis, publishing executive
- Ella Gross, actress, model and member of South Korean girl group Meovv
- Hiram Sinsabaugh, minister, banker and member of the Los Angeles Common Council
- Edward Falles Spence, entrepreneur and mayor of Los Angeles

== See also ==
- Historic Filipinotown, Los Angeles, referred to as the "northern edge of Westlake"
