= Miguel Contreras Learning Complex =

Coordinates: 34°3′29″N 118°15′37″W

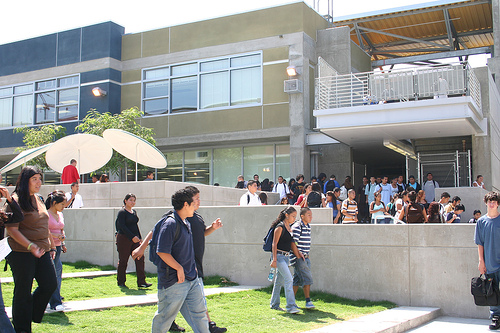
- 322 Lucas Avenue; Los Angeles, California

Information
- Type: Public
- Established: September 5, 2006
- School district: LAUSD
- Principal: Depends on the academy
- Grades: 9-12
- Enrollment: 2,500
- Campus type: Urban
- Colors: Teal, black, & white
- Athletics conference: Central League; CIF Los Angeles City Section
- Mascot: Cobras
- Website: contreraslc.lausd.org

Miguel Contreras Learning Complex (MCLC) is a high school in the Westlake neighborhood of Los Angeles, California, United States.

The school, which serves grades 9 through 12, is a part of the Los Angeles Unified School District. The school is located at 322 South Lucas Avenue, just down Third Street from the LAUSD Board of Education headquarters building. It houses three Small Learning Communities (SLCs): The Academic Leadership Community (ALC), Social Justice, and Business & Tourism (B&T), which is the largest academy.

The complex also holds a separate school called the Los Angeles School Of Global Studies, a New Tech Network school with a focus on project-based learning (PBL). LASGS currently holds an API score of 591.

Contreras was named after Miguel Contreras, a labor union organizer.

== History ==
MCLC opened its doors for the first time on September 5, 2006. Prior to its opening, the school building project was known as Central Los Angeles Area New High School #10. The total budget for this school was over $168 million.

The school took many students who were enrolled in Belmont High School and chose to transfer, as well as students who were unable to attend overcrowded local schools, and had been bussed to nearby schools throughout their entire academic careers. The three Small Learning Communities (SLCs) were originally established at Belmont High School and essentially moved their entire community (teachers and students) to the new complex. The three SLCs were Academic Learning Complex (ALC), Business and Tourism (BT) and Social Justice (SJ). This will be the protocol for other new schools in the area that will aim to relieve the overcrowding at Belmont as it transitions into a 6–12 school.

President of the United States Barack Obama visited the school for a town hall meeting on March 19, 2009, where a large crowd filled the gymnasium.

On January 26, 2022, a 17-year-old boy was stabbed twice during a fistfight on the third floor of the complex. He was transported to LAC+USC Medical Center in stable condition.

On September 8, 2024, a student’s body was found dead in the school’s swimming pool. No further details were revealed and no cause of death was determined.

== Neighborhoods served ==
Areas served by Contreras include portions of the Pico-Union and Westlake, Angelino Heights, Chinatown, Koreatown, Echo Park, and Little Tokyo areas.

MCLC & LASGS and Belmont share the same attendance boundary and are separate schools which are called pilot schools.
