= Westlake Theatre =

- U.S. National Register of Historic Places
- Los Angeles Historic-Cultural Monument
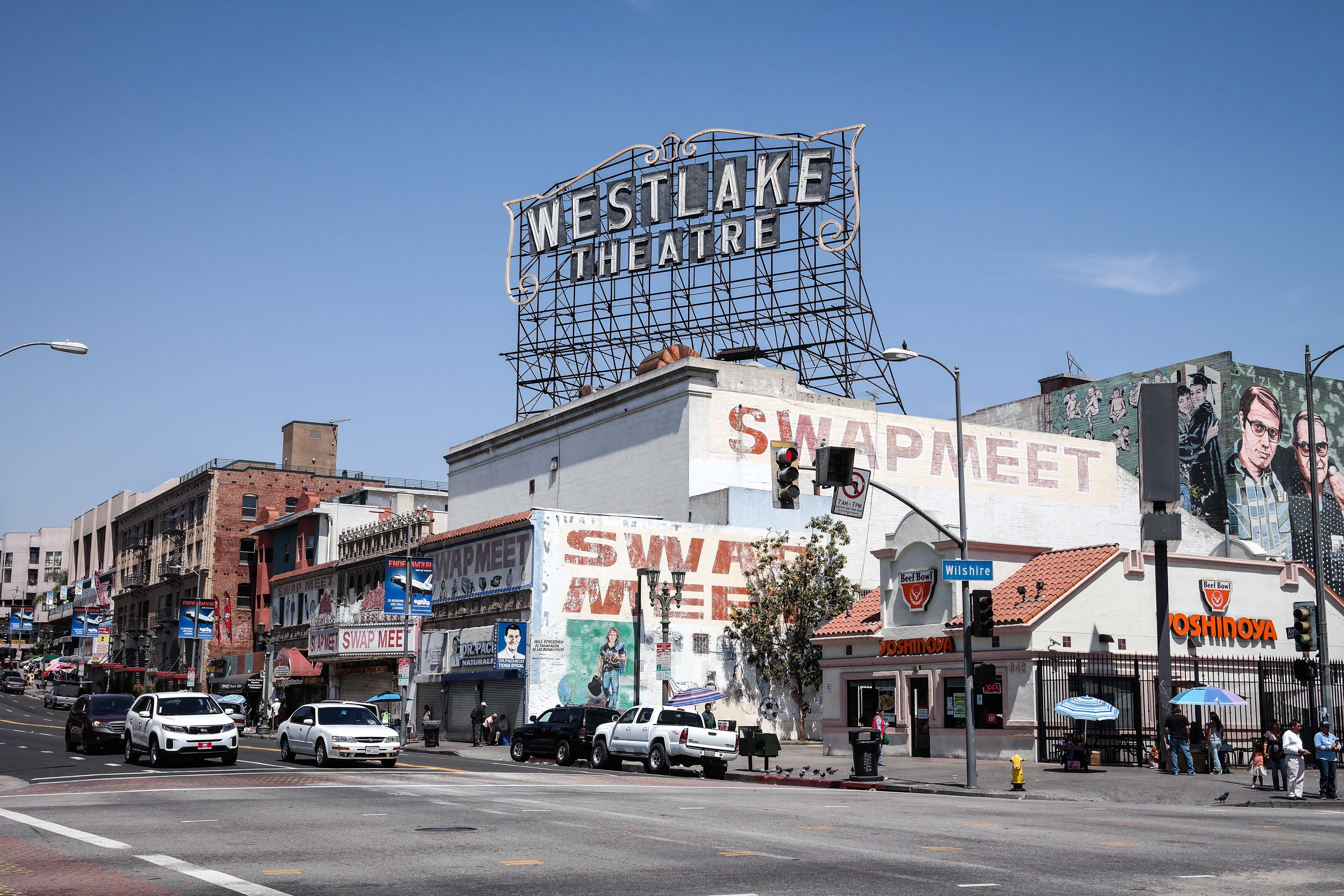
- Westlake Theatre, April 2014

- Location within the Los Angeles metropolitan area Location within California Location within the United States
- Location: 634-642 S. Alvarado St. Los Angeles, California
- Coordinates: 34°03′30.01″N 118°16′31.32″W
- Built: 1926
- Architect: Richard D. Bates, Jr. (original structure); S. Charles Lee (renovation)
- Architectural style: California Churrigueresque (Spanish Colonial Revival)
- NRHP reference No.: 09001200
- LAHCM No.: 546

Significant dates
- Added to NRHP: January 7, 2010
- Designated LAHCM: September 24, 1991

The Westlake Theatre is a historic theater located in the Westlake section of Los Angeles, California, United States, adjacent to MacArthur Park. The theater was listed on the National Register of Historic Places in 2009.

Opened on September 22, 1926, the theater had seating for 1,949 patrons, and was used for both motion pictures and vaudeville shows. It was built at a reported cost of $750,000. It was designed by Richard Mortimer Bates Jr., with an exterior in a Mission/Spanish Colonial Revival style. The facade features Churrigueresque detailing of floral patterns and cartouche relief. The interior contains Adamesque references and murals by Anthony Heinsbergen.

The theater closed briefly during the Depression for renovations. Exterior renovations in 1935 were designed by noted theater architect S. Charles Lee, and included an Art Deco ticket kiosk made of red-painted metal, unvarnished aluminum and glass; new lobby doors; and terrazzo sunburst paving in the foyer and front sidewalk. One of the theater's intact features is an original steel-frame, three-story neon sign on its roof.

The Westlake was operated as a first-run movie theater from 1926 until the 1960s. As the neighborhood's demographics changed, the theater was sold to Metropolitan Theatres Corp., which showed Spanish-language or Spanish-subtitled movies. In 1991, the building was sold to Mayer Separzadeh, who converted the theater into a swap meet. To protect the building from drastic changes, the building was declared a Los Angeles Historic-Cultural Monument in September 1991.

The theater was purchased by the now-defunct Community Redevelopment Agency of the City of Los Angeles in 2008. The CRA announced plans to rehabilitate the theater as a venue for live theater, film, music, and other performances. Progress under the CRA/LA was slow.

In 2018, the theater was sold for $2 million to Jamison Services, a real estate development company based in Koreatown, which said it had plans to restore the theater. However, as of 2019 the theatre was once again listed for sale, and by 2020 Jamison Services had done no more than apply for permits to alter and repaint the building's exterior.

== See also ==
- National Register of Historic Places listings in Los Angeles, California
- List of Los Angeles Historic-Cultural Monuments in the Wilshire and Westlake areas
