= Historic Filipinotown, Los Angeles =

Historic Filipinotown
- Neighborhood of Los Angeles
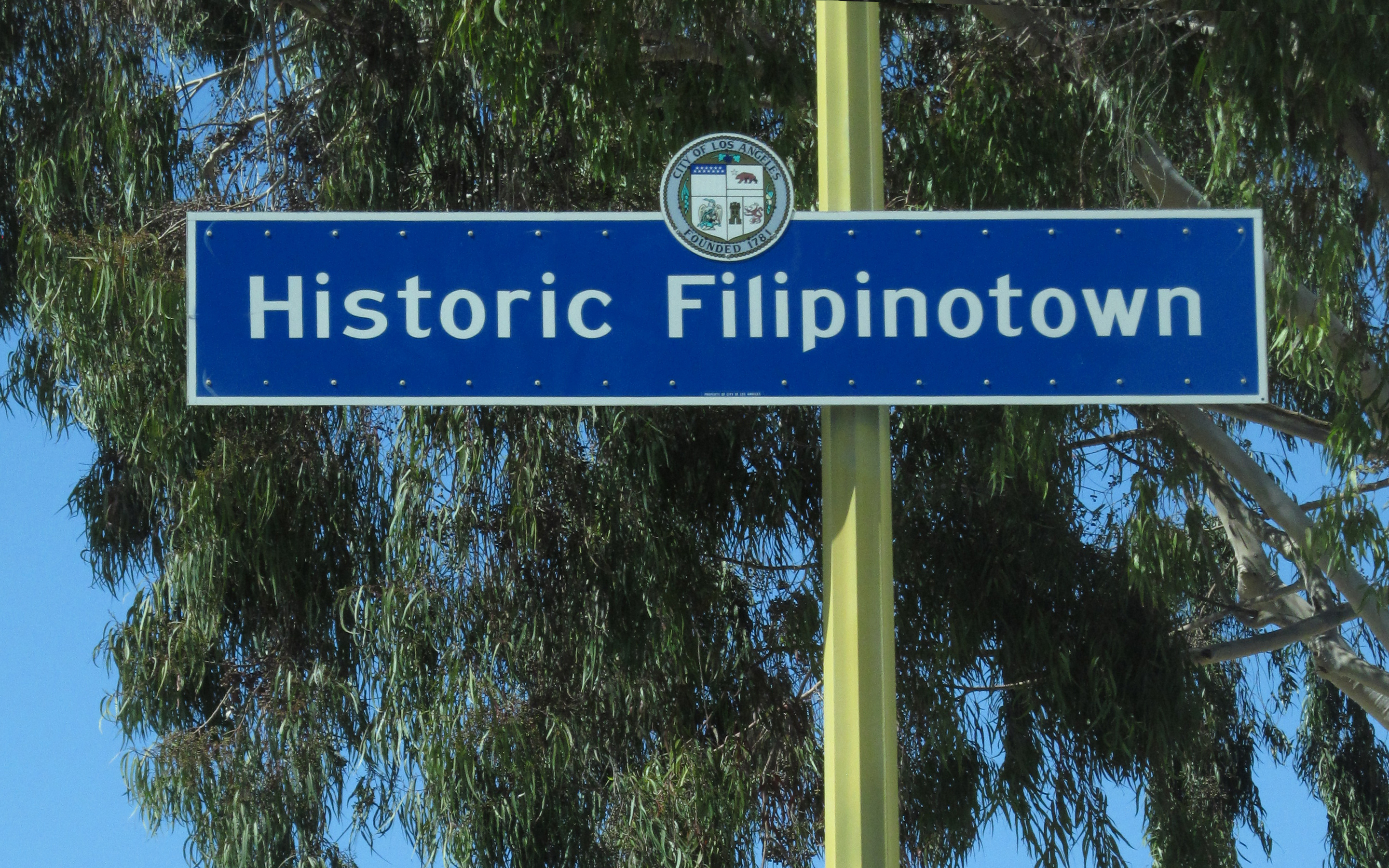
- Historic Filipinotown neighborhood sign located at the intersection of Beverly Boulevard and Belmont Avenue
- Nickname: HiFi
- Location within Los Angeles
- Coordinates: 34°04′19″N 118°16′23″W
- Country: United States of America
- State: California
- County: Los Angeles
- Time zone: Pacific
- Zip Code: 90026
- Area code: 323

Historic Filipinotown (alternately known as HiFi) is a neighborhood in the city of Los Angeles.

In 2008, it was one of the five Asian Pacific Islander neighborhoods (Chinatown, Little Tokyo, Historic Filipinotown, Koreatown, and Thai Town) in the city that received federal recognition as a Preserve America neighborhood.

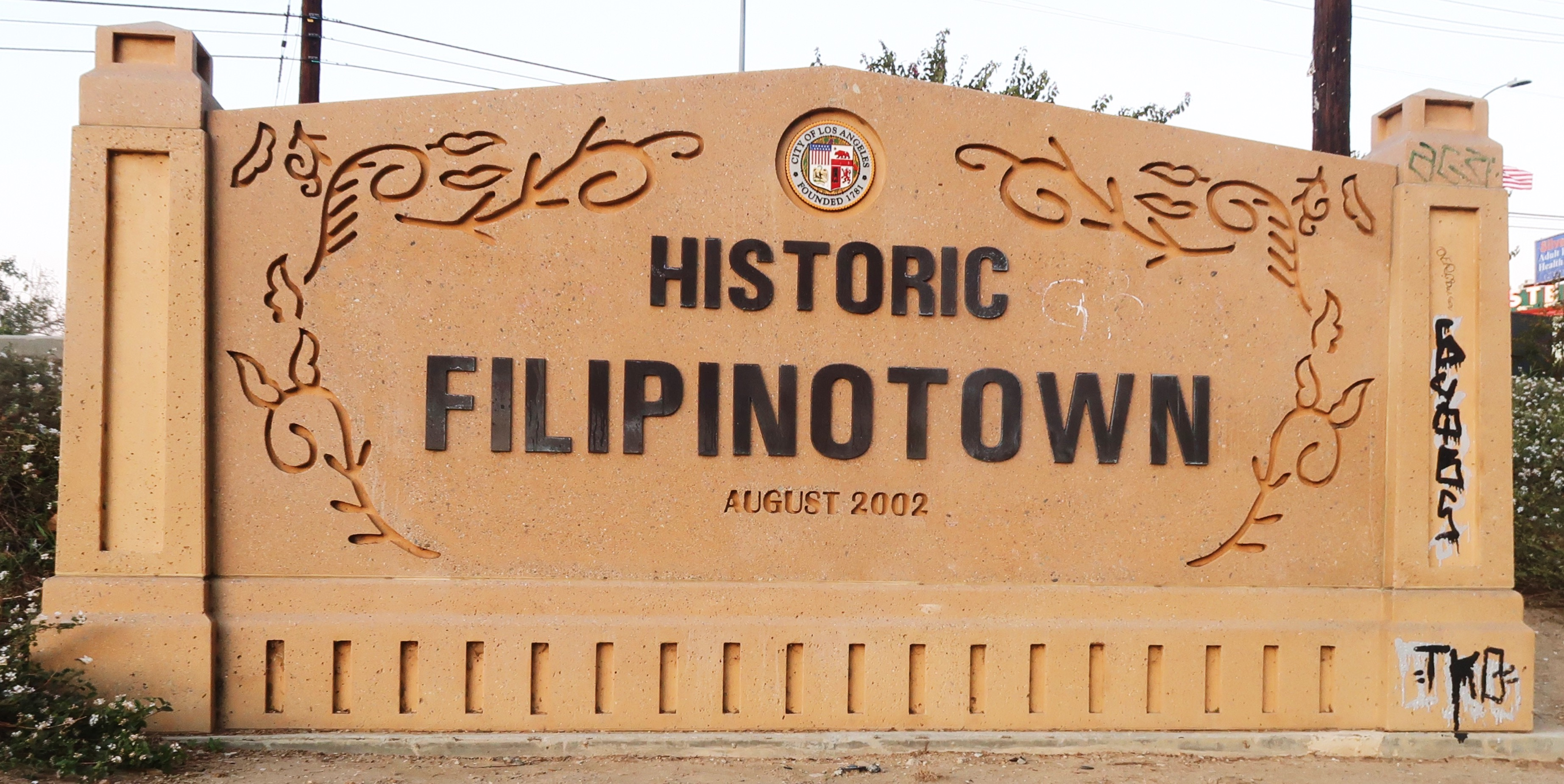
Signage located at Temple Street and the 101 Freeway.

== Geography ==
On July 31, 2002, the City of Los Angeles designated Historic Filipinotown with the following boundaries: on the east by Glendale Boulevard, on the north by the 101 Freeway, on the west by Hoover Street, and on the south by Beverly Boulevard. The area, located in Council District 13, had commonly been referred to as the "Temple-Beverly Corridor". Both the Department of Public Works and the Department of Transportation were instructed in install signage to identify "Historic Filipinotown". Neighborhood signage was installed at the intersection of Temple Street and Hoover Street and Beverly Boulevard and Belmont Avenue. In 2006, Historic Filipinotown signage was installed along the 101 Freeway at the Alvarado Street exit.

== History ==
In a section of downtown Los Angeles now known as Little Tokyo, that displaced the original little Manila, a Filipino community known as Little Manila existed and flourished for over two decades (1920s-40s). The first significant wave of Filipino migration came in 1923. However, Filipinos were already in Los Angeles as early as its very foundation, as a certain Antonio Miranda Rodríguez, a skilled gunsmith of Filipino descent from Manila was one of the original founders of Los Angeles city, however after arriving in Los Angeles, was then shortly reassigned to nearby Santa Barbara which was a fortress that needed his gun-smithing skills more. As for the first major migration in 1923, for when over 2,000 arrived in California. Ten years later, over 6,000 resided in Los Angeles, most living in the downtown neighborhood bordered by San Pedro Street to the east, Sixth Street to the south, Figueroa Street to the west, and Sunset Boulevard to the North. Twelve restaurants, seven barbershops, the immigrant newspaper The Philippines Review and the Manila Portrait Studio all helped to buoy the Los Angeles Filipino diaspora. Many of the Filipino pioneers came to Los Angeles to study, while others settled as residents for employment. This community of mostly males established numerous restaurants, pool halls, cafés, employment agencies and barbershops which became the hub where Filipinos congregated, lived, socialized, organized and networked among their compatriots to find companionship, fellowship and work. One would merely drive to First and Main Streets to solicit Filipinos, either by Hollywood studios in need of ethnic-type extras for cinematic productions or many others in need of cheap labor.

By the early 1950s, Filipinos were able to buy land in the United States. In Los Angeles, many Filipino families bought their first homes in the Temple-Beverly corridor, with the growth of Filipino families in this corridor, they created Filipino-owned businesses, establishments, churches, and organizations.

Despite the fact that there are other enclaves of Filipinos living outside Historic Filipinotown (Carson, Long Beach, Glendale, Cerritos, West Covina, Panorama City, and Eagle Rock), this neighborhood was named "Historic Filipinotown" because it was one of the few areas where Filipinos first settled during the early part of the 20th century and home to key Filipino organizations, Filipino churches (Filipino Christian Church, Iglesia ni Kristo, St. Columban Filipino Catholic Church, United Church of God Ministries, Praise Christian Fellowship and Congregational Christian Church), housing (Manila Terrace, Mindanao Towers, Mountain View Terrace, and Villa Ramos), and social service centers. Many Filipino American families began purchasing homes and establishing businesses in the area beginning from the 1940s, shifting away from the downtown area now known as Little Tokyo in the 1920s and later the Bunker Hill area. The "Historic" label was added to recognize the area as a gateway and the current place where Filipino immigrants establish themselves, create businesses and have community-based activities. This was because the Filipino American community in Historic Filipinotown created a partnership with mayor Eric Garcetti, as a result, he maintained a staff position assigned to the Historic Filipinotown neighborhood during his tenure.

In 1985, the Pilipino American Reading Room and Library (PARRAL) was established in a church basement. Founded by Helen Agcaoili Summers Brown, the collection grew to include more than 6,000 books, articles, and photographs that reflected the Filipino experience in America. In January 2000, PARRAL was relocated to Temple Street where it was renamed the Filipino American Library. While the library eventually was closed down, in 2017 its collection was split between the USC Libraries and the Echo Park Library Branch. The Echo Park Branch Library houses over 1,000 books, in English, Tagalog, and other Filipino dialects, that highlight Filipino life and culture, therefore making it the only public library in the Southern California region to have a Filipino heritage collection.

On November 2, 2010, the intersection at Temple Street and Alvarado Boulevard was named as "Remedios 'Remy' V. Geaga Square," and the Department of Transportation was directed to erect a permanent ceremonial sign at the location. A resident of Historic Filipinotown, Geaga dedicated her life to end discrimination in employment, education, and housing.

On October 31, 2011, Historic Filipinotown was officially recognized as a Preserve America community after years of advocacy by the Pilipino American Network and Advocacy (PANA) and other community advocates. Receiving this honor from former First Lady and Honorary Chair of the Preserve America Initiative, Michelle Obama, Historic Filipinotown is provided with strong federal support and incentives for the continued preservation of cultural and natural heritage resources.

== Demographics ==
In 2010, Hispanic or Latino Americans constituted approximately 66% of the population. Asian Americans and Pacific Islanders comprised about 25% – with Filipinos as the largest Asian American Pacific Islander (AAPI) subgroup. Of the 25% of Asian Americans that resided in Historic Filipinotown at the time of the survey, 64% were Filipino. Non-Hispanic Whites and Black Americans each constituted 4% of the neighborhood.

== Community organizations ==
There are several advocacy organizations located within the boundaries of Historic Filipinotown area.

=== Search to Involve Pilipino Americans (SIPA) ===
Search to Involve Pilipino Americans (SIPA) was founded in 1972 and helps to provide health and human services as well as helps in the economic development, arts and cultural programs for youth and families in Filipinotown and the greater Los Angeles Fil-Am community. SIPA's indigenous values include KAPWA (humankind), KARANGALAN (honor), KAPAKANAN (well-being), and KATARGUNGAN (social justice). As per these pillars, SIPA's major contributions to the HiFi community include but are not limited to affordable housing, youth programs, mental health services, and health & wellness resources.

As of March 2024, SIPA has expanded from one to two locations, recently expanding a new well-being center at the new Lucena on Court. SIPA HQ, located within HiFi Collective is located at 3200 W. Temple Street.

=== Filipino American Services Group, Inc. (FASGI) ===
FASGI is located on 135 North Park View Street. It was incorporated in 1981, is a "community based on non-profit social service agency that focuses on the health and well being of underserved adults, particularly senior citizens…"

=== Filipino American Community of Los Angeles, Inc. (FACLA) ===
FALCA is located at 1740 W. Temple Street, It was originally founded as the Filipino Unity Council in 1930, the Filipino American Community of Los Angeles. It housed the Filipino Cultural Center .

=== Pilipino Workers Center (PWC) ===
Established in 1997, the PWC is located at 153 Glendale Boulevard. The Pilipino Workers Center aims to "secure the dignity and safety of the Pilipinx community in Southern California and build labor leaders in the domestic worker industry".

=== Pilipino American Network and Advocacy (PANA) ===
PANA was founded to advocate for the economic and political empowerment of Filipinos in Los Angeles County. The organization, with the help of the Filipino community, successfully advocated for the designation of Historic Filipinotown as a Preserve America Community with the US Federal government in 2011.

== Events ==
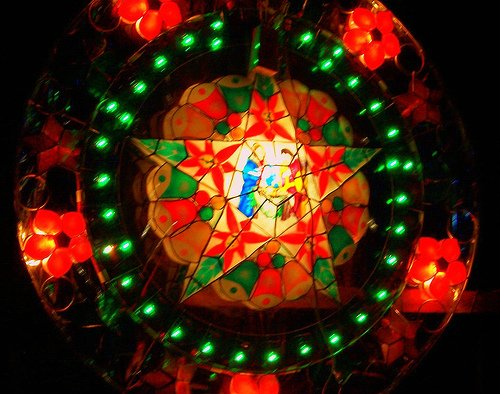
Parols (Christmas lanterns) are installed along Temple Street.

- Annual Historic Filipinotown Festival - the event includes foods, craft, educational activities and a 5K run.
- Annual Philippine Independence Day Parade and Festival - the parade spans several blocks. At the end of the parade, there is a festival area with a performance stage.
- Annual Larry Itliong Day - Unidad Park hosts an annual Larry Itliong Day event over the weekend of October 25, which falls on Larry Itliong's birth date. This cultural festival, honoring Filipino American labor leader Larry Itliong, officially began as a state-wide commemoration in 2015. The first three celebrations (2015–2017) were called "The Annual Larry Itliong Day Parade and Festival" and were sponsored by the City of Los Angeles Department of Cultural Affairs (DCA) Arts Activation Fund (AAF). From 2018 onward the commemoration has simply been known as Larry Itliong Day.
- Annual Polemount Parol Lighting - Local business and family-sponsored parols (Christmas lanterns) line Temple Street to coinciding with festivities in the Philippines. Parols are constructed to resemble the star of Bethlehem and its role as a light to guide the three wise men.

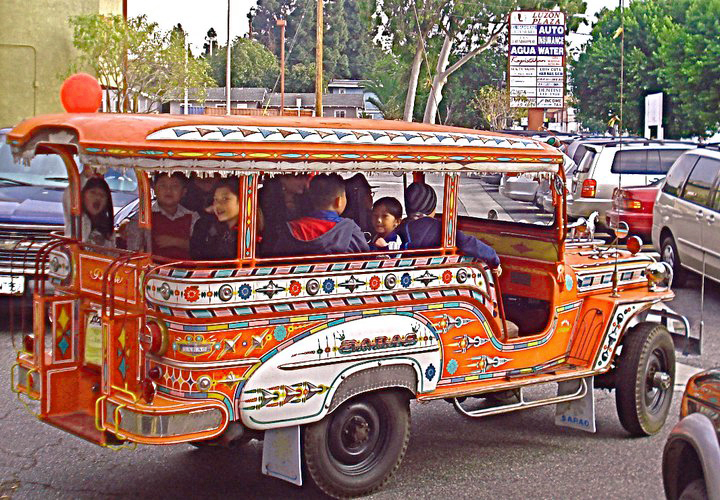
The PWC Jeepney tours Filipinotown

- Hidden HiFi - The Pilipino Workers Center (PWC) in partnership with LA-based social enterprise Public Matters, hosts an event called Hidden HiFi which promotes events and Jeepney tours.
- Sunday Jump - a monthly open mic series primarily held at PWC's community halls. It was designated by the Department of Cultural Affairs as one of the cultural treasures of Historic Filipinotown.
- Baryo HiFi - The first Historic Filipinotown Festival at Beverly Boulevard in AAPI Heritage Month's celebration on May 4, 2024, "commemorates the Filipino community's cultural significance over Greater Los Angeles." The event includes performances by Yeek, Rini, Esta, and SoSuperSam performances, Kristofferson San Pablo art exhibit, rapper P-Lo and DJ Noodles. "The best of Filipino food" offers The Park's Finest, Lasita, Big Boi, Jollibee, and Wanderlust Creamery.

== Landmarks ==
=== Filipino Christian Church and St. Columban Filipino Catholic Church ===
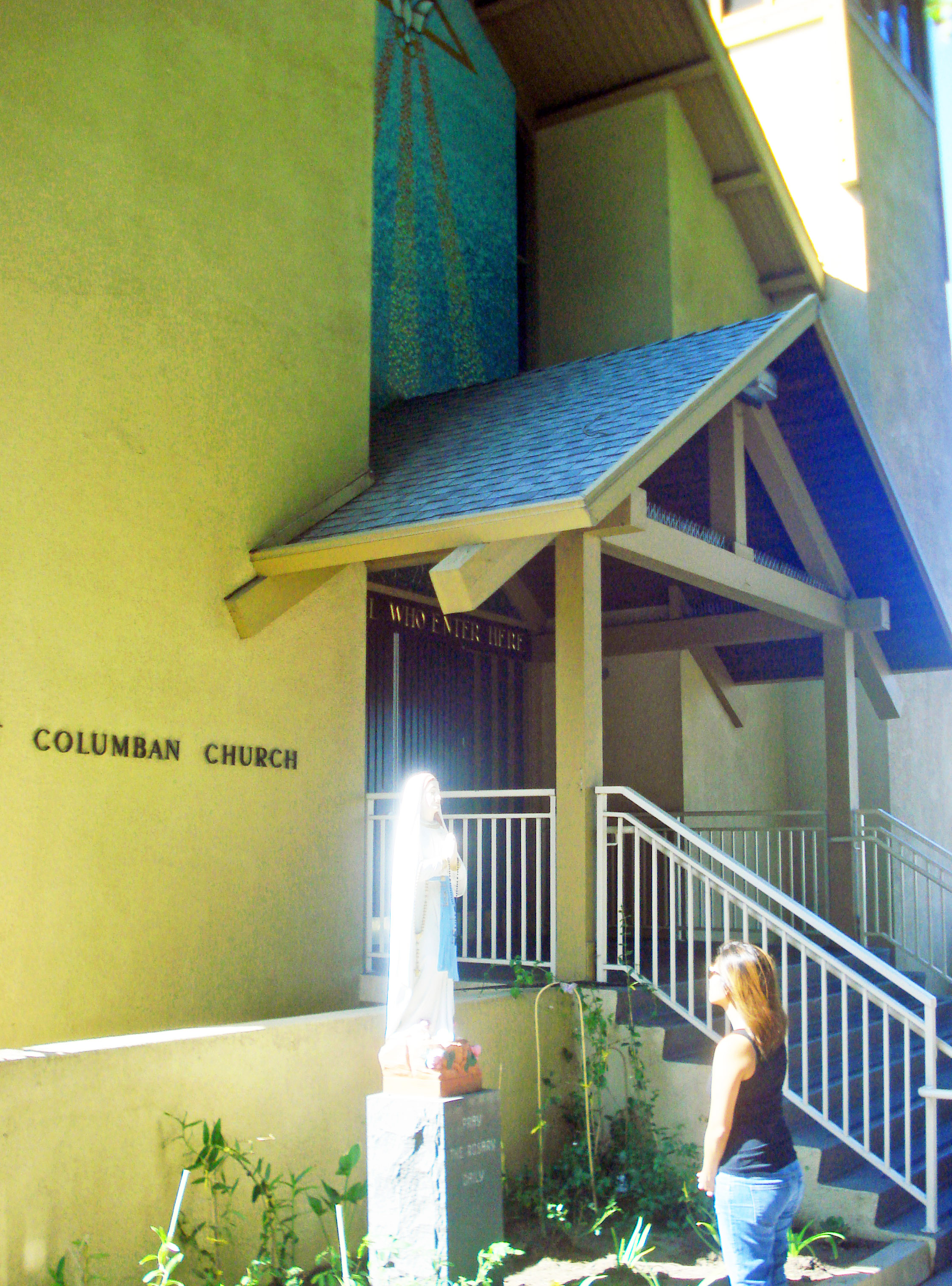
St. Columban Filipino Catholic Church, the nation's oldest 'Filipino' Catholic Church

On May 5, 1998, the Los Angeles City Council designated the Filipino Christian Church as Los Angeles Historic-Cultural Monument No. 651.

The Filipino (Disciples) Christian Church is the only historic cultural monument designated by the City of Los Angeles with Filipino origins, distinguished by its German Gothic Revival and Craftsman architecture. The Disciples of Christ State Board adopted the work with the Filipinos as its mission and called on Rev. and Mrs. Frank Stipp, former missionaries to the Ilocos provinces, to oversee the work. Through them and the Disciples of Christ State Board, a center was later started when the Disciples secured for the Filipino Christian Fellowship four bungalows complete with apartment facilities and a place of worship located at First Street and Bunker Hill, where the Los Angeles Music Center and Walt Disney Concert Hall stand today. It is believed that these quarters sparked the start of what is known now as Historic Filipinotown. Having been the earliest Christian church established to cater to Filipino Americans, many key organizations in the area germinated from this church, including SIPA and the Filipino American Library.

In 2019, the Filipino Christian Church was listed in the National Register of Historic Places by the National Park Service.

Purchased in part by funds donated by Philippines First Lady Aurora Quezon as a gift to the Filipinos in Los Angeles, the St. Columban Filipino Church on Beverly Blvd and Loma Drive has authentic church bells from the City of Antipolo, Philippines. The church sits on Crown Hill, one of the five hills that circled early downtown Los Angeles. In the 1890s, Crown Hill was the epicenter of a massive oil boom when Edward L. Doheny and Charles A. Canfield bought a lot at Colton Street and Glendale Boulevard and, in November 1892, they struck oil.

=== Gintong Kasaysayan, Gintong Pamana mural ===
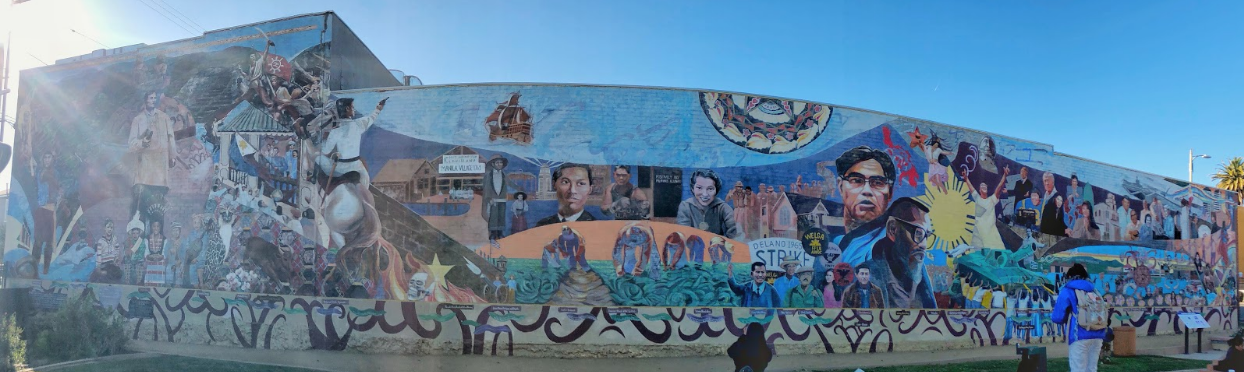
The Filipino American mural in Unidad Park.

Before the area was designated as Historic Filipinotown, the nation's largest Filipino American mural, Gintong Kasaysayan, Gintong Pamana (Filipino Americans: A Glorious History, A Golden legacy), was unveiled on June 24, 1995. The mural promotes ethnic solidarity and the fight for historical inclusion of the 'forgotten' or 'invisible' Filipinos in American history. For example, the mural includes Larry Itliong who challenged young Filipino American activists to organize themselves to fight for equality in the 1960s and fought alongside Cesar Chavez to lead the Delano Grape Strike groups. The mural also includes apl.de.ap, who is a hip hop performer, rapper, producer, and composer.

In 1997, the City of Los Angeles Board of Cultural Affairs Commissioners awarded the mural its first ever Award of Design Excellence for public art. The mural was likewise featured in Los Angeles County Museum of Art's "Made in California: Art, Image and Identity 1900-2000", the Smithsonian Institution's traveling exhibition celebrating 100 years of Filipino migration to the United States called "Singgalot (The Ties That Bind): From Colonial Subjects to Citizens" and the Smithsonian Traveling Exhibition "I Want the Wide American Earth" honoring the history and contributions of Asian and Pacific Islanders in the United States. The mural was painted by then 22-year-old artist Eliseo Art Silva while a junior attending Otis College of Art and Design. According to the artist, "...the mural encapsulates 5,000 years of Filipino and Filipino American history; the design is divided into two parts: the first is historical (represented by the outline of a fish at sea), leading up to the awakening of Filipino national and political consciousness; the second part is dominated by a huge bird with significant Filipino-Americans on its wings, the farm workers on the bottom left and the youth and community on the right."

In 2012, the mural underwent a six-month restoration process that included the addition of several more historical figures and events. A re-dedication ceremony was help in May 2012 to honor the mural's legacy within the community. In 2021, the mural underwent another wave of restoration to protect the integrity of the art, primarily against graffiti.

=== Unidad Park and Community Garden ===
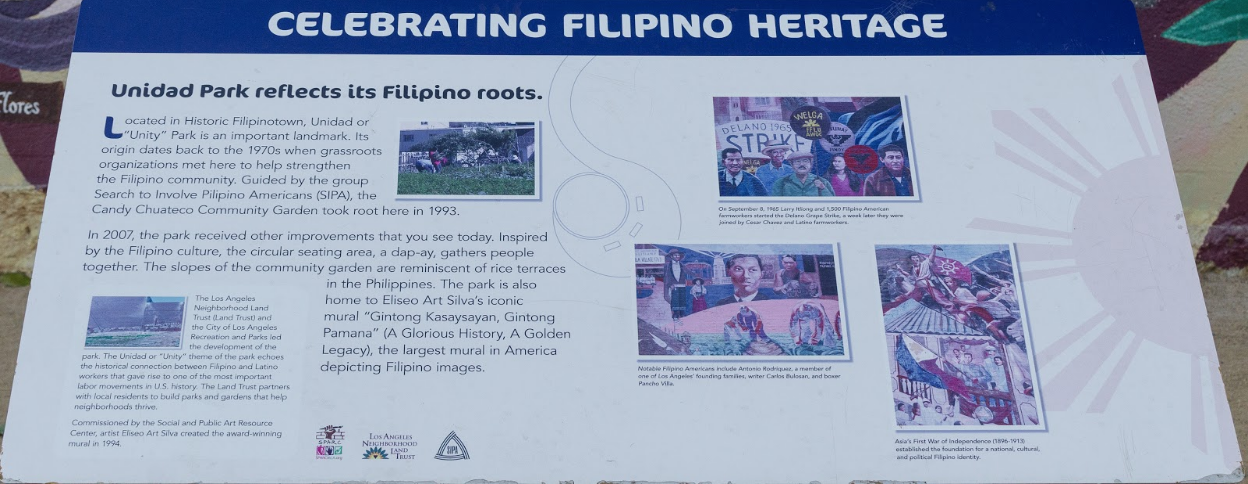
An informational kiosk that stands in front of the Gintong Kasaysayan, Gintong Pamana mural in Unidad Park which provides a brief history of the park, community garden and mural.

The mural originally faced a large community garden called the Candy Chuateco Community Garden. Sponsored by Search to Involve Pilipino Americans, the land was purchased by the City of Los Angeles and converted into the Unidad Park through the Los Angeles Neighborhood Land Trust (LANLT). Unidad Park's design was conceptualized by leaders and stakeholders of the Filipino community, which includes the Philippine Bontoc/Kankana-ey communal gathering place, park features and a community garden referencing the Rice Terraces of the Philippine Cordilleras, a UNESCO World Heritage Site, as well as an entrance walkway inspired by the popularized knotted yo-yo, which was invented by Filipino immigrant Pedro Flores. The park is a destination for the neighborhood with its Dap-ay used by students and the sandbox inside this space used by toddlers, the interactive play area, community garden as well as onsite barbecue grills with matching tables and benches for family gatherings and parties, enhanced by a covered tent to protect park users from the sun and rain. The park is the nation's first and only public park that is dedicated to the contributions of Filipino historical figures and it was consistently used to host the annual Larry D. Itliong Day celebration.

=== Street medallions, banners and crosswalks ===
The crosswalks in Filipinotown have been decorated with traditional Filipino basket-weaving patterns designed by Edwin Frederizo, who also designed the district's street banners. "My design for the permanent art display conveys a message of peace, unity, and harmony amongst the community of Historic Filipinotown. The uniqueness of having Filipino American residents and businesses embedded within a variety of cultures allows for a very rich and conceptual visual art display. The Filipino American culture is influenced by several other cultures (Latino, Chinese and African American) and is fused into a very unique style all its own."

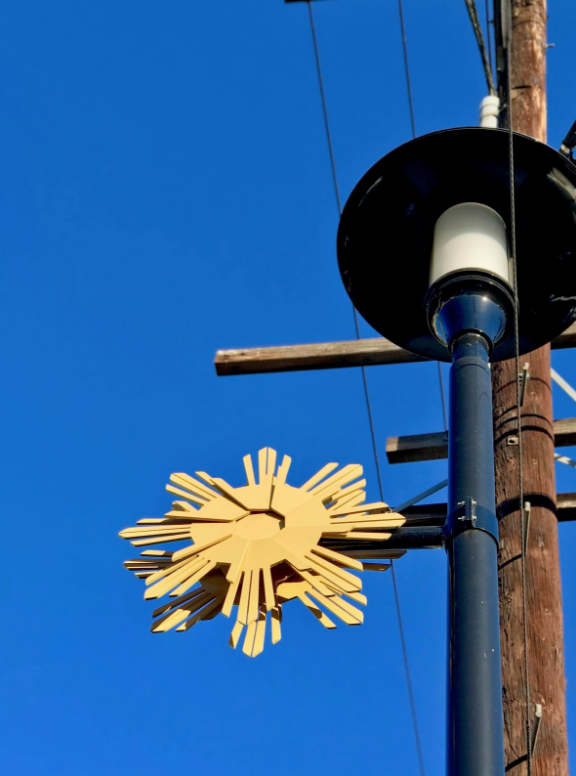
Streetlight art titled "Kapwa: Shared Humanity - All Hands In."

Along the streets of Historic Filipinotown are lamp posts adorned with Filipino cultural medallions. These medallions decorate the tops of lamp posts with different symbols. Roel Punzalan is the artist who designed the streetlight art. His vision for the project was to tie the Filipino values of "kapwa," "lakbay," and "kapayapaan" to the unique interaction of Filipino culture and Historic Filipinotown. The streetlight art served both as an educational opportunity to share Filipino culture and history and as a way to improve pedestrian safety. Streetlights were placed at 17 different intersections, and about 54 lamp posts were adorned with Punzalan's art.

The Filipino cultural values can be defined as: "kapwa" is "shared humanity or togetherness," "lakbay" is "journey," and "kapayapaan" is "peace". These are the descriptions for each streetlight art:

- "Kapwa: Shared Humanity - ALL HANDS IN. The Filipino Sun, a symbol of unity, is created by stacking hands in a team huddle, a gesture of unity."
- "Lakbay: Journey - BUILD BRIDGES. Two figures holding hands to form a bridge symbolizes both the journey to America and the relationships that are created among the various people after they arrive."
- "Kapayapaan: Peace - EMBRACE PEACE. The parol, a star-shaped lantern symbolizing the Filipino Christmas, is created by interlocking figures in a group hug as a reminder of peace throughout the year."

Punzalan explained that the streetlights highlight the importance of humanity in the Filipino culture and that the people are essential for the culture to last through the challenges and passage of time.

=== Filipino American WWII Veterans Memorial ===
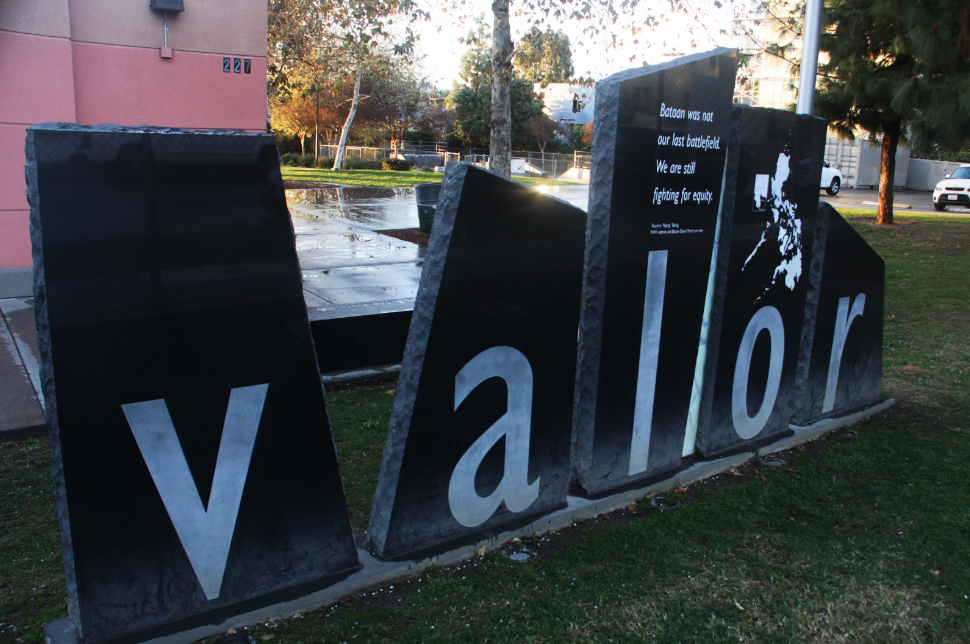
Filipino American WWII Veterans Memorial

Prior to the installation of the memorial, a Veteran's Day Parade was held in the community to honor and advocate for World War II Filipino and Filipino-American veterans. The 2003 parade was hosted by the People's Community Organization for Reform and Empowerment (CORE) and the office of, then council member, Eric Garcetti. In November 2006, Eric Garcetti, then-president of the Los Angeles City Council, joined Filipino veterans from around the country in unveiling the first monument dedicated to the 250,000 Filipino and 7,000 Filipino American soldiers who fought for the United States in World War II. The monument, located in Lake Street Park in the heart of Historic Filipinotown, consists of five slabs of polished black granite and commemorates the history of the Filipino veterans, from WWII to immigration to their subsequent fight for equality. It was designed by artist Cheri Gaulke and the project was led by Joe Bernardo, a former staffer of Eric Garcetti. Inscribed in the front of the memorial is the quote, "Bataan was not our last battlefield. We are still fighting for equity," by Faustino "Peping" Baclig. Baclig, a survivor of the Bataan death march and longtime leader of the movement to gain financial and medical benefits for the veterans comments on the longstanding battle that the Filipino community would face to gain recognition and equality in the country.

=== Iglesia ni Cristo (INC) Los Angeles Locale Congregation ===
Located at 141 North Union Avenue, the Iglesia ni Cristo is a Filipino Non-Trinitarian Sect founded in Manila, Philippines in 1914. The group started their overseas mission in 1968. The Los Angeles congregation was one of the earliest locales to be established in the United States after Ewa Beach in Hawaii and San Francisco. It is also one of a few sites in the neighborhood with Filipino vernacular architecture. The facade and spires of this chapel were inspired by the Filipino headgear known as salakot.

=== Talang Gabay - Our Guiding Star: HIFI Eastern Gateway Monument ===
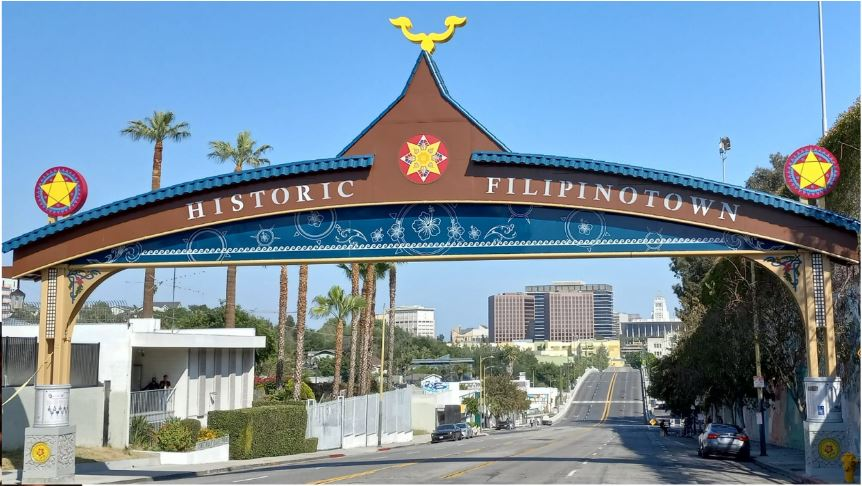
This welcome arch marks the eastern entrance to the neighborhood and is the first of its kind

Standing 30' tall and 82' wide, this welcome arch to the eastern boundary of the neighborhood is the largest gateway edifice of its kind and the largest monument built to honor Filipino Americans in the United States. The gateway features numerous design elements including the Parol; the Gumamela flower also known as hibiscus, which pays tribute to frontline workers of the COVID-19 Pandemic; and the Sarimanok – all symbols with deep roots in Filipino culture. Designed by Eliseo Art Silva with Celestino Geronimo Jr, the name of the new landmark was culled from the Philippine's own iconic symbol: the Jose Rizal Monument which was named "Motto Stella" (Latin: Guiding Star). The peak of the arch is reminiscent of precolonial Filipino palaces such as the Torogan which also replicates the masts of boats used in the Philippines, which typically have bird motifs perched on top. Additionally, the two ends of the boat are representative of Naga, a mythological sea creature that provides safe passage to sailors. Silva wanted to use imagery that represented homecoming to showcase how Historic Filipinotown provided community and refuge to so many Filipinos in Los Angeles. "When our ancient seafarers see birds in flight, it's like a signal that home is near," he explains. "It's the guiding star. That's what the gateway is symbolizing."

=== Filipino Designs and Vernacular Architecture in HIFI ===
Clustered within the vicinity of Beverly-Union are the oldest Filipino Churches of Los Angeles: The Filipino Christian Church (FCC), St. Columban Filipino Catholic Church and the Iglesia Ni Cristo (INC) Kapilya (chapel). These sites are legacies of Filipino Americans who arrived prior to the passage of the Immigration and Nationality Act of 1965 which triggered a population boom, attracting skilled labor to the United States. FCC and St. Columban both have entrances that include stylized "Naga/Bakunawa" rooftop end-beam motifs typical of "Bahay ng Maginoo" precolonial wooden longhouses platformed on stilts built for the "Maginoo" (Nobility) class of pre-Hispanic Philippines. The INC "Kapilya" (Chapel/Cathedral) on Union Avenue has a facade and spires inspired by the Filipino headgear known as salakot. Also within this enclave is Unidad Park which combines the Cordillera Dap-ay (learning circle/gathering place), the entrance walkway shaped like a Yo-yo, the terraced community garden honoring the Rice Terraces of the Philippines and with the building-sized Filipino mural serving as a backdrop to these Filipino design elements.

Further east on Glendale Blvd is Larry Itliong Village Apartments, which is also the main headquarters of the Pilipino Worker's Center. This site combines three Filipino design elements: the "piloti" which was first introduced to this country during the 18th Century by Filipino settlers of St. Malo and Manila Village who built houses made of wood and platformed on stilts; the four inter-woven red bars above the main entrance which pays homage to Filipino baskets, ethnic weaving, the commoner's house (bahay kubo which was essentially built like a basket), and the bamboo dance known as "Tinikling"; with the sun with eight rays of the Philippine flag completing the Filipino branding of the site. The piloti can also be detected at Luzon Plaza Mall along Temple Street, which was named after the largest island of the Philippines. The Spanish-Era Bahay na Bato (House of Stone), which evolved from the precolonial wooden palacial long houses of Filipino Nobility known as "Bahay ng Maginoo", is showcased at the Manila Terrace Apartments along Temple St. The commoner's house called "Bahay Kubo" (nipa hut) can be seen at the Kubo Restaurant at the Corner of Temple St. and Parkview Street. Its teal-green bamboo-tiled roof design elements inspired the proposed design of the projected Eastern Gateway of Historic Filipinotown.

The "Bahay Kubo" vernacular architecture is also evident in the design of the Filipino Cultural Center owned by the Filipino American Community of Los Angeles (FACLA) which proudly extols the Philippine Flag 24/7 in front of its building along Temple Street. Also along Temple Street are 54 bus stops with Filipino lanterns known as Parol and the Philippine Sun of the national flag integrated into the lamp posts. The Western Gateway Marker on the western boundary of the neighborhood integrates the "calado" embroidery with floral and vine motif of the "barong tagalog" and "Maria Clara" national attire of Filipinos on the facade; as well as the "Bakunawa" (Filipino Dragon) (which are carved into both sides of the marker) serving as guardians of the ancient kingdoms of the Philippines in the past, and the HIFI neighborhood of Los Angeles in the present.

In conjunction with the four-month Christmas Season in the Philippines, some of the 10,000 Filipino residents of HIFI display the Parol (Filipino lanterns) in front of their windows or homes as early as September (though most do so after Thanksgiving Day) all the way until the first Sunday of January the following year.

== Education ==
=== Schools ===
The following LAUSD schools lie within the established boundaries of Historic Filipinotown:

- Rosemont Elementary School, 421 Rosemont Avenue
- Alliance Ted K. Tajima High School, 1552 Rockwood Street

=== Samahang Pilipino Advancing Community Empowerment (SPACE) ===
Samahang Pilipino Advancing Community Empowerment (SPACE) is an access project created in 2000 by Samahang Pilipino at UCLA, the official student organization for the Pilipino and Pilipino American communities at UCLA. SPACE addresses and alleviate the barriers to higher education for at-risk, historically underrepresented, underserved high school and community college students in the Los Angeles area. Through peer tutoring, peer advising. student workshops, parent workshops, and field trips, SPACE promotes "academic success, personal well-being, community engagement, and the formulation of solid post-secondary plans".

In 2015, SPACE hosted Philippine Youth Empowerment Day, an event that featured workshops focused on Filipino-American history, identity and representation in the media.
