= Helen Agcaoili Summers Brown =

Filipina-American educator and librarian

- Born: May 16, 1915; Manila
- Died: January 25, 2011 (aged 95)
- Alma mater: Pasadena City College; University of California, Los Angeles
- Occupation: Librarian, teacher
- Employer: Los Angeles Unified School District

Helen Agcaoili Summers Brown (May 16, 1915 – January 25, 2011), often referred to as "Auntie Helen", was a Filipina-American educator and librarian. Brown established the first library in the United States to focus on the Philippines and the Filipino-American experience. She was an educator at the Los Angeles Unified School District for 34 years, where she worked to help Filipino-American children connect with their heritage and educate all students about Filipino culture.

== Early life and education ==
Helen Agcaoili Summers Brown was born in Manila on May 16, 1915. She was the third of seven children born to Trinidad Agcaoili Summers, a Filipina woman, and George R. Summers, an Anglo American man. Her father had emigrated to the Philippines to teach English as part of efforts to establish Western-style schools following the acquisition of the Philippines by the United States through the 1898 Treaty of Paris.

She graduated from Manila Central High School in 1934. Her family moved to Arcadia, California soon afterward, where Brown enrolled in Pasadena City College. After choosing to write a report on the Spanish influence on Manila, Helen found no resources in the college's library or the public library, and completed the assignment using her father's scrapbooks and memorabilia. The experience inspired her to become a lifelong collector of resources about Filipino culture.

Brown transferred to the University of California, Los Angeles (UCLA), where she earned her bachelor's degree in education (1937) and a master's degree in social work (1939). She is the first known Filipino to have graduated from UCLA. Brown was an early supporter of Asian American Studies at UCLA; she was a member of the interim steering committee that drafted the proposal to establish the Asian-American Studies Center in 1969.

She met William (Bill) Brown while attending UCLA. They dated for six months, and the couple got married in August 1941. They traveled to Boulder City, Colorado to get married due to California's miscegenation laws, then in place, which would not permit a mestiza to marry a white man. Due to a disability, Bill was not required to serve during World War II. Instead, Bill worked the midnight shift at Bethlehem Steel as a tester for welders. At the time, Brown was pregnant with her first son, and took a leave from teaching for six months. Many women worked as welders, and after encouragement from her husband, Brown became a welder, and welded the bulk heads of liberty ships.

The Browns enjoyed traveling, and would take their four sons on trips. Brown would periodically travel to the Philippines every two years after her marriage, bringing her children and husband, to visit her family and tour the country.

== Work as an Educator ==
Brown worked for the Los Angeles Unified School District (LAUSD) for thirty-four years, retiring in 1974. She first worked as a substitute teacher, before teaching fulltime. Brown taught third grade at schools within the district and other lower grades for eight years. While Brown enjoyed teaching, she felt confined by the school curriculum, and applied to become a Pupil Personnel and Attendance Counselor.

During her time at LAUSD, she lobbied the district to recognize the specific needs of Filipino-American school children. She also lobbied on behalf of Filipino-American schoolteachers, working to increase the number of teachers and to see them promoted within the system.

== Establishing the Filipino American Library ==
After retiring as a teacher, Brown focused her energy on the collection of materials she had gathered for four decades. The collection became a home library, and in 1985, a church near downtown Los Angeles, the First Filipino Christian Church, donated space in their basement for the library to reside. The Pilipino American Reading Room and Library (PARRAL) opened to the public on October 13, 1985. Brown hosted visiting hours two afternoons a week.

In 1988, the Pamana Foundation was established by Helen Brown, Tania Azores, Brad Bagasao, and Ming Menez to encourage interest in Filipino-American culture and history, with the library as a research center. PARRAL was moved to Luzon Plaza in Historic Filipinotown, Los Angeles in March 1994, providing more visibility. The Los Angeles Times described the opening as "a milestone in the history of the local Filipino community." Another relocation in 2000 moved the library to Temple Street and inspired a renaming of the library to the Filipino American Library (FAL). At 6,000 items, including books, pamphlets, photographs, and artifacts, it was the largest collection of Filipino and Filipino-American reading materials in the United States.

A short documentary titled Got Book? Auntie Helen's Gift of Books was created by Florante Ibanez in 2005 to recognize Brown and the founding of the FAL. In the film, Brown is interviewed by her son and discusses her upbringing in the Philippines as a mestiza.

When the Filipino American Library closed, the collections were sent to the University of Southern California Libraries. The USC Libraries have digitized materials in the Filipino American Library Collection, including materials written in English, Tagalog, and Ilocano.

== Later life and death ==
Brown and her family lived for over fifty years in Hermosa Beach, California. She spent her last years in an assisted living residence in Hermosa Beach. Brown died there on January 25, 2011.
