= The Park's Finest =

Coordinates: 34.066523°N 118.254199°W

- Interactive map of The Park's Finest

Restaurant information
- Established: 2012
- Owners: Johneric Concordia, Christine Araquel-Concordia
- Food type: Filipino American
- Location: Echo Park, Los Angeles, California, United States

The Park’s Finest is a Filipino American inspired Southern BBQ restaurant in Echo Park, Los Angeles which started as a small catering company in 2009. The owners of the restaurant, Johneric Concordia, Christine Araquel-Concordia, are Echo Park locals and long time friends who grew up in the neighborhood around Historic Filipinotown, Los Angeles. With assistance from an Asian Pacific Islander small business program and strong support from the surrounding community, The Park's Finest officially become a restaurant in 2012.

On July 8, 2013, Diners, Drive-Ins and Dives, a television show on the Food Network, aired an episode titled “L.A. Eats” featuring The Park’s Finest BBQ and the Eastside Market Italian Deli. Also guest starring in the episode were cast members of the movie Grown Ups 2 Adam Sandler, Chris Rock, Kevin James, and David Spade. As summarized on the Food Network’s website; “What started as a catering company soon became a hidden hot spot for Los Angelinos looking for tried-and-true Filipino comfort food. Guy loved the barbecue beef short ribs paired with a sharp crema horseradish sauce. And diners better watch out -- the addictive Bibingka cornbread is a real winner.”

The Park’s Finest has been featured on media outlets such as LA Weekly, NBC News, and The Wall Street Journal.

== Menu ==
The Park's Finest specializes in Filipino comfort food and encourages family style dining. Some of their most popular menu items include barbecue beef short ribs paired with sharp crema horseradish sauce, coconut beef, cornbread bibingka, and local craft beers. They are also known for their signature Backyard Boogie BBQ sauce.
