= Los Angeles School of Global Studies =

Location
- 322 South Lucas Ave; Los Angeles, California
- 34.058115°N 118.261453°W

Information
- Type: Public
- Established: 2006
- Principal: Christian Quintero
- Teaching staff: 18.67 (FTE)
- Enrollment: 310 (2023–2024)
- Student to teacher ratio: 16.60
- Campus: Urban
- Colors: Teal and Black
- Mascot: Cobra
- Website: www.lasgs.net

The Los Angeles School of Global Studies (LASGS) is a high school located within the Miguel Contreras Learning Complex. LASGS opened in the fall of 2006 with only Freshman and Sophomore classes as one of four New Technology High Schools in the Los Angeles area. In the 2008–2009 school-year they reached their target and current capacity of 360 students in their first year with all four grade levels.

New Tech Network schools promote the use of project-based learning and the team-teaching of courses. LASGS in particular has made a concerted effort to integrate those team-taught courses. Most notably all Humanities courses are taught in this model and although there are still come modifications being made to the Math and Science pairings, they are also team-taught and integrated at a far higher level than most other schools in the network. The GeoDesign course that is currently taught by Dina Mahmood, Geometry teacher, and David Brown, Design Media instructor, is another integrated, co-taught course offered to all students at LA Global Studies.

== History ==
Los Angeles School of Global Studies was established on September 5, 2006.

In 2012, Christian Quintero, a teacher at the school took over as Principal of LASGS.

The Globe, LASGS's student newspaper, existed since 2005.

A program called Youth Voices is a school-based social network that was started in 2003.

In 2011 a couple of UCLA professors and students designed an 18 ft by 334 ft digital mural.

== Project-based learning ==
Los Angeles School of Global Studies is a project-based learning school. LASGS students work in many kinds of projects. The students work together and collaborate in many different projects that require communication and critical thinking in order to answer a driving question or a challenging question. They always work in groups and the period of time is for a month or more. The students at LASGS use websites such as Echo, a website that supports project-based learning schools.

== Awards ==
On July 20, 2012, LASGS won the Chan P. Wick Award for Social Justice at the New Tech Network Annual Conference. This award is given to a school that demonstrates success in closing the achievement gap for underserved students, exemplifies the New Tech model and graduates students college and career ready.
