= Filipino Christian Church =

Los Angeles Historic-Cultural Monuments

- U.S. National Register of Historic Places
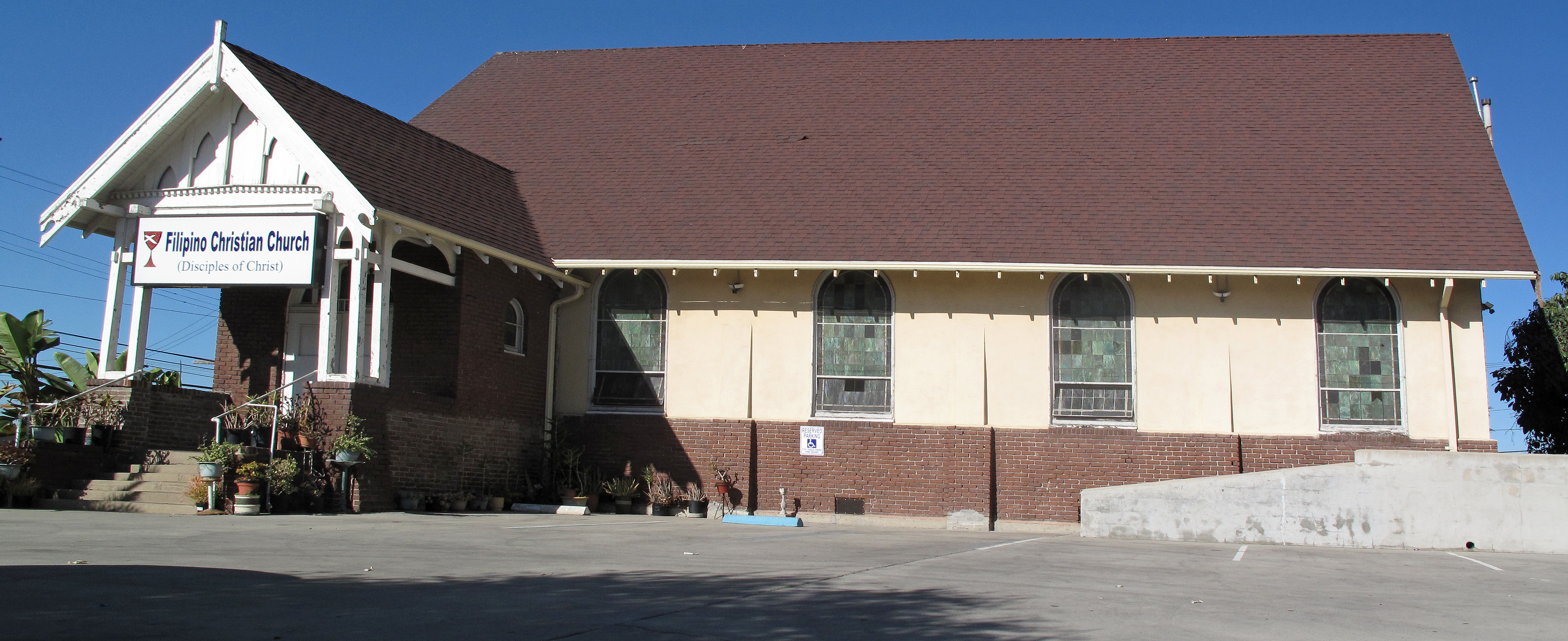
- Interactive map of Filipino Christian Church
- Location: Westlake, Los Angeles, California, U.S.
- Coordinates: 34.0677°N 118.2644°W
- Built: 1915
- Architectural style: Craftsman
- NRHP reference No.: 100003291
- Added to NRHP: January 4, 2019

The Filipino Christian Church is an historic Christian Church (Disciples of Christ) church located at 301 N. Union Avenue in the Westlake neighborhood of Los Angeles, California. Built in 1915, the Craftsman-style building features stained-glass windows. The church was designated Los Angeles Historic-Cultural Monument No. 651 in 1998, and added to the National Register of Historic Places on January 4, 2019.
