= Hollywood Theater (Los Angeles) =

Former movie theater in Los Angeles, California

- U.S. Historic district – Contributing property
- Hollywood Theater in 2013

- Location within the Los Angeles metropolitan area
- Location: 6764 Hollywood Blvd., Hollywood, California
- Coordinates: 34°06′06″N 118°20′17″W
- Built: 1913
- Architects: Krempel and Erkes; Clifford Balch; S. Charles Lee
- Part of: Hollywood Boulevard Commercial and Entertainment District (ID85000704)
- Designated CP: April 4, 1985

Hollywood Theater is a historic former movie theater located at 6764 Hollywood Boulevard in Hollywood, Los Angeles, California.

== History ==
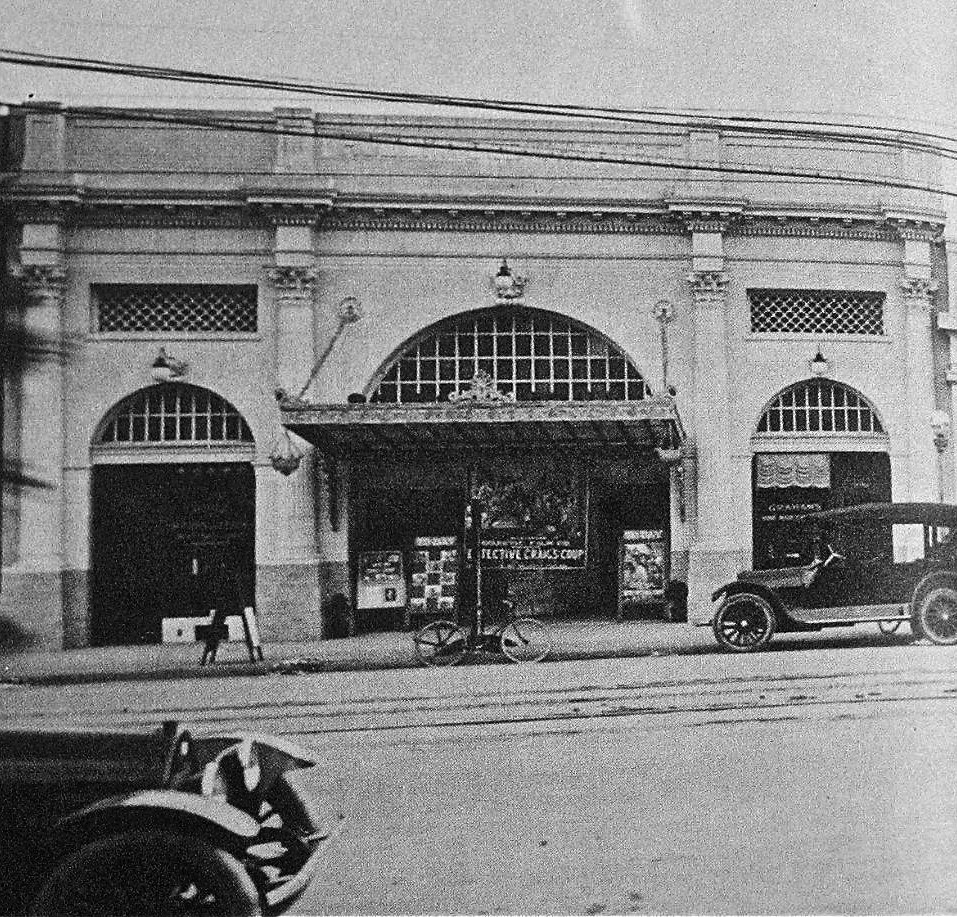
The theatre in 1914

Hollywood Theater opened on December 20, 1913, the second theater to open in Hollywood's emerging theater district. A 700-seat Nickelodeon, it was owned by H.L. Lewis and designed in the Romanesque style by Krempel and Erkes. Its initial admission price was $0.10 ($3.26 in 2025).

The theater was remodeled by Clifford Balch in 1927, damaged by arson in 1933, and remodeled a second time in 1936, this time by S. Charles Lee. In the second remodel, the building's original white brick façade was replaced with an art deco version, and a neon marquee was added, the marquee angled to catch the eye of passing motorists. By 1938, the theater was operated by Fox West Coast Theatres as a second run move-over house for the Chinese Theatre. The theater was remodeled a final time in 1977.

In 1985, the Hollywood Boulevard Commercial and Entertainment District was added to the National Register of Historic Places, with Hollywood Theater listed as a contributing property in the district. Specifically noted were the theater's neon signage, stucco facade, terrazzo and brick materials, and that the theater is the oldest in Hollywood.

The theater was shut down by Mann Theatres in 1992, and two years later the Guinness World of Records Museum moved into the building.

In 2024, Hollywood Theatre was one of four Hollywood and Highland buildings proposed for demolition to make way for a metro entrance on the K Line Northern Extension. The other buildings are 6806 Hollywood Boulevard, Bank of America Building, and Lee Drug.

== Architecture and design ==
Hollywood Theater originally featured a Romanesque design. The building had a white glazed brick facade, the lobby featured marble tile, and the auditorium featured Corinthian columns and a coffered ceiling.

In 1936, the white glazed brick facade was replaced by an Art Deco facade. Exterior signage was also added to the building that year, most notably a neon sign that was one of the first in the world to include angled side panels to be read by passing motorists.

== See also ==
- List of contributing properties in the Hollywood Boulevard Commercial and Entertainment District
