= 6806 Hollywood Boulevard =

Building in Los Angeles, California

- U.S. Historic district – Contributing property
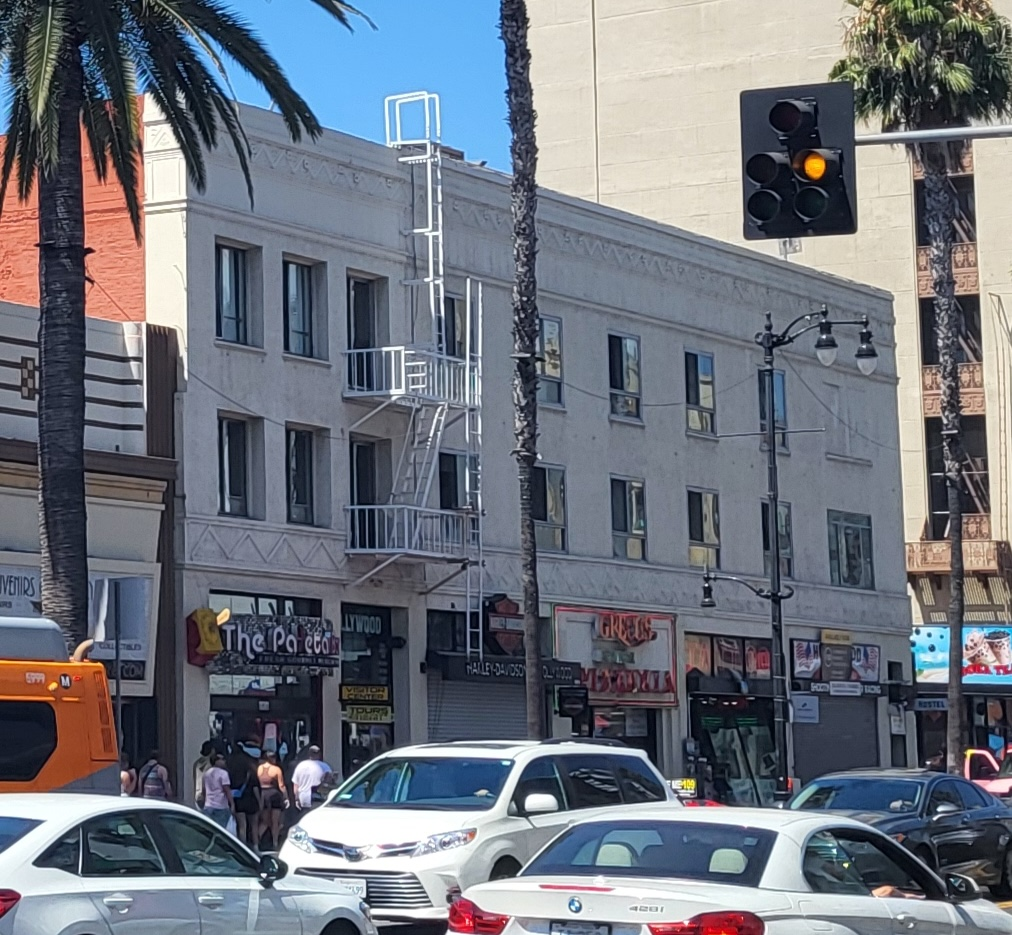
- The building in 2024

- Location within the Los Angeles metropolitan area
- Location: 6806 W. Hollywood Blvd., Hollywood, California
- Coordinates: 34.102°N 118.339°W
- Built: 1922
- Architectural style: Art Deco
- Part of: Hollywood Boulevard Commercial and Entertainment District (ID85000704)
- Designated CP: April 4, 1985

6806 Hollywood Boulevard is a historic Art Deco structure at 6806 West Hollywood Boulevard in Hollywood, Los Angeles, California.

== History ==
6806 Hollywood Boulevard was built in 1922 as a multi-story stucco commercial building, with some art deco ornament in its design. The building had two stories in 1926 and four by 1944, one of which was a mezzanine. It originally housed the Bonnie Brier hotel.

In 1985, the Hollywood Boulevard Commercial and Entertainment District was added to the National Register of Historic Places, with 6806 Hollywood Boulevard listed as a contributing property in the district. The listing describes the building as having three stories.

In 1983, Mazen Nazzal and a partner invested in the building, and Nazzal bought out his partner in 2013. At this point, the building housed ground floor retail and a hostel run by Nazzal's sons in the two floors above.

In 2024, 6806 Hollywood Boulevard was one of four Hollywood and Highland buildings proposed for demolition to make way for a metro entrance on the K Line Northern Extension. The other buildings were Bank of America Building, Hollywood Theater, and Lee Drug.

== See also ==
- List of contributing properties in the Hollywood Boulevard Commercial and Entertainment District
