= Bonnie Brae Street =

Bonnie Brae Street in the Westlake and Pico-Union districts of Central Los Angeles, is connected with two topics:

- South Bonnie Brae Tract Historic District
- Azusa Street Revival
