= Glendale Narrows =

Section of the Los Angeles River

Coordinates: 34.116°N 118.268°W

Glendale Narrows of the Los Angeles River.
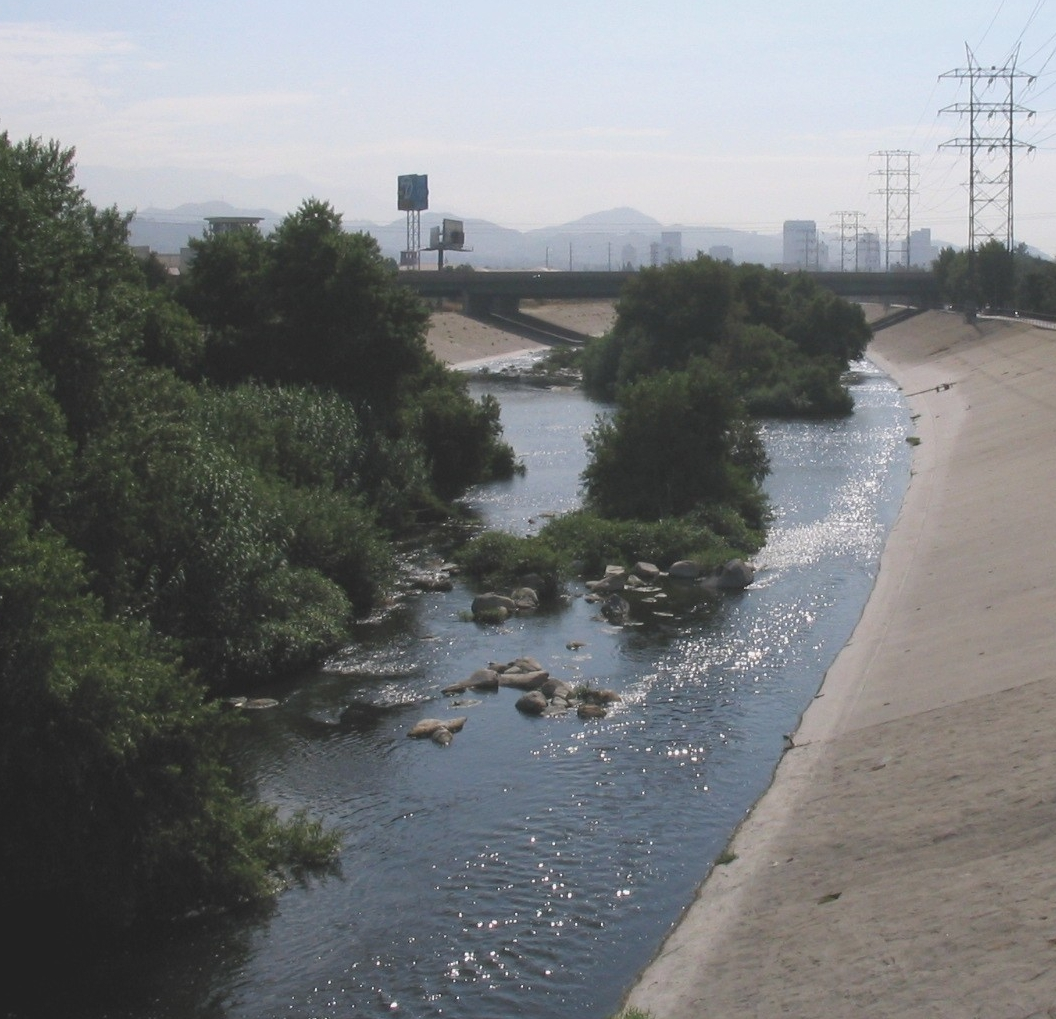

The Glendale Narrows is a scenic 11 mile (17.7 km) section of the Los Angeles River in the Northeast Los Angeles region of Los Angeles County, California.

== History ==
The Tongva people used the Los Angeles River as a vital resource, and had village sites in the larger Glendale Narrows region. These villages included Yaanga and Geveronga.

== Geography ==
The Glendale Narrows forms a mountain pass separating the Santa Monica Mountains to the west from the Repetto Hills to the east.

The section's course is adjacent to Glendale, Griffith Park, Los Feliz, Atwater Village, and Elysian Valley. It is one of four sections of the Los Angeles River that has an earthen bottom. The area is popular for outdoor recreation, birdwatching, and local fishing.

Major streets crossing it include: Los Feliz Boulevard, Glendale Boulevard, and Fletcher Drive. There is also a footbridge between Sunnynook River Park and Atwater Village, south of Los Feliz Blvd.

Starting points for access include: The Elysian Valley Bicycle & Pedestrian Path, Glendale Narrows River Walk, North Atwater Creek Restoration & Park, and Marsh Park.

== Bike path ==
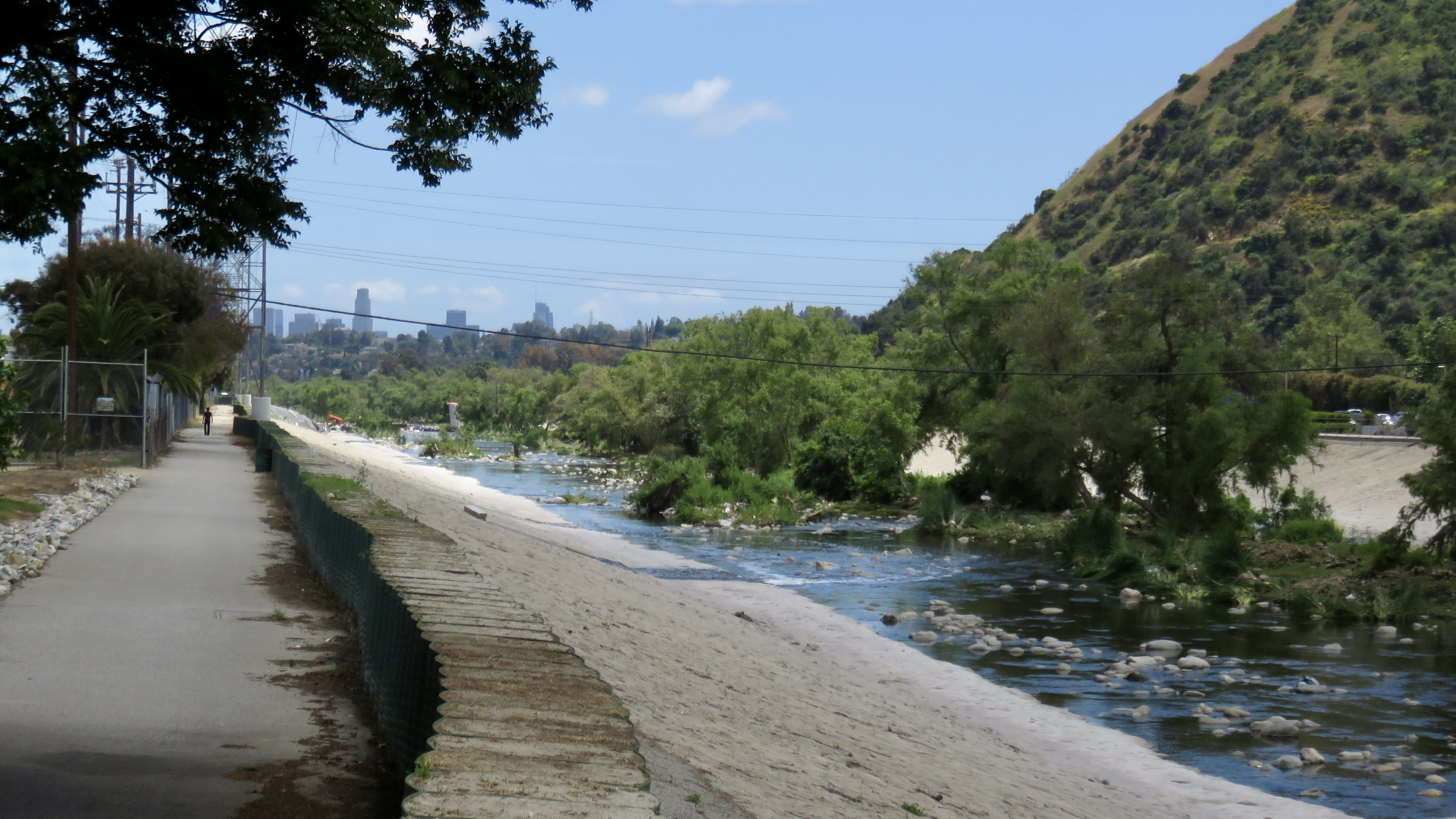
The section of Glendale Narrows in Atwater Village, Los Angeles, looking towards Downtown Los Angeles

The Glendale Narrows Elysian Valley Bike Path and pedestrian walkway, a 7.4 miles (11.9 km) section of the Los Angeles River bicycle path and pedestrian walkway, runs along the Glendale Narrows through Glendale, Griffith Park, Atwater Village, and Elysian Valley. Access to its end points are located at Riverside Drive & Victory Boulevard in Burbank and Egret Park in Elysian Valley. There are other access points along its route.

Parks along the path include: Rio de Los Angeles State Park, northeastern Griffith Park, Egret Park, Oso Park, Steelhead Park, Duck Park, Riverdale Mini-Park, Marsh Park, Rattlesnake Park, Crystal Park, and Sunnynook River Park.

The 3.2 miles (5.1 km) segment from Riverside Drive, opposite Burbank, to Los Feliz Blvd, opened July 1997 and was the first lighted bike path in Los Angeles.

"As you ride, you can take the scenery which includes views of the San Gabriel Mountains. You'll undoubtedly spot wildlife and birds like ducks, geese, hawks, and herons. You'll probably also see kayakers floating along and people fishing from the banks."

== Ecology ==
=== Flora ===
Riparian zone flora is allowed establish in the only non-concrete bottom section of the channelized Los Angeles River. Native plants include: Arroyo Willows (Salix lasiolepsis), Cattails (Typha dominguinsis), Swamp sedge (Carex senta), Soft rush (Juncus effusus), Toad rush (Juncus bufonius), California endemic Wrinkled rush (Juncus rugulosus), and Watercress (Rorippa nasturtium-aquaticum).

=== Fauna ===
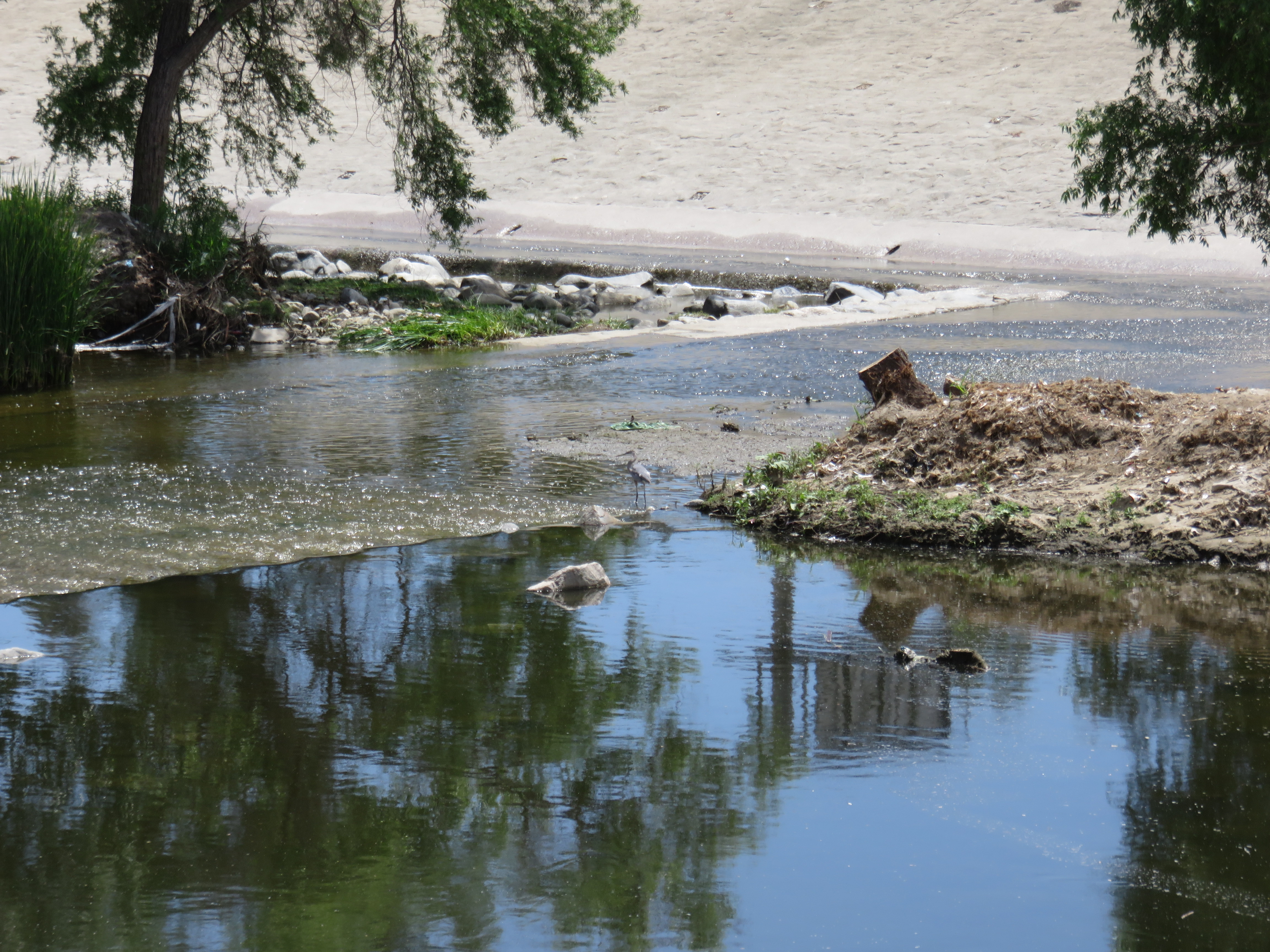
A bird in the river

The Glendale Narrows area supports a range of bird species, including the great egret, snowy egret, great blue heron, green heron, black-crowned night heron, double-crested cormorant, American white pelican, mallard, cinnamon teal, northern shoveler, American coot, black-necked stilt, greater yellowlegs, spotted sandpiper, killdeer, black phoebe, red-winged blackbird, and the introduced Muscovy duck. It also serves as a stopover for migrating birds such as the Canada goose. Bird hunting is illegal, violators are subject to a minimum $550 fine.

The Narrows also serve as a water source for many other animals which include mule deer, domesticated horse, king snake, and beaver. Before development in the 20th century, animals such as mountain lion, Mexican gray wolf, and the extinct California grizzly bear also relied on the river.

Before complete concrete channelization of the LA River above and below the Glendale Narrows, it was home to native populations of steelhead trout. Among the fish and crustaceans found in the area are introduced species such as common carp, largemouth bass, tilapia, green sunfish, black bullhead, catfish, fathead minnow, mosquito fish, and crawfish. Currently, fishing is legal throughout the year.

== See also ==
- Los Angeles River topics
- Rivers of Los Angeles County, California
