= Lee Drug =

Building in Los Angeles, California, U.S.

- U.S. Historic district – Contributing property
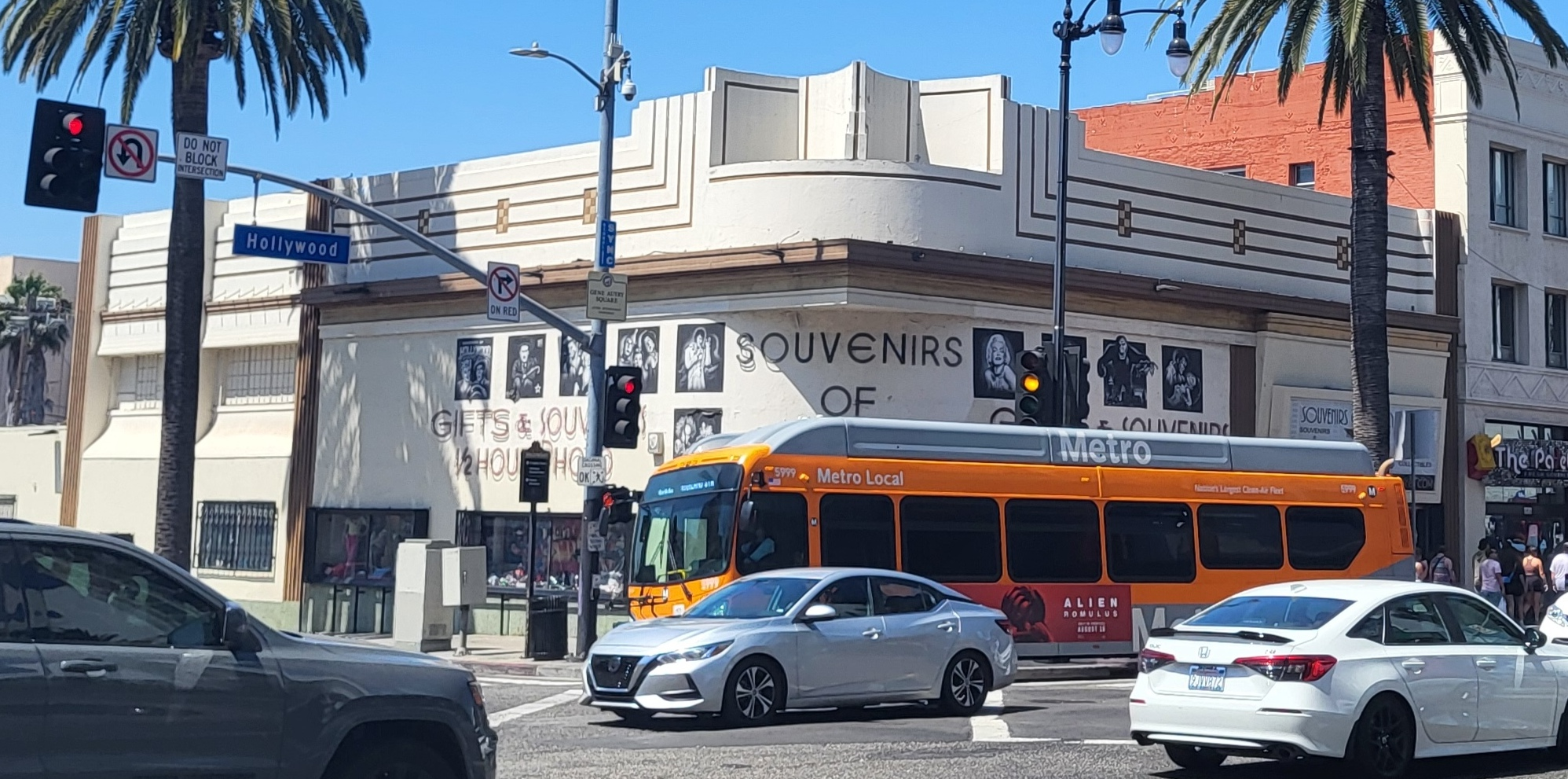
- The building in 2024

- Location within the Los Angeles metropolitan area
- Location: 6800 W. Hollywood Blvd. and 1669 N. Highland Ave., Hollywood, California
- Coordinates: 34.1014°N 118.3389°W
- Built: 1935
- Architect: B. D. Bixby
- Architectural style: Art Deco, Streamline Moderne
- Part of: Hollywood Boulevard Commercial and Entertainment District (ID85000704)
- Designated CP: April 4, 1985

Lee Drug is a historic commercial building located at 6800 W. Hollywood Boulevard and 1669 N. Highland Avenue in Hollywood, California.

== Architecture ==
Lee Drug synthesizes Art Deco and Streamline Moderne styles, and features horizontal banding, deco detailing, and a pronounced vertical sign projected above the roof.

== History ==
Lee Drug was built by B. D. Bixby in 1935, and during its heyday, it housed a drugstore that, due to its proximity to major Hollywood studios, sold a large selection of TV and screen make-up to actors.

In 1985, when the Hollywood Boulevard Commercial and Entertainment District was added to the National Register of Historic Places, Lee Drug was listed as a contributing property in the district.

A mural was added to the back of the building in 2021, and in 2024, the building was one of four Hollywood and Highland buildings proposed for demolition to make way for a metro entrance on the K Line Northern Extension. The other buildings were 6806 Hollywood Boulevard, Bank of America Building, and Hollywood Theater.

== See also ==
- List of contributing properties in the Hollywood Boulevard Commercial and Entertainment District
