= John Paul Krempel =

American architect

- Born: October 19, 1861; Germany
- Died: September 14, 1933 (aged 71); Los Angeles, California, U.S.
- Resting place: Inglewood Park Cemetery
- Occupation: Architect
- Spouse: Emelie Kuhrts
- Children: 2 sons, 1 daughter
- Relatives: Jacob Kuhrts (father-in-law)

John Paul Krempel (October 19, 1861 – September 14, 1933) was a German-born American architect who designed numerous buildings in Los Angeles, California.

== Early life and education ==
John Paul Krempel was born on October 19, 1861, in Bad Kreuznach, Germany. He had one brother and three sisters.

Krempel trained in Berlin as either an engineer or an architect. He emigrated to the United States in 1887 and was naturalized in 1894.

== Career ==
Krempel worked as a draftsman from 1888 to at least 1890 and began working as a principal architect in 1894. In 1896, he partnered with Frank Joseph Capitain and from 1911 to 1933, he partnered with Walter Erkes.

In 1909, Krempel was appointed to the California State Board of Architectural Examiners. He also acted as President of the board's southern district from at least 1913 to 1917, and remained a member until 1933. Other board members at the time included Frederick Roehrig, Octavius Morgan, Sumner Hunt, and William S. Hebbard.

=== List of works ===
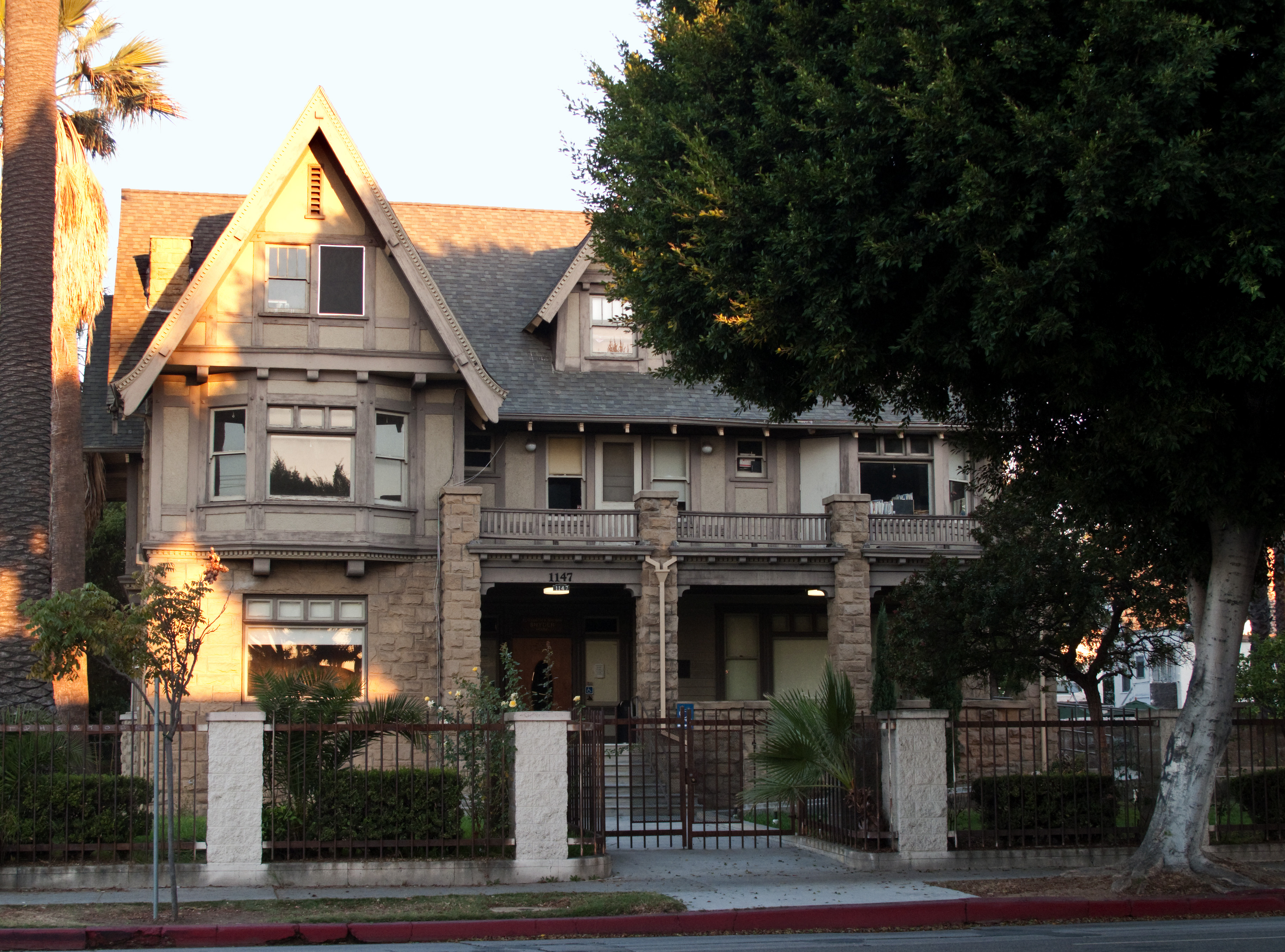
August Winstell House

Krempel's notable works include (in Los Angeles unless otherwise noted):

- Los Angeles Times Building No. 2 (1887), destroyed by bombing in 1910
- The Bivouac (also known as Harrison Gray Otis House) (1898), demolished in 1954
- August Winstell House (1907), LAHCM No. 328
- G. Wrenner House (1908)
- August Rothenpiller House (1908)

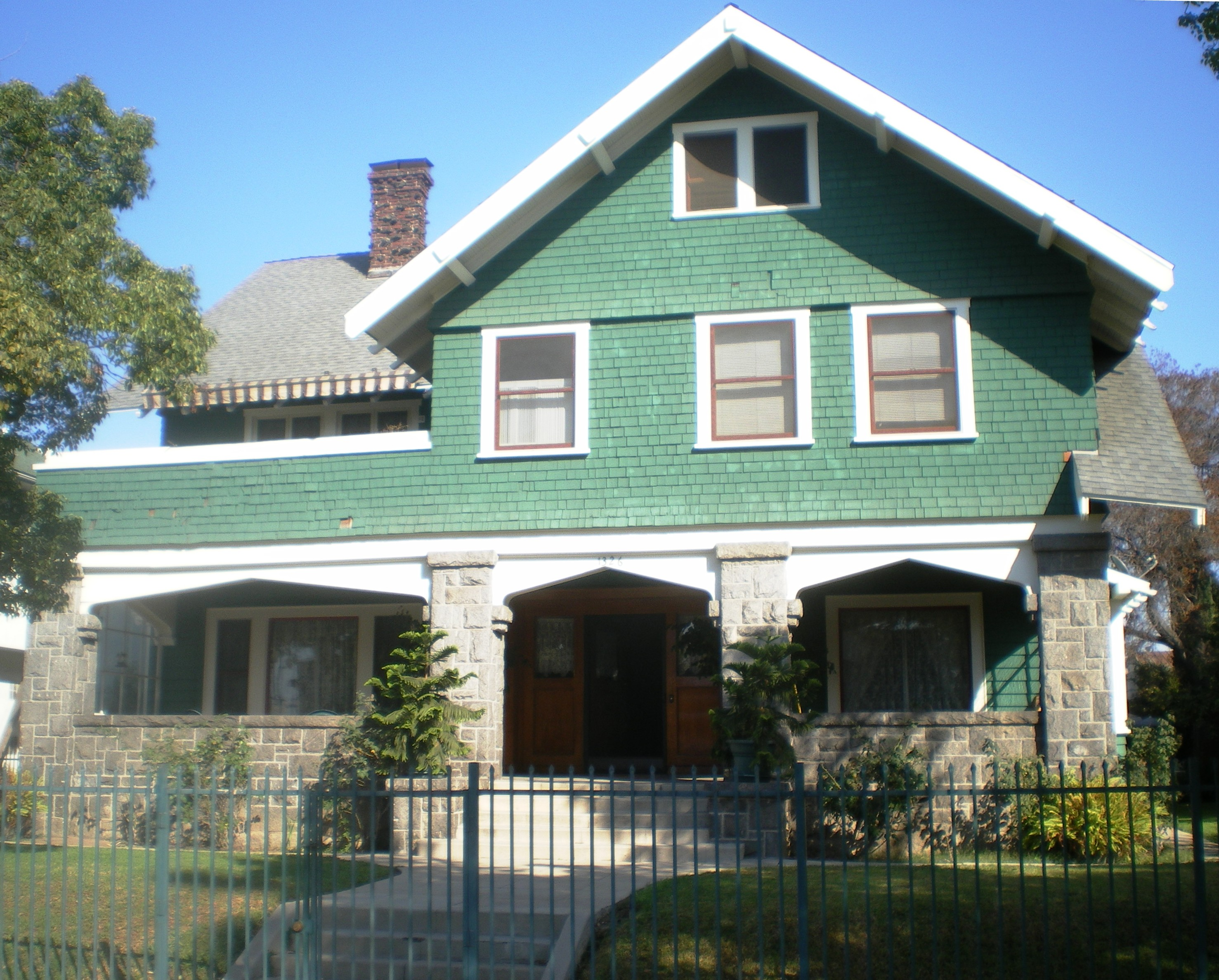
Eyraud Residence

- Eyraud Residence, LAHCM No. 626
- Engine Co. No. 28 firehouse

==== With Erkes ====
- Agricultural Chemical Works Warehouse (1908)
- Hollywood Theater (1913), NRHP-listed
- American Beet Sugar Company Adobe Housing (1918), Oxnard
- Mechicano Art Center (1922), LAHCM No. 1234
- Old Town Music Hall (1922), El Segundo
- Turnverein Germania Club (1925–1926), demolished in 1976
- Bank of Italy National Trust and Savings Association Building (1928), Alhambra
- Rowan-Bradley Building (1930), Long Beach
- Eastside Brewing Company Building, LAHCM No. 388
- German Hospital in Boyle Heights

== Personal life ==
Krempel married Emelie Kuhrts, the daughter of Jacob Kuhrts, in 1896. They had three children together and Emelie died sometime before 1922.

Krempel was a Scottish Rite Mason and was a member of the Los Angeles Commandery of the Knights Templar, Al Malaikah Temple of the Shrine, and Elks' Lodge No. 99. He died on September 14, 1933, at Lincoln Hospital, and was buried at Inglewood Park Cemetery.
