= Walter E. Erkes =

American architect

- Born: March 25, 1884
- Died: June 23, 1961 (aged 77); Los Angeles County, California, U.S.
- Occupation: Architect

Walter E. Erkes (March 25, 1884 – June 23, 1961) was an American architect who designed buildings in southern California.

== Biography ==
Walter E. Erkes was born on March 25, 1884. He partnered with John Paul Krempel from 1911 to 1933 and he died in Los Angeles County on June 23, 1961.

== List of works ==
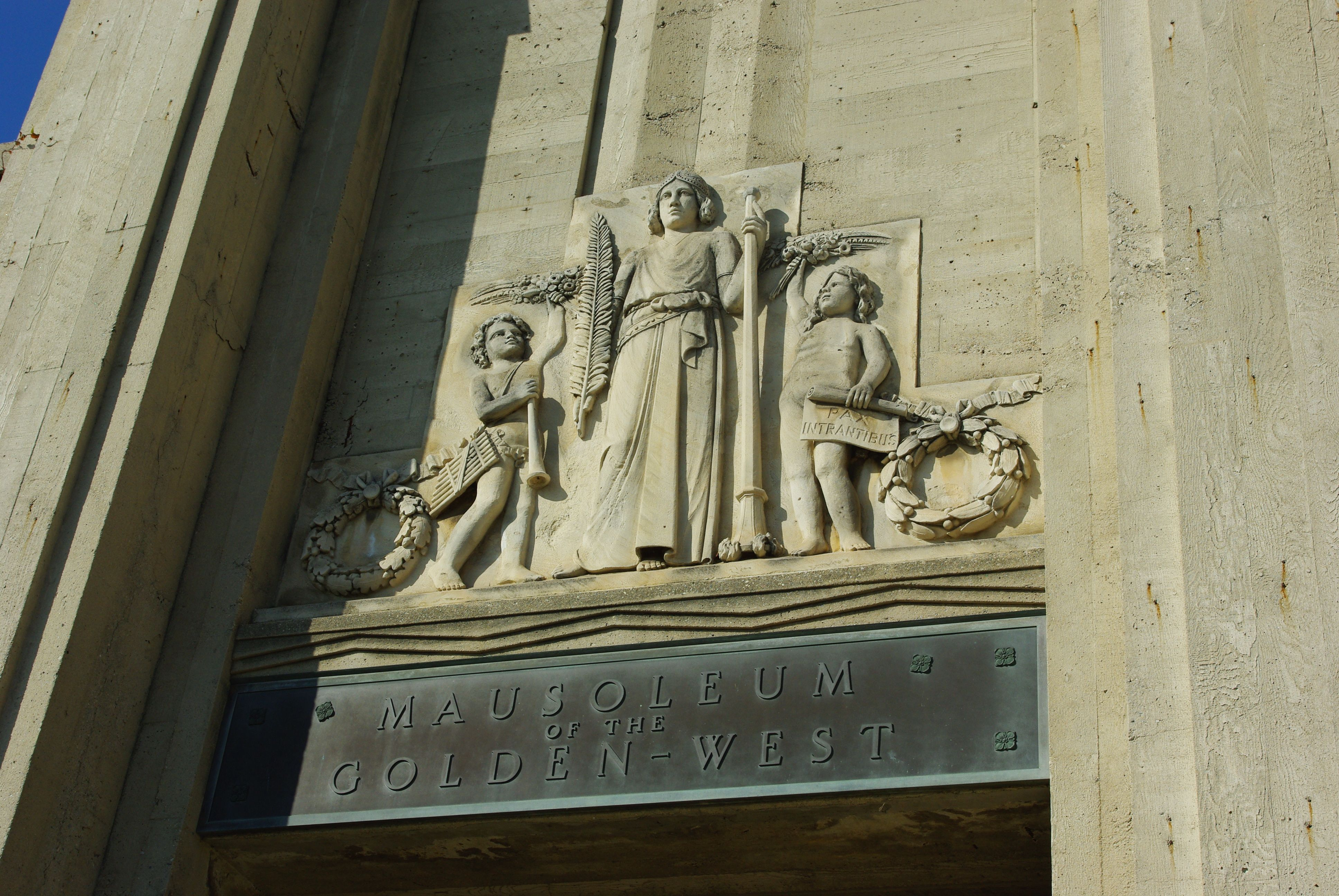
Inglewood Mausoleum at Inglewood Park Cemetery

Erkes notable works include (in Los Angeles unless otherwise noted):

- Inglewood Mausoleum, Inglewood

=== With Krempel ===
- Agricultural Chemical Works Warehouse (1908)
- Hollywood Theater (1913), NRHP-listed
- American Beet Sugar Company Adobe Housing (1918), Oxnard
- Mechicano Art Center (1922), LAHCM No. 1234
- Turnverein Germania Club (1925–1926), demolished in 1976
- Bank of Italy National Trust and Savings Association Building (1928), Alhambra
- Rowan-Bradley Building (1930), Long Beach
- Eastside Brewing Company Building, LAHCM No. 388
- German Hospital in Boyle Heights
