= Frederick Mitchell Mooers House =

Historic house in California, United States

- U.S. National Register of Historic Places
- Los Angeles Historic-Cultural Monument
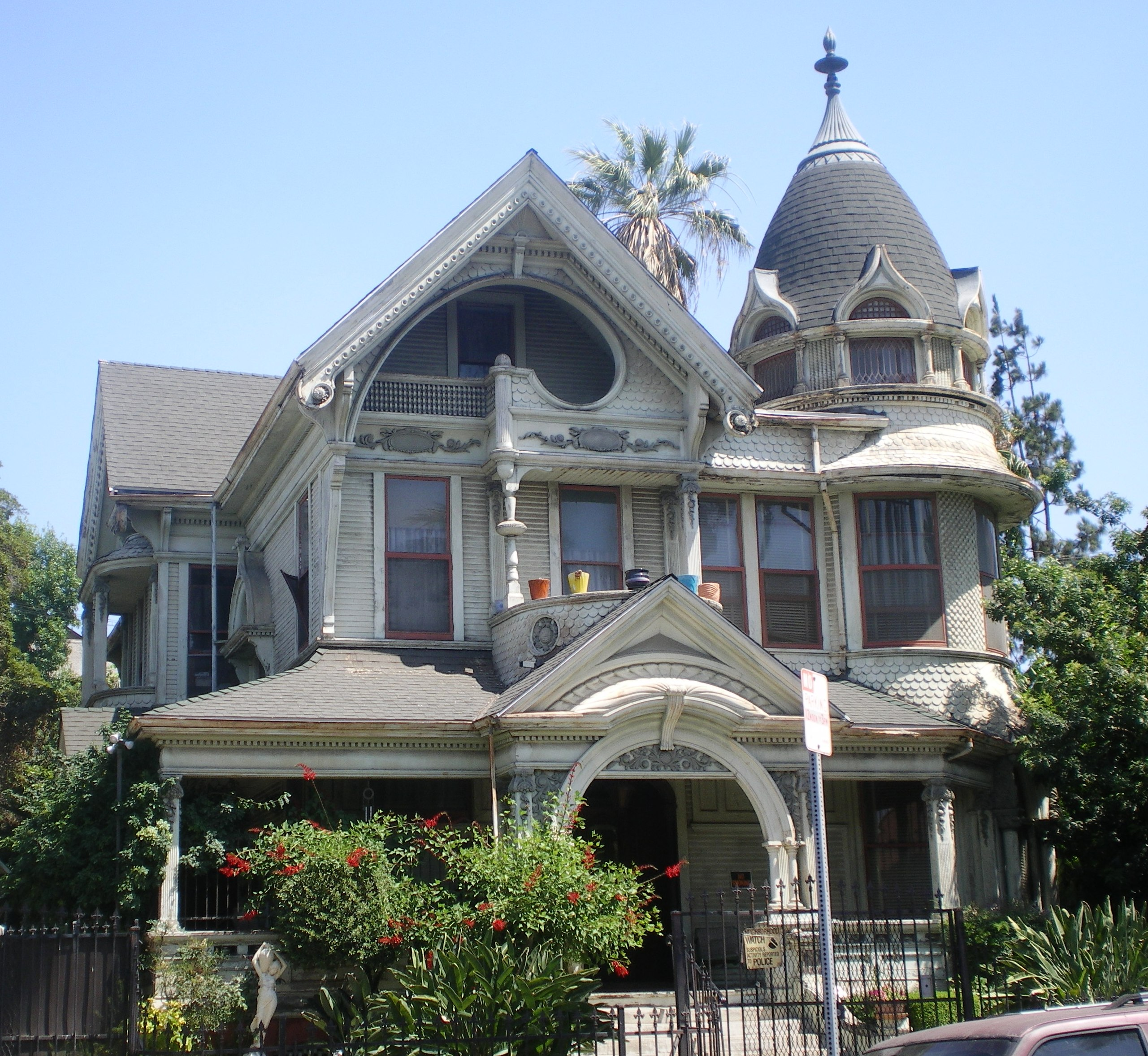
- Mooers House, 2008

- Location within the Los Angeles metropolitan area Location within California Location within the United States
- Location: 818 S. Bonnie Brae St., Los Angeles, California
- Coordinates: 34°3′11.5″N 118°16′32.5″W
- Built: 1894
- Architect: Bradbeer & Ferris architecture firm
- Architectural style: Queen Anne-Richardsonian Romanesque-Moorish Revival-Victorian
- NRHP reference No.: 76000489
- LAHCM No.: 45

Significant dates
- Added to NRHP: June 3, 1976
- Designated LAHCM: February 8, 1967

The Frederick Mitchell Mooers House, also known as the Wright-Mooers House, is an ornately detailed Victorian house built in 1894 at 818 South Bonnie Brae Street in the Westlake area of Los Angeles, California. It is named after the wealthy gold miner who owned the house from 1898 to 1900.

The house has been designated as a Los Angeles Historic-Cultural Monument and is listed in the National Register of Historic Places.

== Architecture ==
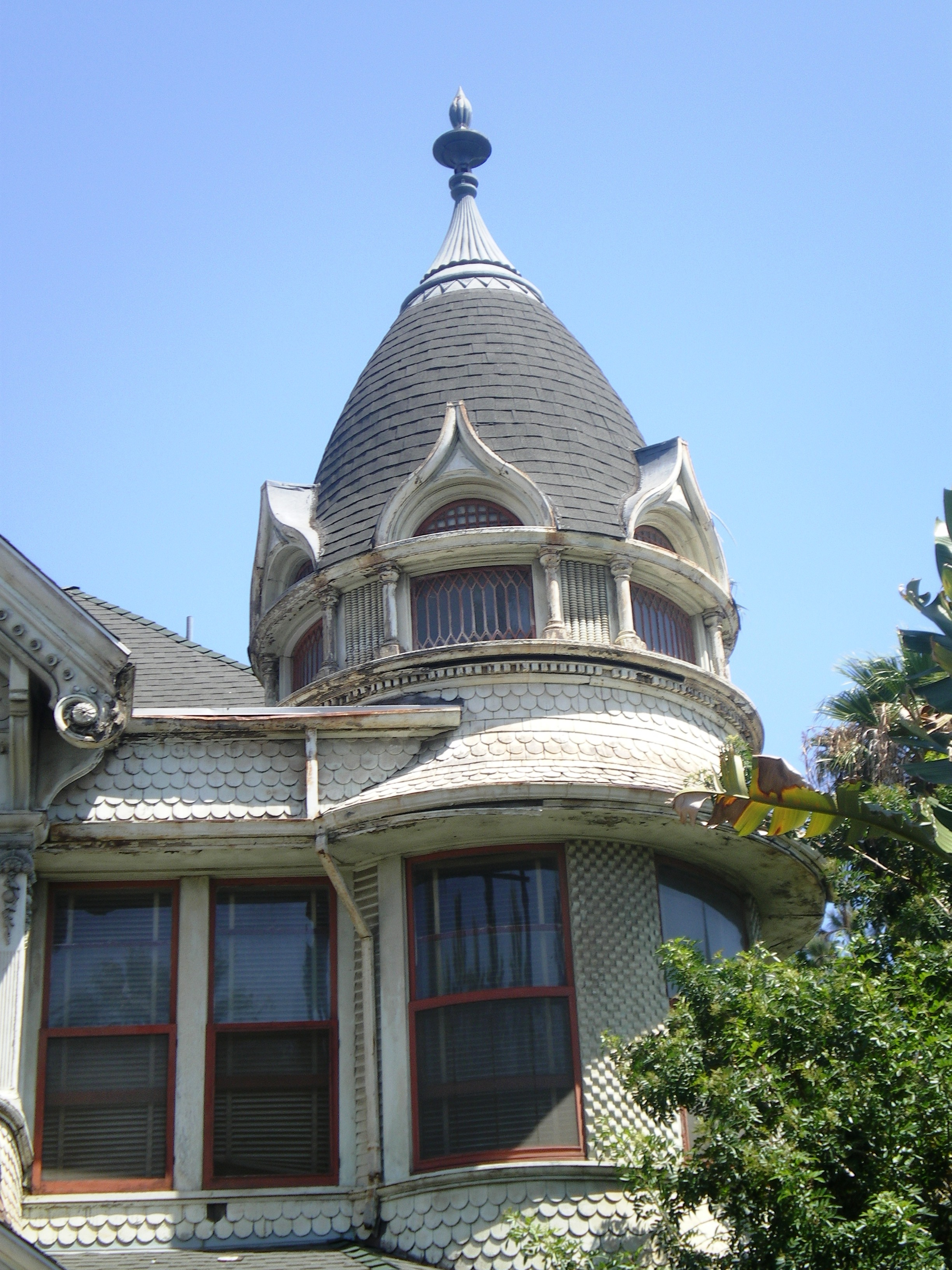
Dome on Mooers House

The Victorian era house combines elements of Queen Anne, Richardsonian Romanesque and Moorish Revival architectural styles.

In their book, "An Architectural Guidebook to Los Angeles," authors David Gebhard and Robert Winter note that the home's overall design is in the Queen Anne style, though are also elements of Richardsonian Romanesque (the two pairs of small columns) and Islamic design (the elongated domed roof) (Moorish Revival).

== Ownership of the House ==
=== The Wrights and Mooers ===
The Mooers House was built in 1894 for May Gertrude Wright and F. L. Wright. However, the Wrights sold the house in 1898 to Frederick M. Mooers (1847–1900) for $5,200. Mooers, known as the "Yellow Aster mining king," was the home's most famous occupant, and the house is commonly known by his name despite his having lived there for less than two years. Mooers came from a wealthy family, but reportedly had an adventurous spirit and spent years prospecting for gold in Montana, Wyoming, Colorado, Mexico, New Mexico and Arizona. He moved to Southern California in 1885 and spent years traveling through the Mojave Desert on a burro with a pickaxe and grub-kit searching for his big strike. In 1895, while working with two other prospectors who became his partners, Mooers picked a spot in Randsburg, California that proved to be the site of the Yellow Aster mine, the richest in the area. Mooers became a wealthy man and bought a house in one of the finest neighborhoods in Los Angeles.

==== Will contest over Frederick Mooers' estate ====
The Mooers House and the Mooers entire estate became the subject of a bitter and widely publicized will contest after he died at age 52 in 1900. At the time of his death, Mooers' interest in the Yellow Aster Mining and Milling Company was valued at $755,050; the family house on Bonnie Brae was valued at $10,000. Mooers' wife, who was given only one-sixth of the estate, had not lived with him for 18 years prior to discovery of the Yellow Aster mine. Mrs. Mooers said she had tried living with him over the years, but his alcoholism had caused him to desert his family, leaving her to run a boarding house in New York. On making the big strike in 1895, Mooers wrote asking her to join him in California. Mrs. Mooers came to California and had Mooers deed his interest in the Yellow Aster to her. Mrs. Mooers than granted an option in the property to another, spawning litigation over the mine's ownership. Though Mrs. Mooers had filed for divorce (on grounds of desertion) in 1898, the two remained married, and upon Mooers' death it was revealed that he had recently signed a new will – limiting Mrs. Mooers to one-sixth of the estate and leaving the house on Bonnie Brae to his mother. Prior to his death, Mooers was living at the house on Bonnie Brae with his brothers, and Mrs. Mooers alleged that Mr. Mooers was suffering from severe alcoholism prior to his death and had been coerced by one of his brothers to sign the new will. Mrs. Mooers noted that her husband had been hospitalized for delirium tremens and was not in a proper mental state to sign a new will. The Los Angeles Times reported that Mooers was "shattered by drink" and had come under the delusion that his wife was trying to kill him. Mooers' brother, who along with two other brothers and their mother were the principal beneficiaries of Mooers' will, contended that Mrs. Moers had not been "a good and faithful wife" and should receive nothing from the estate. The dispute was settled the day before it was to be tried, after Mrs. Mooers met with her late husband's brother at the family home on Bonnie Brae.

==== Ownership by Mooers' mother and brothers ====
The Mooers House on Bonnie Brae ultimately was conveyed to Mooers' mother, Eliza A.R. Mooers, who lived there until her death in January 1902. The house was then inherited by her surviving sons.

== Historic designations ==
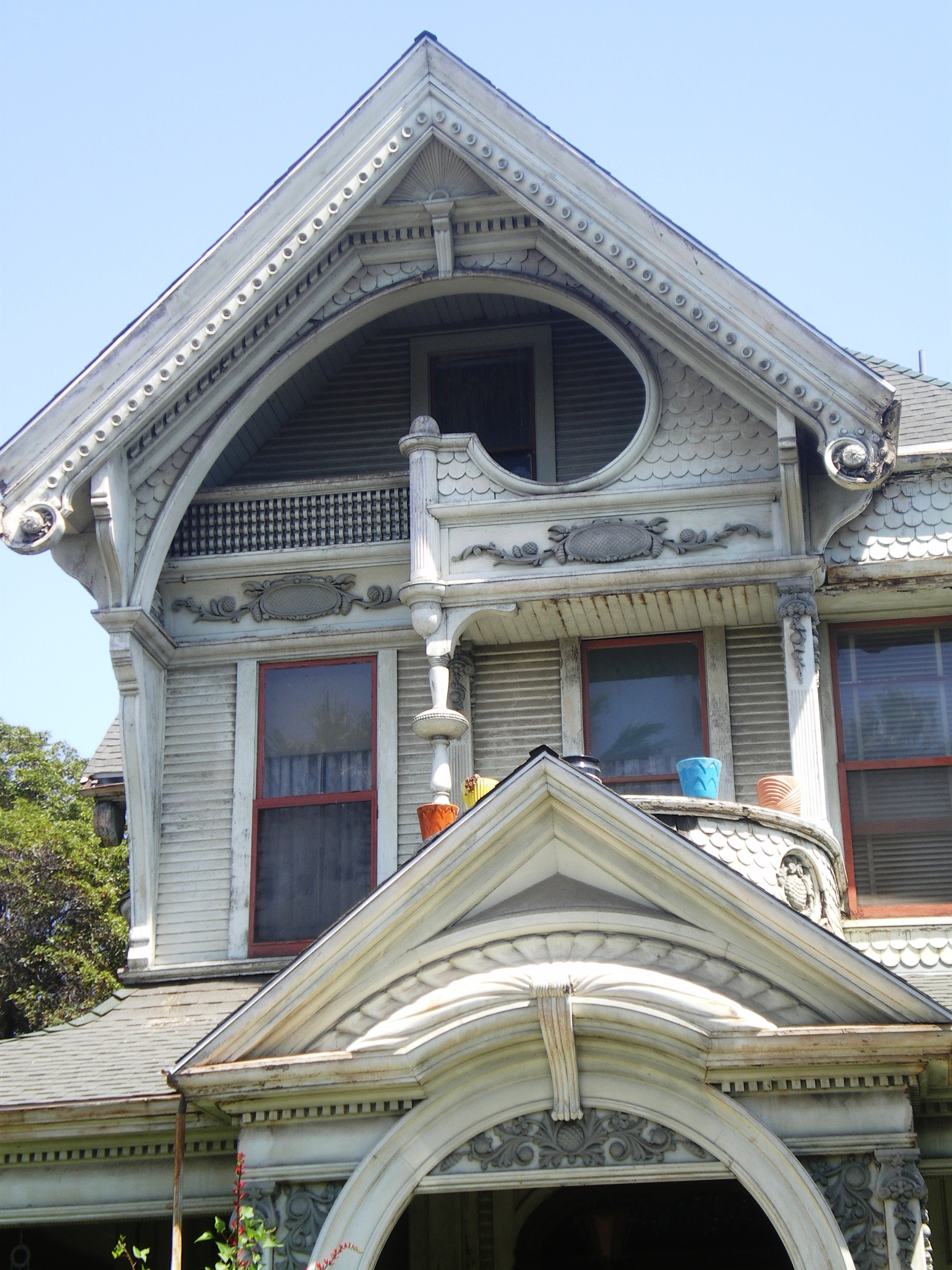
Closeup of top of the house

Though the surrounding neighborhood is no longer an upper-class neighborhood as it was at the turn of the 20th century, the Mooers House and other Victorians in the South Bonnie Brae Historic District have been well preserved. The Mooers House has often been used as an illustration of West Coast Victorian architecture.

The Mooers House was declared a Historic-Cultural Monument (HCM #45) in 1967 by the Los Angeles Cultural Heritage Commission. It was also listed in the National Register of Historic Places in 1976. The historic marker at the house calls the home "A Prototype of Distinctive Architecture of the Boom of the 80’s".

== See also ==
- List of Registered Historic Places in Los Angeles
- List of Los Angeles Historic-Cultural Monuments in the Wilshire and Westlake areas
