= Bank of America Building (Hollywood) =

Building in Los Angeles, California

- U.S. Historic district – Contributing property
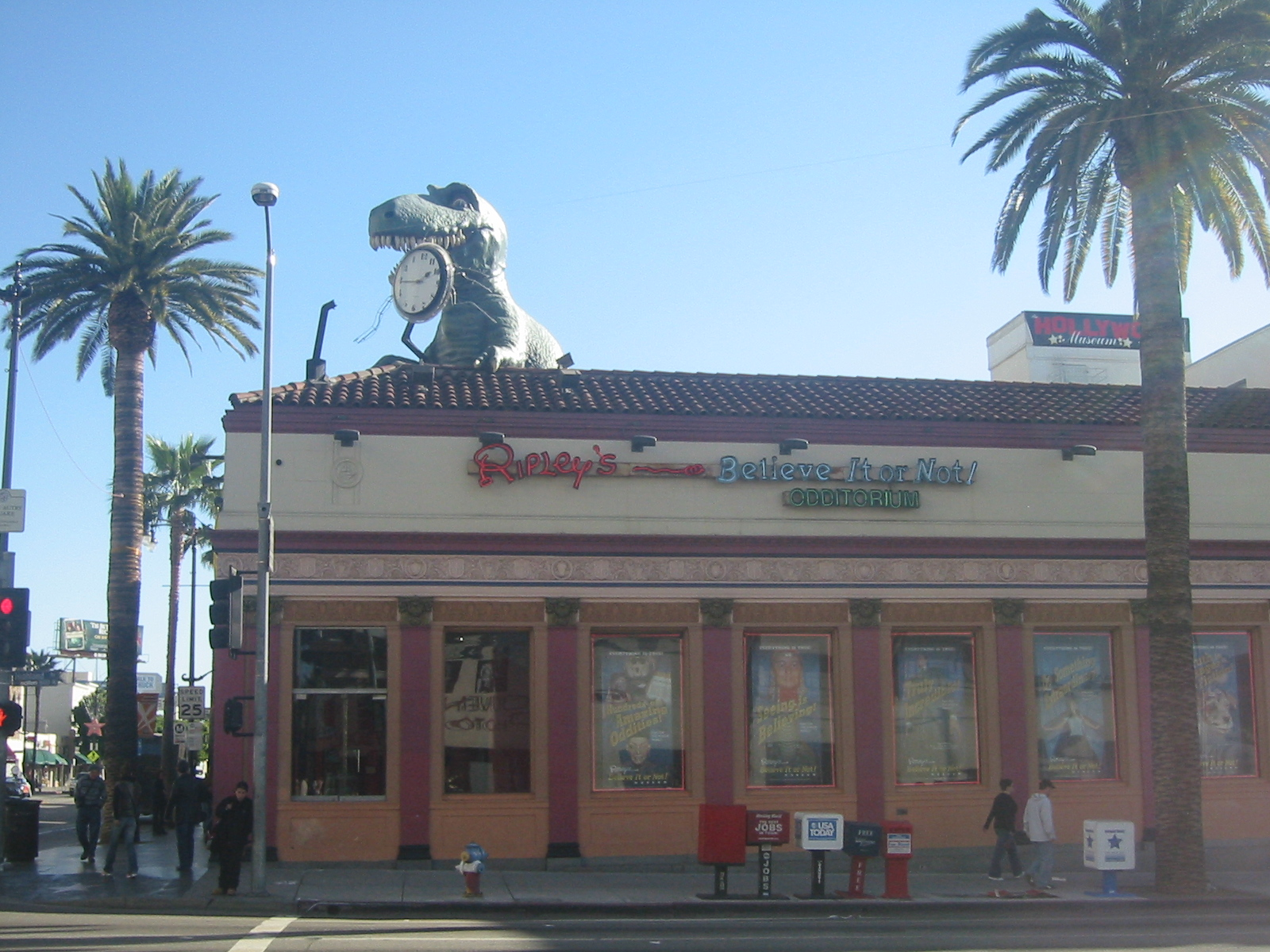
- The building in 2006

- Location within the Los Angeles metropolitan area
- Location: 6780 W. Hollywood Blvd. and 1668 Highland Ave., Hollywood, Los Angeles, California
- Coordinates: 34.1013°N 118.3385°W
- Built: 1914, 1935
- Architect: Morgan, Walls & Clements (1935)
- Architectural style: Beaux Arts
- Part of: Hollywood Boulevard Commercial and Entertainment District (ID85000704)
- Designated CP: April 4, 1985

Hollywood's Bank of America Building, also known as the C.E. Toberman and Co. Building, is a historic building located at 6780 W. Hollywood Boulevard and 1668 Highland Avenue in Hollywood, Los Angeles, California. Named after its former tenant, the building currently houses a Ripley's Believe It or Not! Odditorium.

== History ==
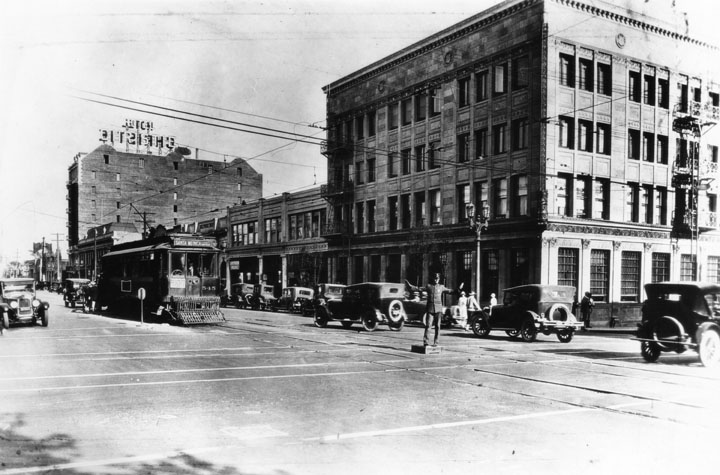
Hollywood Boulevard in the 1920s. The Bank of America Building is at the right.

Bank of America Building was built in 1914 as a four-story apartment complex, with a Bank of America branch on the ground floor and apartments above. Charles E. Toberman was the developer.

In 1935, Morgan, Walls & Clements remodeled the building into a one-story Beaux Arts styled bank, the height reduction done to save costs on seismic upgrading after the 1933 Long Beach earthquake. This building, along with Hollywood First National across the street, anchored the corner of Hollywood and Highland.

In 1985, the Hollywood Boulevard Commercial and Entertainment District was added to the National Register of Historic Places, with Bank of America building listed as a contributing property in the district.

In 1992, a Ripley's Believe It or Not! Odditorium moved into the building, which remains open today and features a 20-foot model Tyrannosaurus rex bursting through the roof and chewing on a clock.

In 2024, Bank of America Building was one of four Hollywood and Highland buildings proposed for demolition to make way for a metro entrance on the K Line Northern Extension. The other buildings are 6806 Hollywood Boulevard, Hollywood Theater, and Lee Drug.

== Architecture and design ==
Bank of America Building features Beaux Arts architecture with classical detailing that includes: a decorated frieze, projecting cornice, Corinthian pilasters, and a flat roof with red tile at the parapet.

== See also ==
- List of contributing properties in the Hollywood Boulevard Commercial and Entertainment District
