= Jacob Kuhrts =

Los Angeles Pioneer

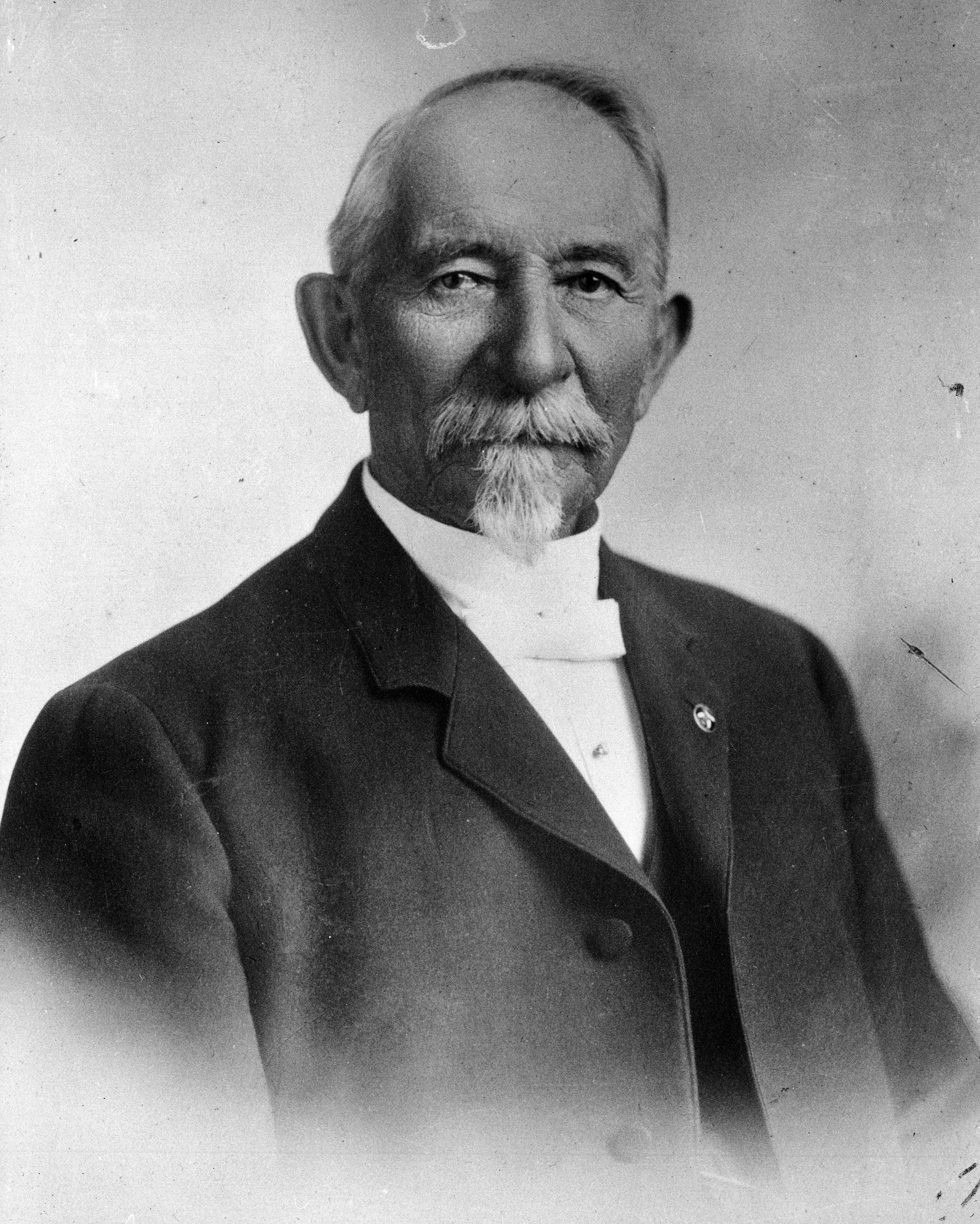
- Kuhrts in 1881

Member of the Los Angeles Common Council for the 2nd ward
- In office December 10, 1888 – February 21, 1889
- In office December 10, 1885 – December 12, 1887
- In office December 5, 1879 – December 8, 1883
- In office December 9, 1875 – December 6, 1877

Personal details
- Born: August 17, 1832 Denmark
- Died: January 29, 1926 (aged 93) Los Angeles, California
- Relatives: John Krempel (son-in-law)

Jacob Kuhrts (August 14, 1836 – January 29, 1926) original spelling Kuhrt), nicknamed "Uncle Jake", left home at age 12 as a cabin-boy on an English clipper and spent 6 years sailing around the world before he eventually disembarked in Monterey, California in 1848. He then spent several years working at the Mission Dolores in San Francisco prior to the discovery of Gold in Placer county when he worked as a miner during the California Gold Rush. Later after travelling south to the small pueblo of Los Angeles around 1859 when the town had a population of less than 5,000, he became active as a teamster, a merchant, Los Angeles County Coroner (1870–1873), the first volunteer Fire Commissioner Chief in Los Angeles (1886–1900), and as a member of the Los Angeles City Council from 1876 to 1877 and again in 1880 when he served as council president. He had the first 2-story brick building constructed in downtown Los Angeles (see picture below dated 1867) which also served as the family compound, retail store, and upstairs rental units.

== Personal ==
=== Birth and death ===
Kuhrts was born on August 17, 1832, in Tönning, Duchy of Schleswig, Denmark. He died at the age of ninety-three in his home, 1103 Arapahoe Street in today's Pico-Union District, on January 29, 1926, and funeral services were conducted at the Masonic Temple, with interment following in Inglewood Park Cemetery. Honorary pallbearers included Albert Workman, Thomas Strohm, Isidore Dockweiler and John Schumacher.

=== Family ===
In a manuscript that transcribed an oral synopsis of his life in 1906, Kuhrts recalled how he changed his "wild life to that of a law-abiding citizen." He said that he tried to attend a dance in the Arcadia block but he was turned away at the door because the management would not admit any "desperadoes in here, for this is a German ball, and people have to dress decently."

By this time I took an inventory of myself and found it not very inviting. ... Fancy a man with his pants on the other side of his boots, partly split open from the hip down and tied with a baling rope; a gray shirt not overly clean; a dirty handkerchief around his neck; a big sombrero on his head; not having shaved for two months, very little soap had touched the face up to this time; and a great dragoon pistol on his hip. I came to the conclusion that I did not look very inviting, so back to the corral I went and hunted up my friend, Mike Nolan, a brother teamster. He was the only one who had a boiled shirt and store clothes, as we called them at the time. I found Mike and he loaned me his "duds."

Admitted to the dance, he met sixteen-year-old Susan Buhn of Germany, and they were married on May 29, 1865. They had five children, sons Henry, George, and Edward, and daughters Emily and Grace. Emily would later marry John Paul Krempel and George would be hired by Henry Huntington as the chief engineer and manager of the Los Angeles Railway (Yellow Cars).

== Vocation ==
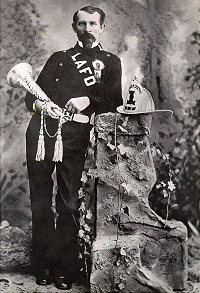
Kuhrts as the Los Angeles Fire Chief.

Kuhrts left home at the age of twelve and became a sailor, voyaging to England, South America, Australia and China. From the latter country he sailed to Monterey, California, in 1848 and debarked, going to San Francisco to work at the Mission Dolores. He was one of the first to experience the 1849 Gold Rush in Placer County, and remained there until 1857, when he traveled with John Searles from San Francisco with a mule team for the Slate Range near Death Valley.

Kuhrts unloaded his teams at the mines, then made his way on an uncharted route to Los Angeles. He later wrote that he went through Red Rock Cañon, "a place I called El Paso, where I was fortunate enough to find water," thence to Cane Springs, Desert Springs, the "Sinks of Tehachapi", Oak Creek, Willow Springs, Elizabeth Lake, San Francisquito Canyon, over San Fernando Pass, "where it took four yoke of cattle and a windlass to bring my team over the pass into the San Fernando Valley."

From 1857 onward he engaged in a transportation business between Los Angeles and the Slate, where he continued mining until 1864. During that period he fought several skirmishes with Indians and oversaw the work of Chinese laborers who were hired to gather sage-brush and greasewood. It was also written that he hauled freight as far as Salt Lake City and Butte, Montana.

After settling in Los Angeles, he worked in a lumberyard until 1865, and in that year or in 1866 he opened a retail store at First and Spring Streets (later the site of the Schumacher Block), moving to First and Main in 1870. The homestead and retail store which he built at corner of First and Main was the first 2-story brick building in Los Angeles. He retired from business in 1878.

The block where the original Kuhrts homestead was built was redeveloped by the city in the 1920s. The current Los Angeles City Hall was built at this location in 1928.

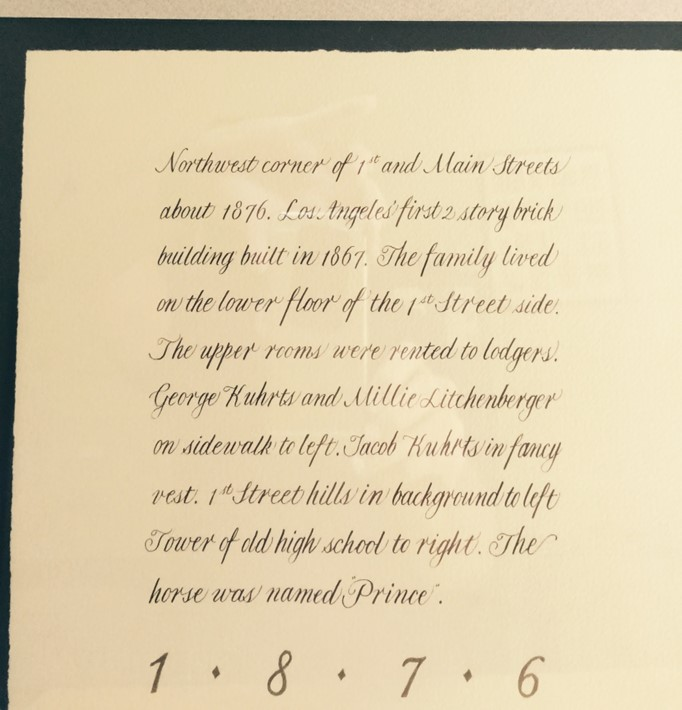
Kuhrts Homestead Caption 1876

== Public service ==
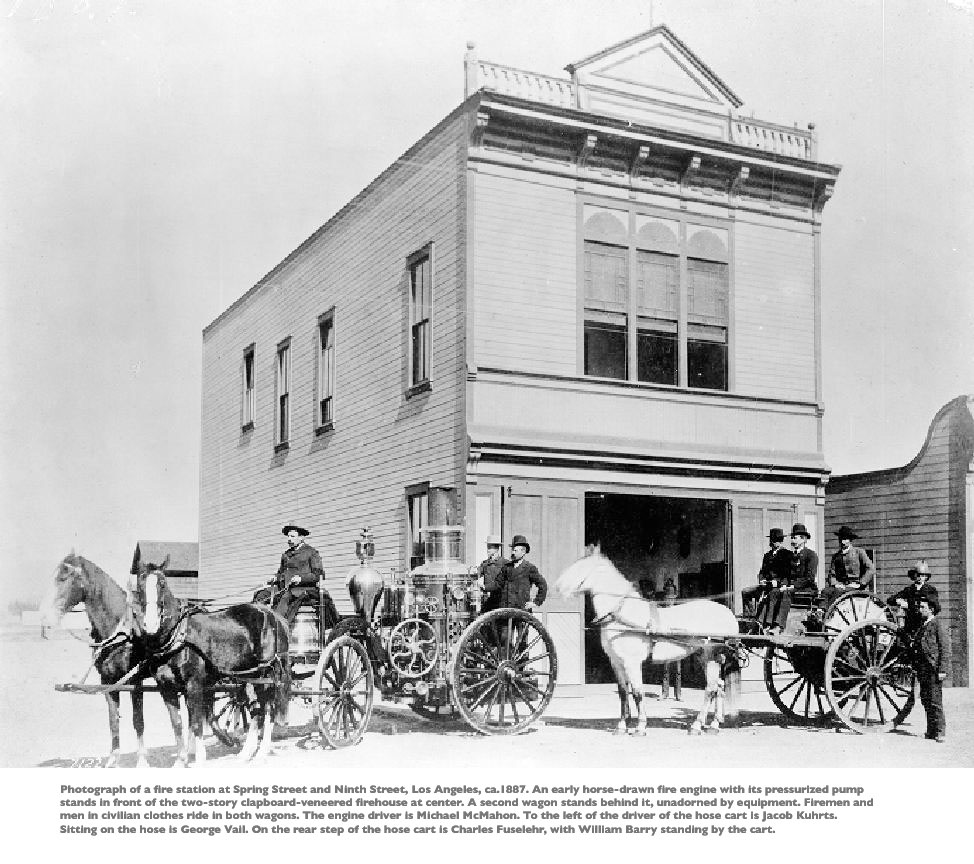
Jacob Kuhrts in front of fire station at Spring St. and Ninth St., 1887

Kuhrts represented the 2nd Ward on the Los Angeles Common Council in 1875–77 and 1879–80; during the latter period he was council president. When he was on the council, Kuhrts "used all [his] influence to help the boys in getting horses to draw the apparatus." Previously the fire engines had to be drawn "though the sand by hand." He was chief of the city's volunteer fire department. and when the fire service was reorganized as a paid department, he became a member of the Fire Commission. He was also on the Police Commission. He was a charter member of Al Malaikah Shrine Temple and at his death the last remaining charter member of the local Turnverein Germania society.

== Legacy ==
In 1886 the Jacob Kuhrts Fire Engine Company No. 3 was established, and the Los Angeles Fire Department ordered its first engine, an Amoskeag Steamer, nicknamed the Kuhrts Steamer. It is now on exhibit at the L.A. Fire Department Museum.

There was also a Kuhrts Street between the Los Angeles River and Mission Road. It is now part of Main Street North.

== References and notes ==
Access to the Los Angeles Times links may require the use of a library card.

== Other reading ==
- History of the Los Angeles Turners recounted by Jacob Kuhrts, "Turn-Verein: Laying the Cornerstone of the New Turnhalle," Los Angeles Times, August 15, 1887, page 1
