= Pico-Union, Los Angeles =

Pico-Union
- Neighborhood of Los Angeles
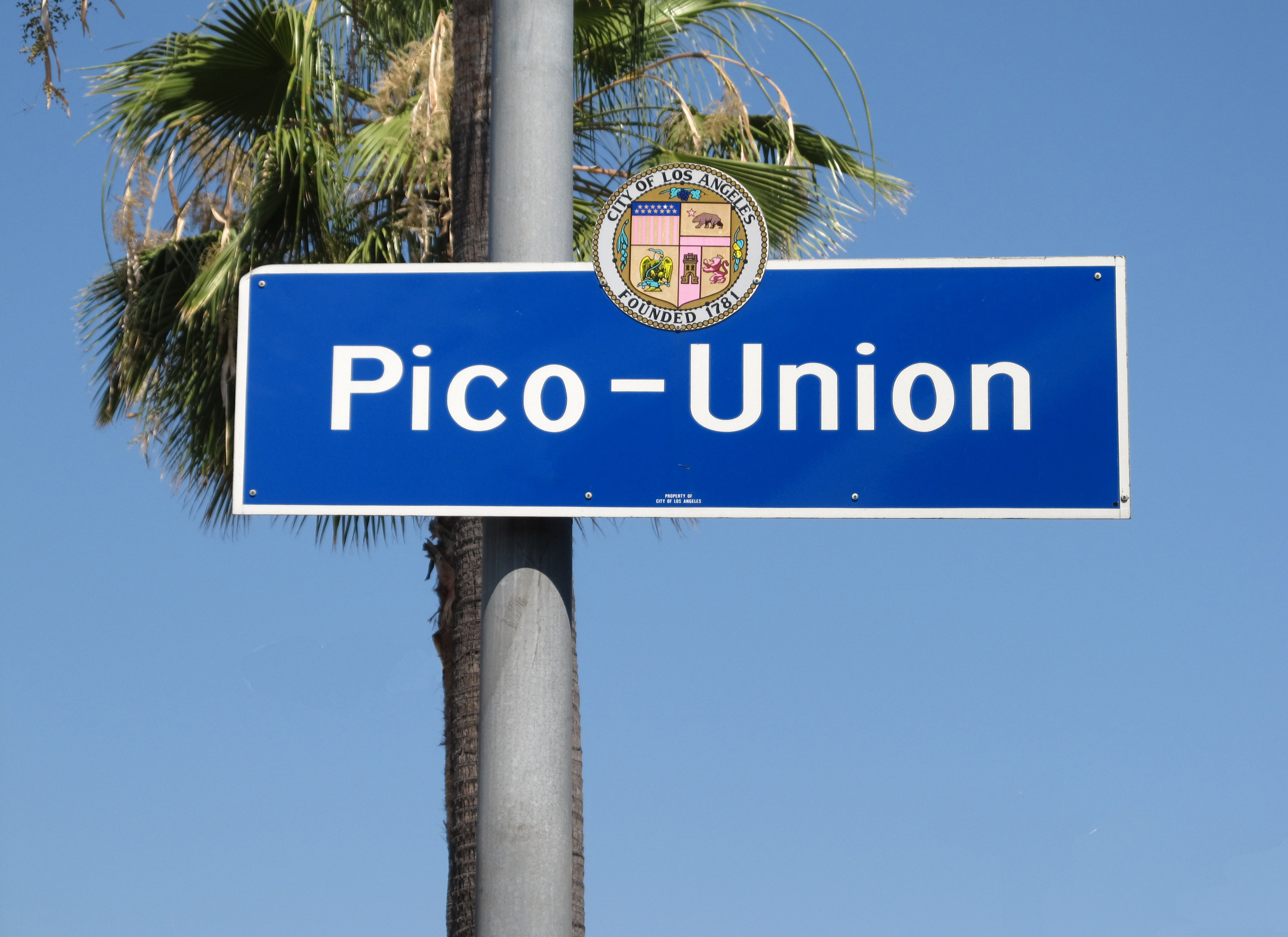
- Pico-Union signage located at Pico Blvd. and Albany Street

- Location within Central Los Angeles
- Coordinates: 34°2′41″N 118°16′37″W
- Country: United States of America
- State: California
- County: Los Angeles
- Time zone: Pacific
- ZIP Codes: 90006, 90007, 90015
- Area code: 213

Pico-Union is a neighborhood in Central Los Angeles, California. The name "Pico-Union" refers to the neighborhood that surrounds the intersection of Pico Boulevard and Union Avenue. Located immediately west of Downtown Los Angeles, it is home to over 40,000 residents.

The neighborhood contains two historic districts, both listed in the National Register of Historic Places.

It has five public schools as well as a public library.

== Geography ==
=== Google Maps ===
Google Maps draws the following boundaries for Pico-Union: Olympic Boulevard on the north, the Harbor Freeway on the east, the Santa Monica Freeway on the south and Hoover St. on the west. (Note: Where other reliable sources are available for the boundaries of neighborhoods, they should be treated preferentially to Google Maps and Google Street View. It is difficult if not impossible to verify as they are subject to change and documentation and archives are not available.)

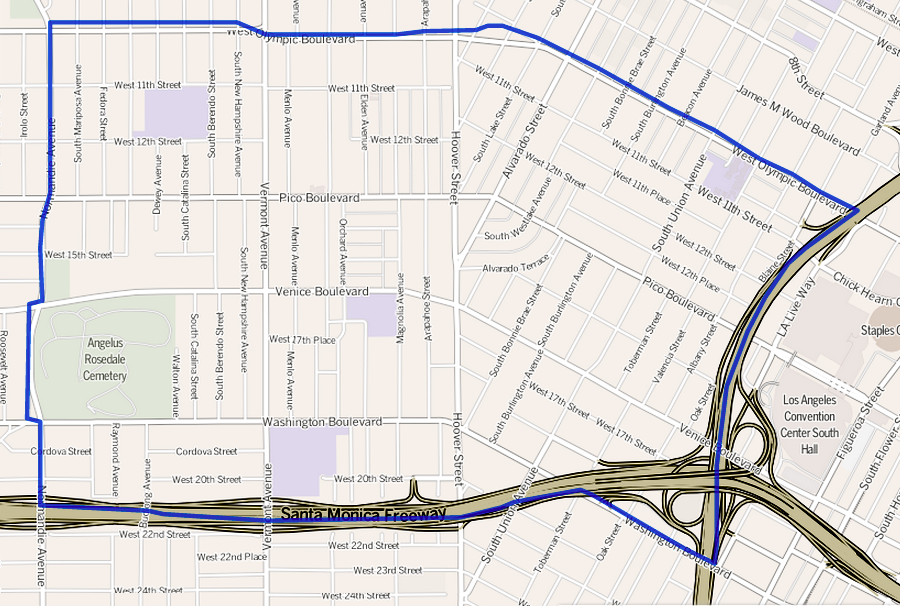
Map of the Pico-Union neighborhood of Los Angeles, as delineated by the Los Angeles Times

=== Mapping L.A. Project ===
According to the Los Angeles Times' Mapping L.A. project, Pico-Union is bounded by Olympic Boulevard on the north, the Harbor Freeway on the east, the Santa Monica Freeway on the south and Normandie Avenue on the west. It also includes the California Highway Patrol station beneath the Dosan Ahn Chang Ho Memorial Interchange northeast of Washington Boulevard.

Pico-Union is flanked by Koreatown and Westlake to the north and northeast, Downtown to the east, Adams-Normandie, University Park and Exposition Park to the south and Harvard Heights to the west.

== History ==
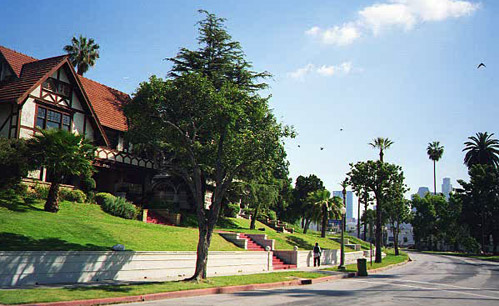
Alvarado Terrace

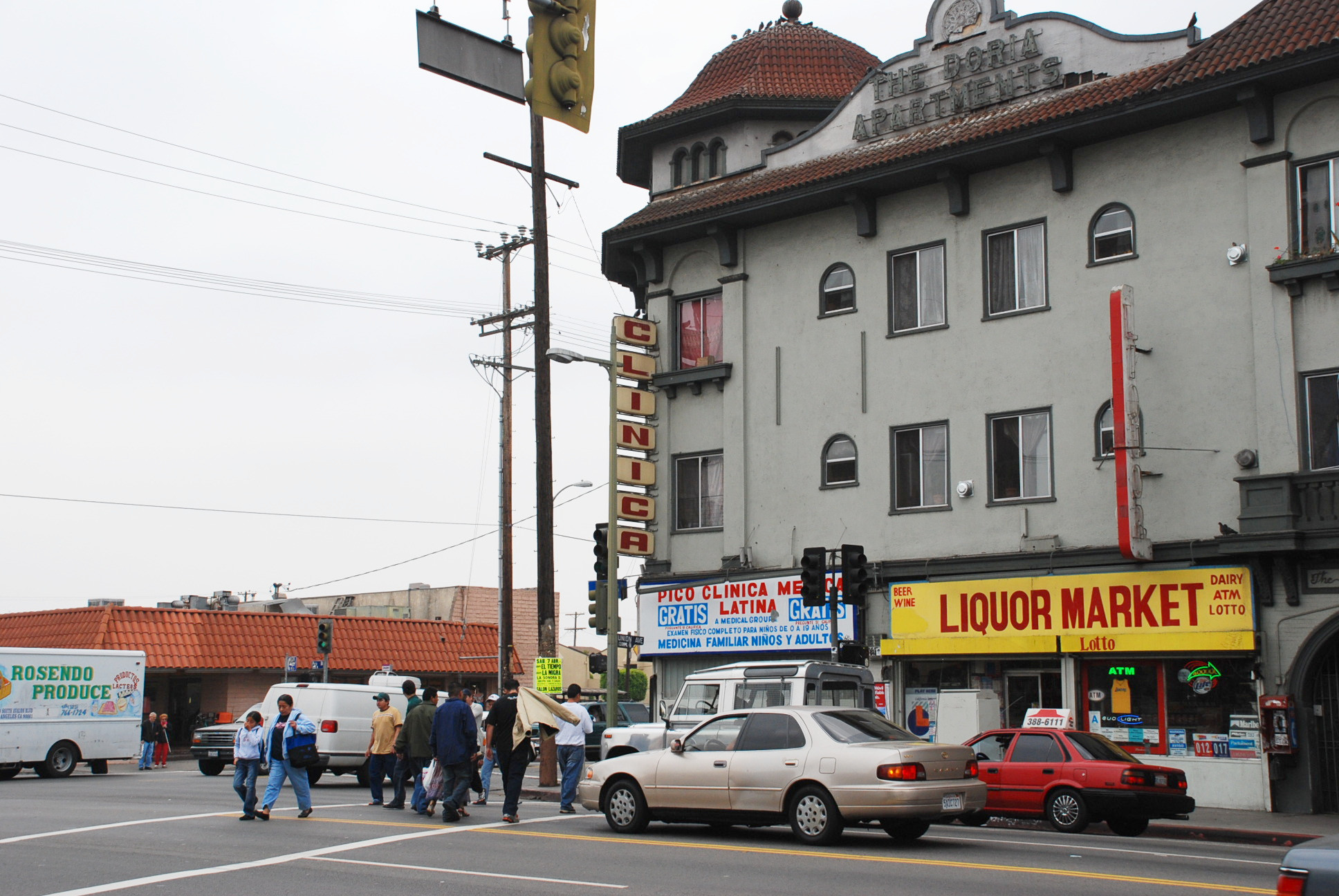
The Doria Apartments, a Los Angeles Historic-Cultural Monument.

The Tongva village of Geveronga was located at the present-site of Pico-Union. It was destroyed in 1781 by Spanish settlers as part of the Anza Expedition who issued a claim to the land and water rights from King Carlos III.

The area was part of the early Pueblo de Los Ángeles settlement in Spanish and Mexican California.

The area encompassed by Pico-Union was developed as a middle and upper middle class residential district beginning in the 1910s. Easy access to downtown Los Angeles and the nearby Wilshire District drew large numbers of affluent homeowners. Following the Second World War, the Pico-Union area, like many inner city neighborhoods, experienced an outflux of residents to the suburbs. The loss of residents and business led to high vacancy rates and lower property values in much of the neighborhood by the 1960s.

In the late 1970s and 1980s, the area became a major point of entry for Salvadoran and Guatemalan immigrants seeking refuge from civil war, according to the Pico Union Self-Guided Walking Tour, published in 2009 by the Los Angeles Conservancy.

Pico-Union became the city's 19th Historic Preservation Overlay Zone on August 10, 2004. It contains two historic districts listed in the National Register of Historic Places: South Bonnie Brae Tract Historic District and Alvarado Terrace Historic District.

In August 2012, the City of Los Angeles designated a portion of Vermont Avenue in Pico-Union as El Salvador Community Corridor; parts of Pico-Union are also being considered for designation as The Central American Historical District.

The former First Church of Christ, Scientist, once one of Jim Jones' Peoples Temples, was located in Pico-Union, at the corner of Alvarado Street and Alvarado Terrace.

== Population ==
Pico-Union is the fourth-most-dense neighborhood in Los Angeles, surpassed only by East Hollywood, Westlake and Koreatown. The 2000 U.S. census counted 42,324 residents in the 1.67-square-miles neighborhood—an average of 25,352 people per square mile. In 2008, the city estimated that the population had increased to 44,664. The median age for residents was 27, considered young for the city and the county.

The ethnic breakdown in 2000 was Latinos, 85.4%; Asians, 7.6%; whites, 3.0%, blacks, 2.9%; and others, 1.1%. El Salvador (44.4%) and Mexico (23.3%) were the most common places of birth for the 64.6% of the residents who were born abroad, a figure that was considered high in comparison with foreign-born in the city as a whole. Other immigrants come from Guatemala, Honduras and Nicaragua.

The median household income in 2008 dollars was $26,424, considered low for both the city and the county. The percentage of households earning $20,000 or less was high, compared to the county at large. The average household size of 3.3 people was relatively high for Los Angeles. Renters occupied 90.5% of the housing units, and home- or apartment owners the rest.

The percentages of never-married men (43.4%) and never-married women (36.2%) were among the county's highest. The census found 2,113 families headed by single parents, the 23.3% rate being considered high for both the city and the county.

In 2000 there were 667 military veterans living in Pico-Union, or 2.3% of the population, considered a low rate for the city and the county overall.

== Education ==
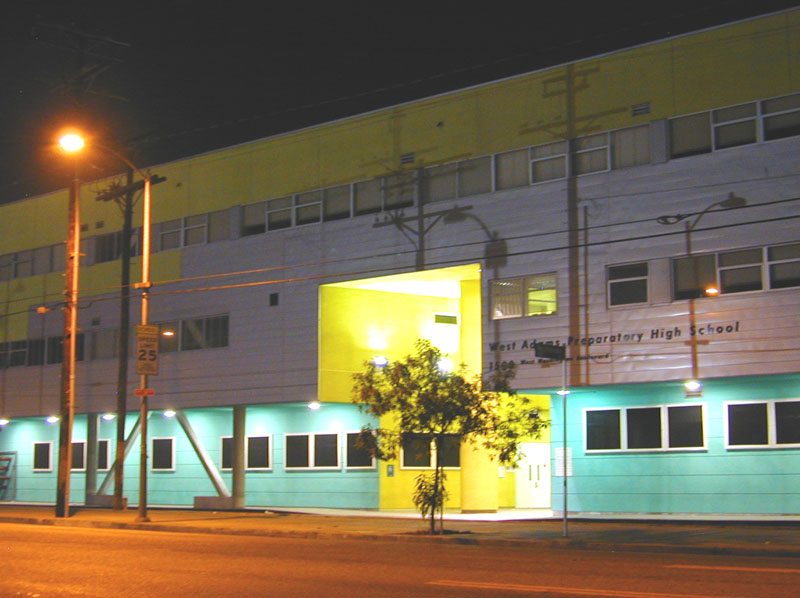
West Adams Preparatory High School

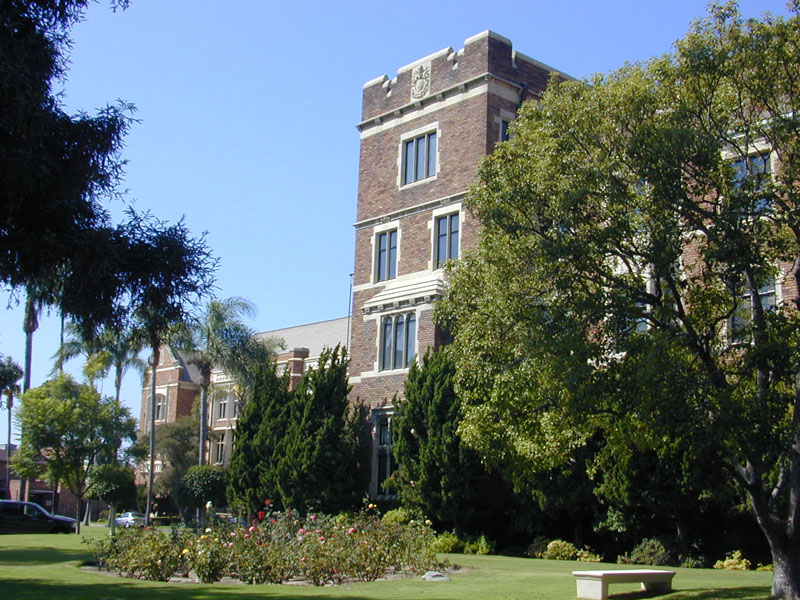
Loyola High School

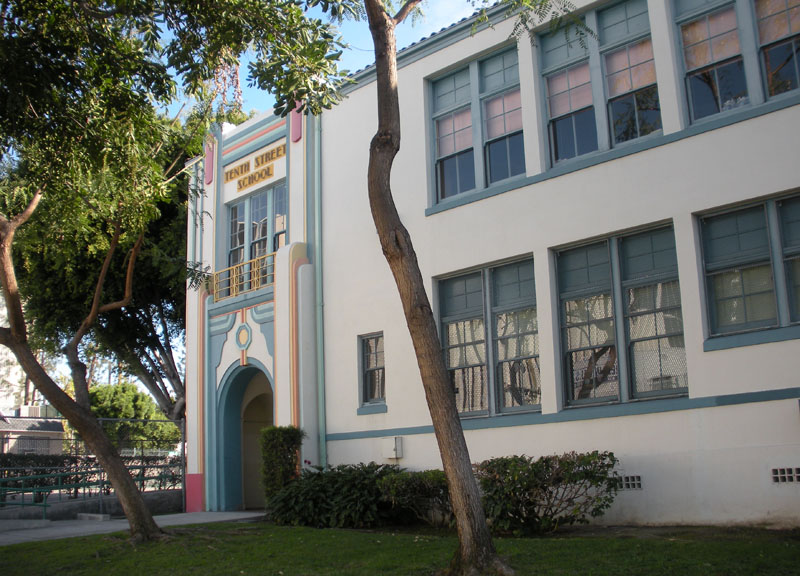
Tenth Street School

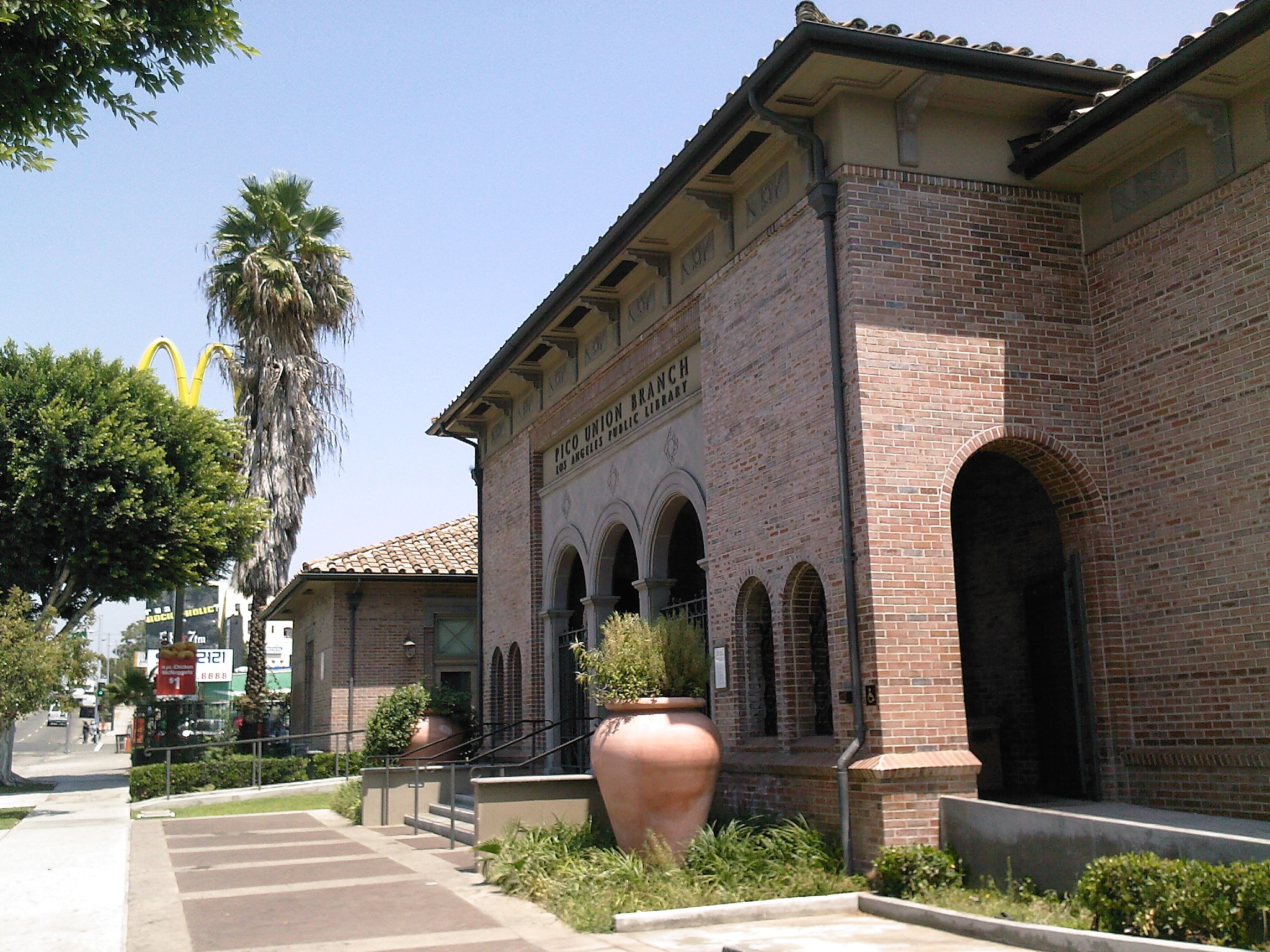
Pico-Union Branch Library

Pico-Union residents aged 25 and older holding a four-year degree amounted to 6.7% of the population in 2000, considered low for both the city and the county, and there was a high percentage of residents with less than a high school diploma.

=== Schools ===
These are the elementary or secondary schools within the neighborhood's boundaries:

- West Adams Preparatory High School, LAUSD, 1500 West Washington Boulevard
- SIATech Pico-Union is a public charter high school, 2140 West Olympic Boulevard suite 327. "Classes are held from approximately 9:00 am - 4:00 pm. This site is an independent study school where students complete work at home, online and on site."
- Loyola High School of Los Angeles, private, 1901 Venice Boulevard
- Berendo Middle School, LAUSD, 1157 South Berendo Street, which claims the title as the oldest intermediate school continuously in operation in Los Angeles and perhaps in the entire United States
- Sophia T. Salvin Special Education Center, LAUSD, 1925 Budlong Avenue
- Leo Politi Elementary School, LAUSD, 2481 West 11th Street
- Tenth Street Elementary School, LAUSD, 1000 Grattan Street
- Saint Thomas the Apostle School, private elementary, 2632 West 15th Street
- Magnolia Avenue Elementary School, LAUSD, 1626 South Orchard Avenue
- Los Angeles Christian School, private, 1630 West 20th Street
- Equitas Academy Charter Schools, charter, 1700 West Pico Boulevard

=== Public library ===
Los Angeles Public Library operates the Pico-Union Branch Library at 1030 South Alvarado Street.

== Cemetery ==
Angelus-Rosedale Cemetery was founded as Rosedale Cemetery in 1884, when Los Angeles was a small city of around 28,000 people, on 65 acres (260,000 m^{2}) of land between Washington and Venice boulevards (then 16th Street) between Normandie Avenue and Walton and Catalina Streets.

== Notable people ==
- Larry Elder, talk show host and politician
- Elizabeth Harrower (1918 - 2003), actress, writer
- Jim Jones, founder and the leader of the Peoples Temple
- Jacob Kuhrts, 19th Century Los Angeles businessman and politician
- Pomeroy Wills Powers, president, Los Angeles City Council, 1900–02
- Susan Seaforth Hayes, actress

== See also ==
- List of districts and neighborhoods of Los Angeles
- Alvarado Terrace Historic District
- Curacao Department Store, 1605 W. Olympic Boulevard at Union Avenue
- History of the Central Americans in Los Angeles
