= Community Laundry Company Building =

Historic industrial building in Los Angeles, California

- Location within the Los Angeles metropolitan area

General information
- Architectural style: Mayan Revival
- Location: 900-930 North Highland Avenue, Hollywood, California
- Coordinates: 34.0874°N 118.3379°W
- Named for: Community Laundry Company
- Year built: 1927

Design and construction
- Architect: W. J. Saunders

Los Angeles Historic-Cultural Monument
- Designated: February 6, 2019
- Reference no.: 1175

Community Laundry Company Building is a historic industrial building located at 900-930 North Highland Avenue in Hollywood, California. It was designated a Los Angeles Historic-Cultural Monument in 2019.

== History ==
Community Laundry Company was established by C. C. Craig and several motion picture actors in 1923. The Community Laundry Company Building was designed for the company by W. J. Saunders and built in 1927, while a detached boiler house was built the following year. The building, which cost $500,000 ($9.27 million in 2025) to construct, is located in Hollywood's industrial district and as of 2018 has been in continuous use as a laundry facility. $300,000 ($5.56 million in 2025) worth of equipment were installed in building for its opening, which employed approximately 450 people.

The building was designated Los Angeles Historic-Cultural Monument No. 1175 on February 6, 2019.

== Architecture and design ==
Community Laundry Company Building is a two-story industrial building and features a Mayan Revival design. The building is made of concrete and rectangular in plan with one chamfered corner and a flat roof. The roof corner opposite the chamfered corner features a freight elevator penthouse. The building's exterior is scored in an ashlar pattern and also features cornice, a stringcourse, and geometric precast concrete block pilasters covered with concentric circles and rectangles.

The building's main entrance is accented by brick, centered on one of the elevations whose corner is chamfered, and consists of a non-original fully glazed metal door with a transom and sidelights. Both elevations whose corner is chamfered feature second-story shallow balconettes with decorative wrought iron railings. Fenestration consists of multi-lite steel windows with operable awning sashes and is obscured by non-original metal screens on the ground floor. The first floor of one of the elevations opposite the chamfered corner elevations contains eleven loading bays.

The building's interior features more than 60,000 square feet (5,600 m^{2}) of floorspace.

Alterations to the building include: parapet modification in 1960, fire damage repair in 1979, mezzanine addition in 1980, steel canopy installation in 1984, and the installation of two wall signs in 2002. Additional alterations at unknown dates include infilling a secondary entrance, the addition of awnings, and exterior door replacement.
