= South Bonnie Brae Tract Historic District =

Historic district in California, United States

- U.S. National Register of Historic Places
- U.S. Historic district
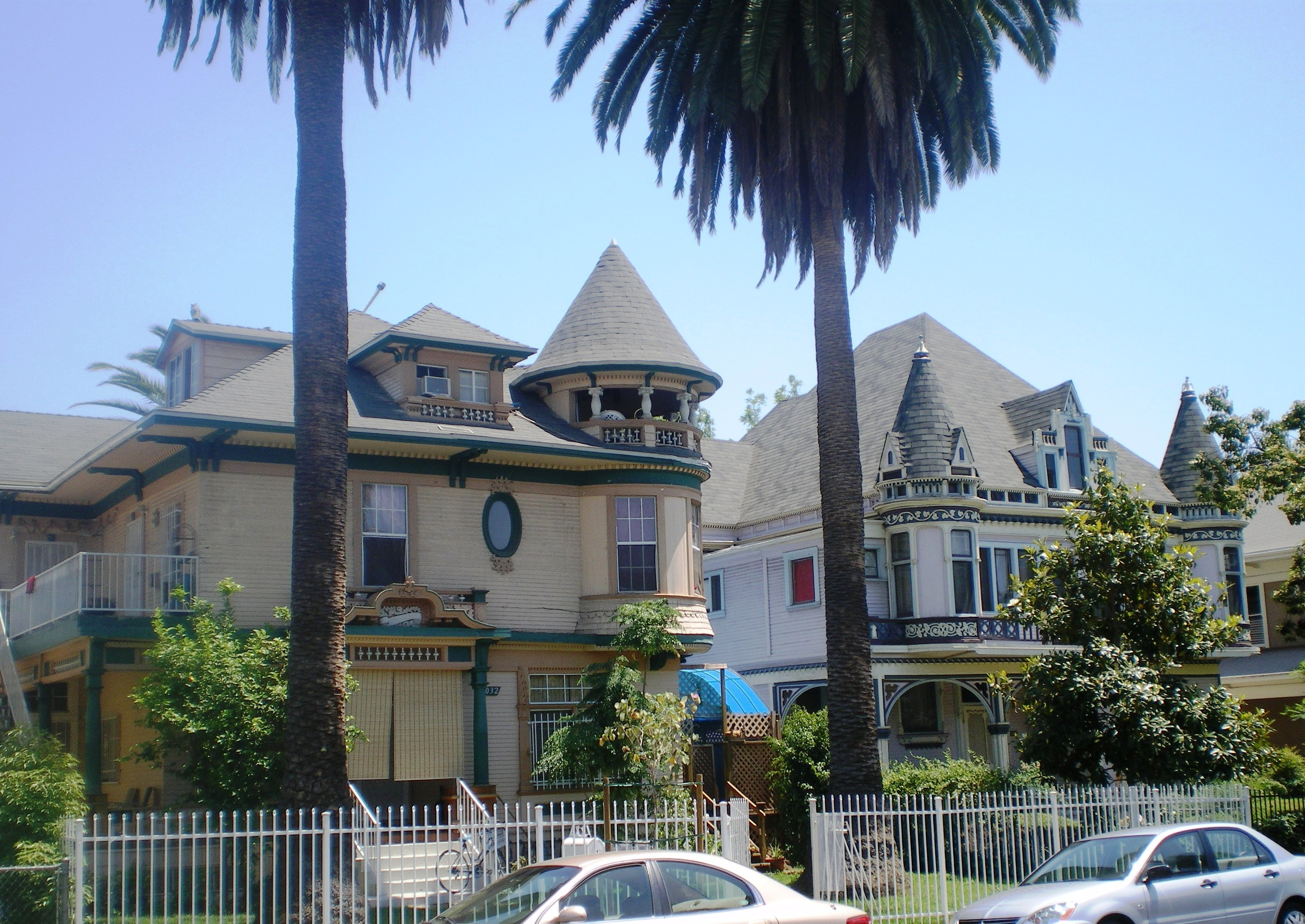
- Houses at 1032 and 1036 S. Bonnie Brae St.

- Location within Los Angeles
- Location: 1026–1053 S. Bonnie Brae St. and 1830–1851 W. Eleventh St., Los Angeles, California
- Coordinates: 34°3′0″N 118°16′39″W
- Area: 3.2 acres (1.3 ha)
- Built: 1890
- Architect: Multiple
- Architectural style: Colonial Revival, Late Victorian, Queen Anne
- NRHP reference No.: 87002401
- Added to NRHP: January 14, 1988

The South Bonnie Brae Tract Historic District is a historic district of Victorian houses in Los Angeles, California, along the 1000 block of South Bonnie Brae Street and the 1800 block of West 11th Street in the Pico Union section of the city. The homes in the district date to the 1890s and reflect Queen Anne and Colonial Revival architecture. Based on its well-preserved period architecture, the district was added to the National Register of Historic Places in 1988.

The listing included 15 contributing buildings on 3.2 acres (1.3 ha).

The Athletic Model Guild was located in the district at the intersection of 11th and Bonnie Brae Streets.

== See also ==
- List of Los Angeles Historic-Cultural Monuments in the Wilshire and Westlake areas
- Frederick Mitchell Mooers House — landmark Victorian house 2 blocks north on South Bonnie Brae.
- List of Registered Historic Places in Los Angeles
