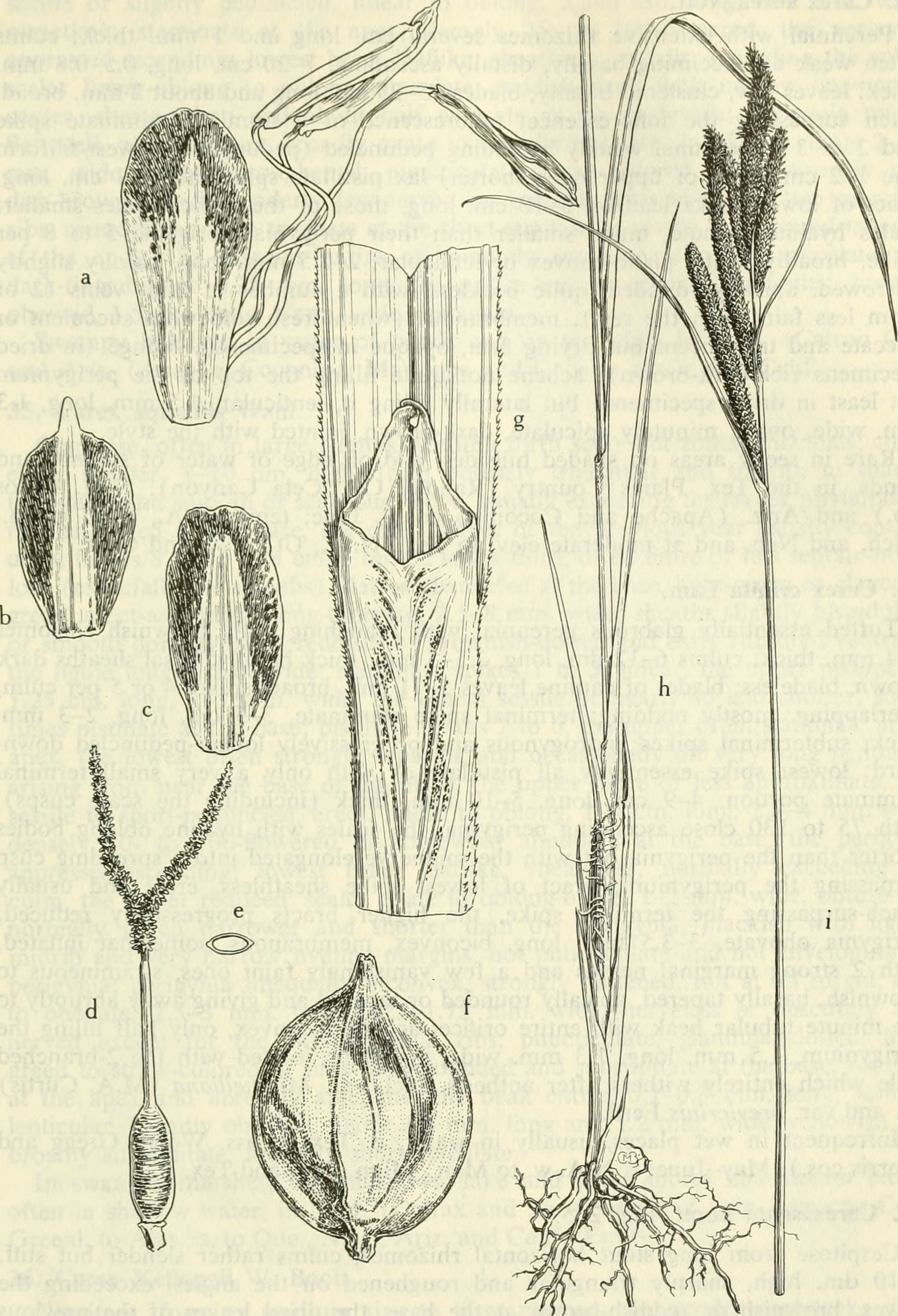

Scientific classification
- Kingdom: Plantae
- Clade: Tracheophytes
- Clade: Angiosperms
- Clade: Monocots
- Clade: Commelinids
- Order: Poales
- Family: Cyperaceae
- Genus: Carex
- Species: C. senta

Binomial name
- Carex senta Boott

= Carex senta =

Species of grass-like plant

Carex senta, known as swamp carex, is a species of sedge that was first described by Francis Boott in 1867. It is found in western North America.
