= Highland Avenue (Los Angeles) =

Road in Los Angeles, California, United States

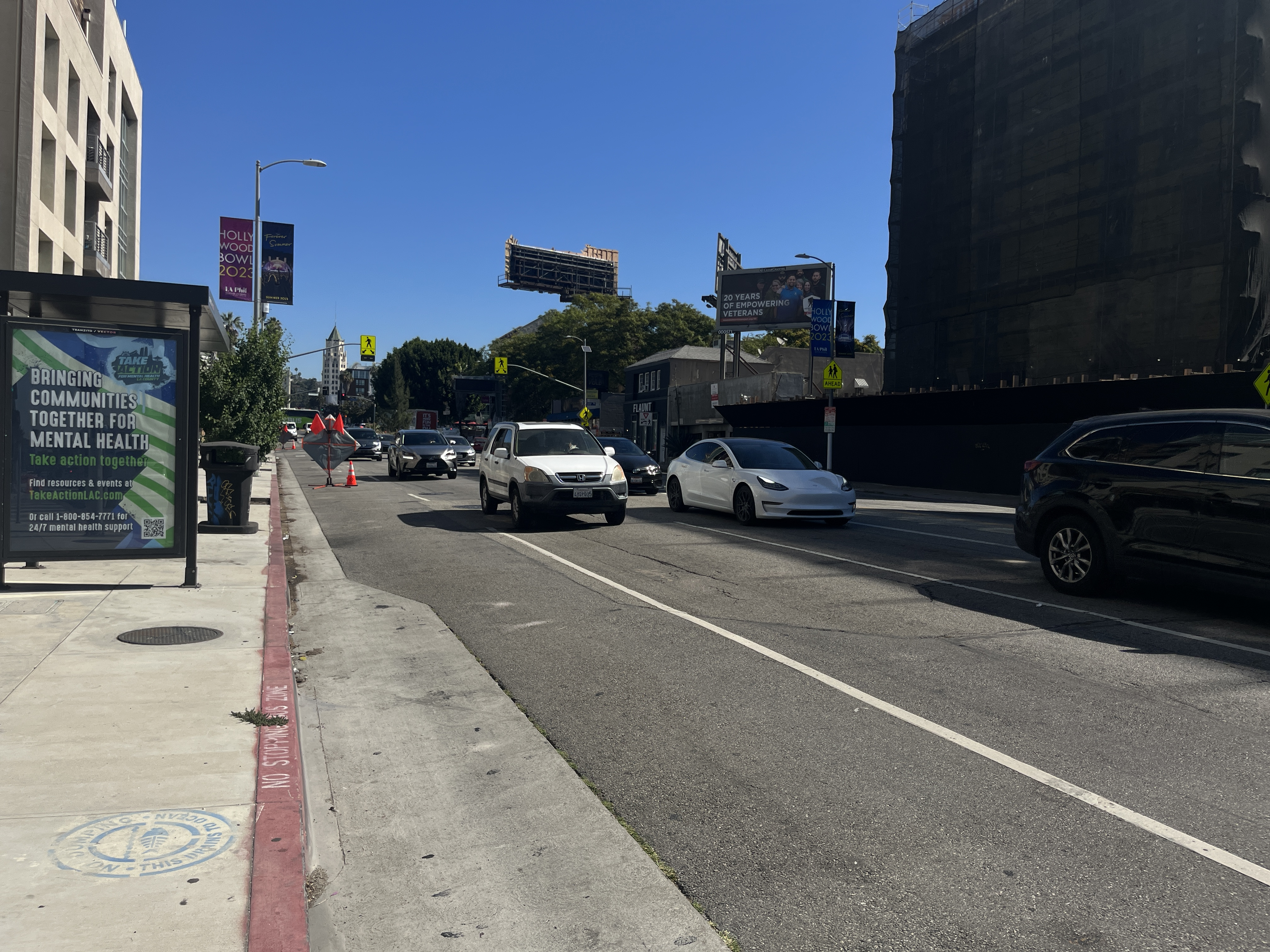
- North Highland Avenue, July 2023
- Namesake: Highland Mary Price
- Location: Los Angeles County, California, U.S.
- Nearest metro station: Hollywood/Highland
- South end: Washington Boulevard
- Major junctions: SR 2 Hollywood Boulevard
- North end: US 101 / Cahuenga Boulevard

Highland Avenue is a major north–south thoroughfare in the Hollywood neighborhood of Los Angeles. The road is primarily situated between Cahuenga Boulevard/U.S. Route 101 at the north and Wilshire Boulevard in Mid-Wilshire at the south, and continues as residential street from Wilshire Boulevard to Washington Boulevard in Mid-City.

== Name ==
Highland Avenue was named after Highland Mary Price, a Hollywood resident who died from a brain tumor in 1901.

== Description ==
Highland Avenue runs north-south between Cahuenga Boulevard/U.S. Route 101 and Washington Boulevard. It travels through the Los Angeles neighborhoods of Hollywood, Hancock Park, Mid-Wilshire, and Mid-City.

Highland contains four lanes for most of its length, but narrows to two from south of Wilshire Boulevard to Washington Boulevard. Furthermore, Highland is broken up three times south of Wilshire, at Edgewood Place, San Vicente Boulevard, and Venice Boulevard. For through access, Highland traffic merges onto Edgewood Place which accesses La Brea Avenue.

The segment of Highland from U.S. Route 101 to Santa Monica Boulevard in Hollywood was once designated as part of California State Route 170. California's legislature has since relinquished control of that segment, and the portion is now maintained by the City of Los Angeles.

== Landmarks ==
The Hollywood Bowl is located at the northern end of Highland, just south of U.S. Route 101. The Hollywood Heritage Museum, Highland-Camrose Bungalow Village, Hollywood Art Center School, American Legion Post 43, and Roman Gardens are also located on Highland in this area, as is Hollywood United Methodist Church, located at Highland and Franklin Avenue.

Further south is Hollywood and Highland, the northwest corner of which was formerly home to the Hollywood Hotel and currently home to Ovation Hollywood and the Dolby Theatre. Hollywood First National, Lee Drug, and Bank of America Building are also located at this intersection, as is the B Line's Hollywood/Highland station. The intersection itself is named Gene Autry Square, after the actor, musician, and businessman who was instrumental in developing the entertainment industry in this area.

Continuing south, half a block from Hollywood and Highland is the Hollywood Museum and Mel's Drive-In located in the former Max Factor Salon, and across the street and half a block south from that is Hollywood High School, which continues south to the corner of Sunset Boulevard and Highland. Near the entrance to the school, the intersection of Highland and Selma is named Carol Burnett Square, after the actress and comedian who once went to school there.

Further south, Klasky Csupo is headquartered on Highland just south of Fountain Avenue, and south of that, Highland and Santa Monica Boulevard is named Steve McQueen Square, after the actor and racing driver. Hollywood Storage Company Building is also on Highland south of this intersection. Community Laundry Company Building is located several blocks further south.

Queen and Washingtonia Robusta Palm Trees and Median Strip
- Interactive map of Queen and Washingtonia Robusta Palm Trees and Median Strip
- 34.07005°N 118.33859°W
- Location: Highland Ave between Wilshire Blvd and Melrose Ave

Los Angeles Historic-Cultural Monument
- Designated: 1972
- Reference no.: 94

Highland's median parkway between Melrose Avenue and Wilshire Boulevard features queen palms and Mexican fan palms that were planted in 1928 and designated Los Angeles Historic-Cultural Monument No. 94 in 1972. The intersection of Highland and 3rd Street, also in this section, is named Moshe Rubin Memorial Square.

== Transit ==
The B Line stops at Hollywood and Highland. The K Line Northern Extension also plans to terminate on Highland, either at Hollywood and Highland or the Hollywood Bowl.

The Los Angeles Department of Transportation runs the Hollywood DASH line in a clockwise and counterclockwise loop around Hollywood. This line travels on Highland between Fountain Avenue and Hollywood Boulevard.
