= Afton Arms Apartments =

Historic building in Hollywood, California

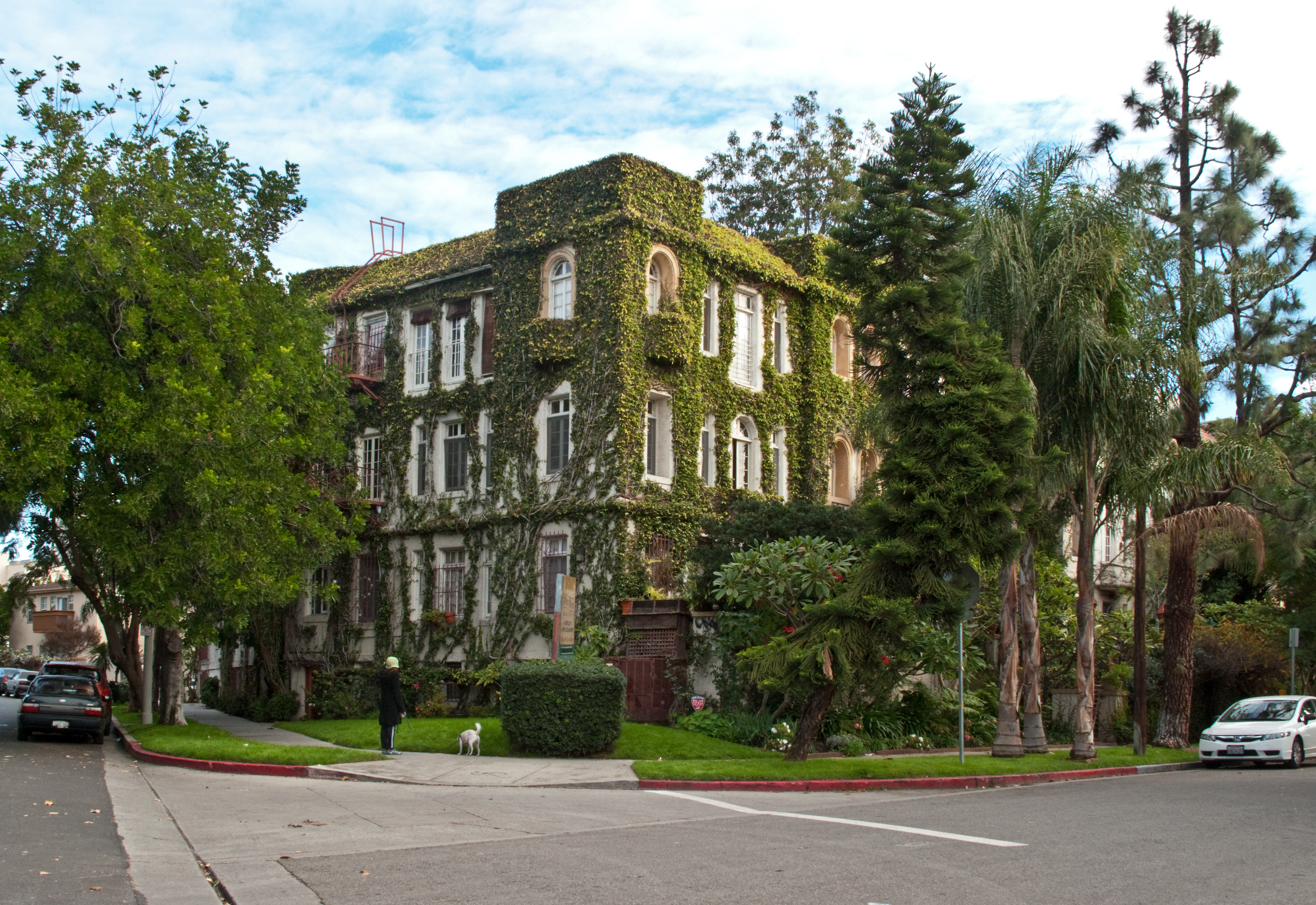
- The building in 2012
- Interactive map of the Afton Arms Apartments area

General information
- Location: 6141 Afton Place, Hollywood, California
- Coordinates: 34.0955°N 118.3236°W
- Year built: 1924
- Opened: May 1925

Technical details
- Floor count: 3

Design and construction
- Architect: Leland Bryant

Los Angeles Historic-Cultural Monument
- Designated: November 3, 1989
- Reference no.: 463

Afton Arms Apartments, also known as Happy Malaga Castle, is a historic apartment complex located at 6141 Afton Place in Hollywood, California.

== History ==
Afton Arms Apartments was designed by Leland Bryant, the architect who later designed the nearby La Fontaine Building, Le Trianon Apartments, The Fontenoy, and Sunset Towers. This building was built in 1924 and opened in May 1925.

According to the Los Angeles Times, the Hollywood Ten used Afton Arms Apartment's grand ballroom for meetings after World War II and in the 1960s and 70s, the Hollywood Free Press was published in that same ballroom. The FBI raided the building in 1981 after being tipped off that the publisher of the Hollywood Free Press was storing explosives in the building's basement.

The building was renamed Happy Malaga Castle in 1972, at which point it was known for its all-night parties and drug use, with the police often called to the building several times per day. In 1988, Red Hot Chili Peppers guitarist Hillel Slovak died of a drug overdose in the building.

New management took over the building c. 1986, after which the building was cleaned up and the drug dealers kicked out. The vines that cover the building's facade were also planted during this time.

The building was designated Los Angeles Historic Cultural Monument #463 on November 3, 1989.
