= La Leyenda Apartments =

Historic building in Hollywood, California

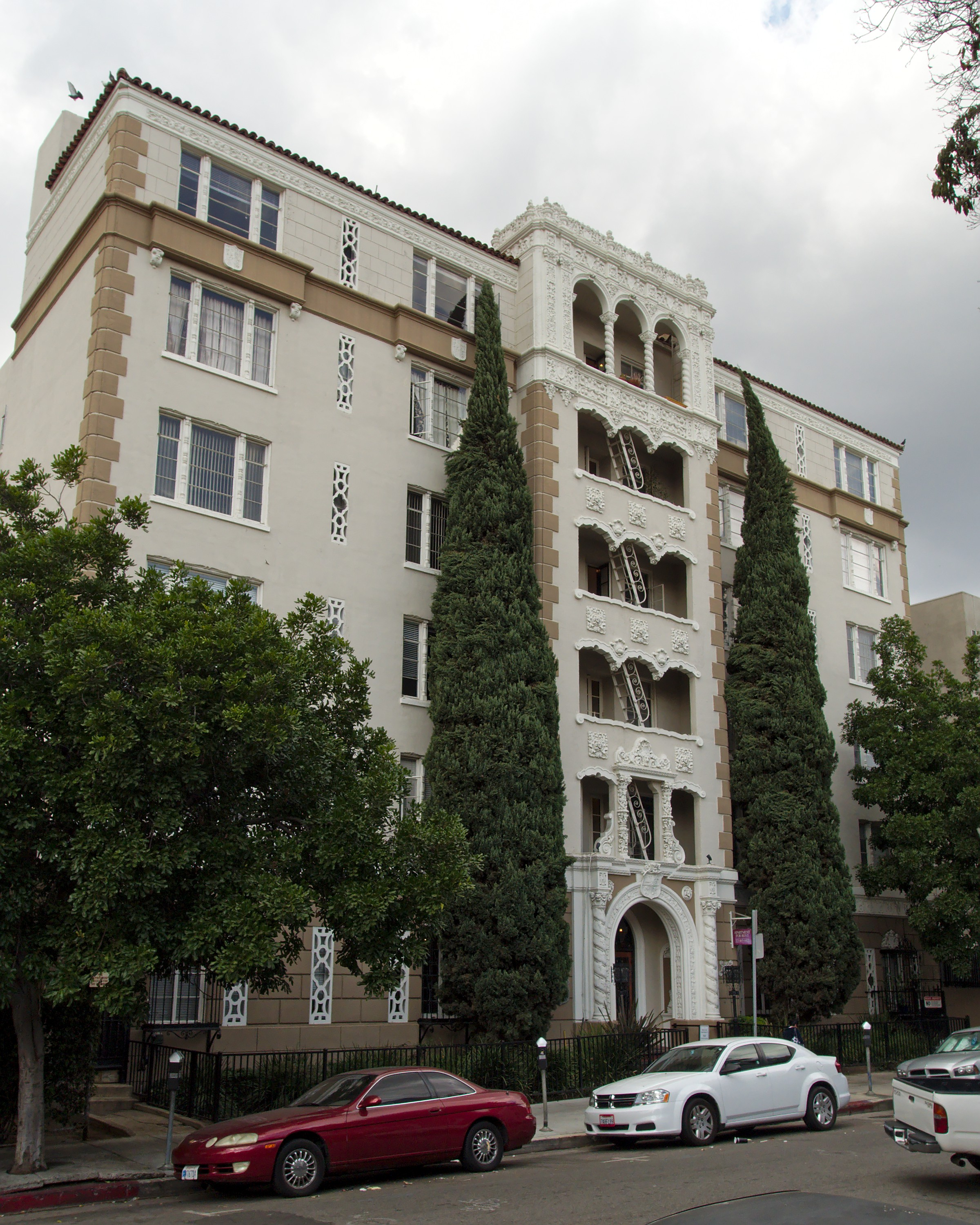
- The building in 2015
- Interactive map of the La Leyenda Apartments area

General information
- Architectural style: Spanish Colonial Revival
- Location: 1735-1737 N Whitley Ave, Hollywood, California
- Coordinates: 34.1028°N 118.3335°W
- Year built: 1927

Technical details
- Floor count: 6

Design and construction
- Architect: Leland A. Bryant

Los Angeles Historic-Cultural Monument
- Designated: July 13, 2005
- Reference no.: 817

La Leyenda Apartments is a historic apartment complex located in the neighborhood of Whitley Heights in Hollywood, California, United States. Its address is 1735-1737 North Whitley Avenue. The Spanish Colonial Revival style apartment building was designed by architect Leland A. Bryant in 1927. La Leyenda Apartments was designated as Los Angeles Historic Cultural Monument in 2005.

== History ==
La Leyenda Apartments was designed by Leland A. Bryant, the same architect responsible for the nearby Le Trianon Apartments, The Fontenoy, and Sunset Towers. This building, located at 1735-1737 North Whitley Avenue in the Whitley Heights neighborhood of Hollywood, California, was built in 1927.

In 1940, La Leyenda Apartments was advertised as offering "Luxurious Refinement", with daily service and a garden. Some of its residents in the 1930s included Mr. and Mrs. William Swanfellow who owned a gold mine in the San Francisco area and Mr. and Mrs. John Priestly Hart, the latter being the John Deere representative for the West Coast of the United States.

La Leyenda Apartments was designated as Los Angeles Historic Cultural Monument #817 on July 13, 2005. It is located in an area overseen by the Hollywood Hills West Neighborhood Council and the Los Angeles's 13th City Council district.

== Architecture and design ==
La Leyenda Apartments is a six-story building that was executed in the Spanish Colonial Revival style. Its exterior is of stucco and features ornate Churrigueresque cast stone detailing and columns around its entrance and railings. The building also has decorative ironwork, a low pitch tile roof, and a limited number of entrances. The building also has a formal garden.

Inside, the building has ceramic tile that cover the walls and floors. The apartments are one, two, and three bedrooms.
