= Fontenoy =

Fontenoy (French pronunciation: [fɔ̃tənwa]) may refer to:

- Battle of Fontenoy (841)
- Battle of Fontenoy (1745)
- Fontenoy (novel) by Liam Mac Cóil
- The Fontenoy, an apartment building in Hollywood, California

== People ==
- Maud Fontenoy (born 1977), French sailor

== Places ==
=== Belgium ===
- Fontenoy, Antoing, a village in the municipality of Antoing, Belgium

=== France ===
- Fontenoy, Aisne, in the Aisne département
- Fontenoy, Yonne, in the Yonne département
- Fontenoy-la-Joûte, in the Meurthe-et-Moselle département (a book town)
- Fontenoy-le-Château, in the Vosges département
- Fontenoy-sur-Moselle, in the Meurthe-et-Moselle département

=== United States ===
- Fontenoy, Wisconsin, an unincorporated community in Brown County, Wisconsin

== See also ==
- Fontenay (disambiguation)
