= Voltaire Apartments =

Historic building in West Hollywood, California

- Interactive map of the Voltaire Apartments area
- Alternative names: Granville Towers

General information
- Architectural style: French Revival
- Location: 1424 North Crescent Heights Boulevard, West Hollywood, California
- Coordinates: 34.0970°N 118.3655°W
- Year built: 1928, 1929, or 1930

Technical details
- Floor count: 7 or 8-9

Design and construction
- Architects: Leland Bryant and Samuel Coine

Voltaire Apartments, also known as Granville Towers, is a historic apartment complex located at 1424 North Crescent Heights Boulevard in West Hollywood, California. The building is known for the many actors and celebrities who have lived in it.

== History ==
Voltaire Apartments, built in 1928, 1929, or 1930, was designed by Leland Bryant, the architect also responsible for the nearby La Fontaine Building and Sunset Towers, and Samuel Coine. The cost of construction was $300,000 ($5.78 million in 2025) and upon completion, it was the largest apartment building in West Hollywood.

On February 20, 1935, a fire caused an estimated $150,000 ($3.52 million in 2025) in damages to the building. One firefighter, D. W. Woods, died when he fell from the roof while fighting the fire, and six others were injured, two seriously. 150 individuals lived in the building at the time, including Kathlyn Williams, Alan Hale, Ralph Graves, and Maureen O'Sullivan. John Farrow's car was parked in the building's parking garage at the time of the fire as well.

Additional notable figures who've lived in Voltaire Apartments include Marilyn Monroe, Rock Hudson, David Bowie, Nora Ephron, Portia de Rossi, and Ashley Greene. Green burned her unit down in 2013, causing three injuries and the death of one dog.

The building was designated a West Hollywood Cultural Resource in 2016.

== Architecture and design ==
The building is U-shaped in plan and features a French Revival design with a steep roof whose lowest point is approx. 100 feet (30 m) above the ground. The building has been reported as having seven and eight-to-nine stories.
