= Romanesque Villa Apartments =

Historic building in West Hollywood, California

- U.S. Historic district – Contributing property
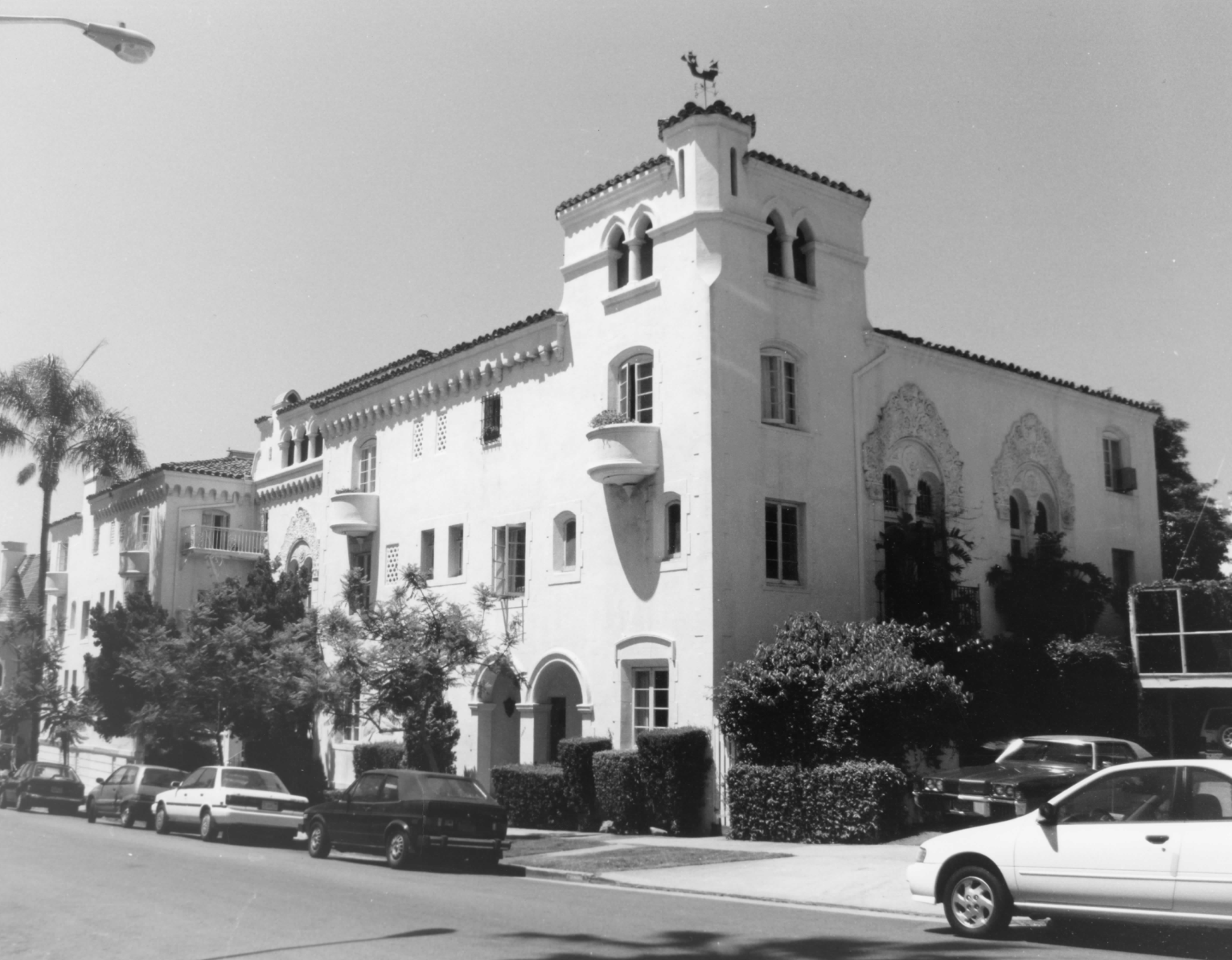
- The building in 1996

- Location within the Los Angeles metropolitan area
- Location: 1301-09 North Harper Avenue, West Hollywood, California
- Coordinates: 34.0949°N 118.3691°W
- Built: 1928
- Architect: Leland Bryant
- Architectural style: Spanish Colonial Revival
- Part of: North Harper Avenue Historic District (ID96000694)
- Designated CP: May 28, 1996

Romanesque Villa Apartments is a historic three-story apartment complex located at 1301-09 North Harper Avenue, on the corner of Harper and Fountain Avenue, in West Hollywood, California.

== History ==
Romanesque Villa Apartments was designed for Michael and Isaac Mann by Leland Bryant, the architect also responsible for the nearby La Fontaine Building and Sunset Towers, and built in 1928.

In 1996, the North Harper Avenue Historic District was added to the National Register of Historic Places, with Romanesque Villa listed as a contributing property in the district. The building is also part of the West Hollywood Courtyard Thematic District.

Notable figures who have lived in this building include Marilyn Monroe, Zsa Zsa Gabor, and Marlene Dietrich. The building was also the location of the infamous “triangle” between Marlene Dietrich and Rita and Josef Von Sternberg that eventually led to the Von Sternbergs's 1931 divorce.

== Architecture and design ==
Romanesque Villa Apartments is a three-story apartment complex situated above a partial subterranean parking garage. Rectangular in plan, the building is made of concrete and features a Spanish Colonial Revival design that includes:

- massing that is central, recessed, and flanked by wings
- a low pitched roof covered with terra cotta tile
- a large, square tower with an octagon turret on the building's northeast corner, the turret topped by terra cotta tile and a Spanish galleon weather vane
- deeply incised concrete work on the ground floor
- a flat arch framed by brackets at the entrance to the parking garage
- grillwork-covered openings that provide light to the garage
- a centered main entrance accessible through a small raised platform defined by a stone balustrade and a pair of piers flanking a wide cement stairway within a recessed bay
- arched entries and pairs of arched casement windows in aediculae of Churrigueresque ornament on the first and second floors
- circular and flat-headed casement windows on the first floor
- wrought iron and semi-circular stucco balconies that punctuate the second and third floors
- an arcaded loggia that articulates the attic level of the central portion of the building
- corner quoins and pierced stucco grilles that articulate the facade
- cornice visually strengthened by a deep corbel
