= Leland A. Bryant =

American architect

- Born: July 24, 1890; Santa Cruz, California
- Died: July 20, 1954 (aged 63); Beverly Hills, California
- Occupation: Architect
- Spouse: Virginia Scheere
- Buildings: Sunset Towers; The Fontenoy; Le Trianon Apartments; Afton Arms Apartments; Colonial House

Leland A. Bryant (1890–1954) was an architect who primarily worked in the Los Angeles area. During his short career that was ended by the Great Depression, he designed many large Châteauesque apartment buildings popular among celebrities such as Marilyn Monroe and John Wayne.

== Early life ==
Leland A. Bryant was born on July 24, 1890 in Santa Cruz, California. Leland's father, Arthur Bryant, was originally from Maine and had lived in Santa Cruz County since at least 1884, when he became a teacher in Soquel. In 1892, the Bryant family lived at 157 Laurel Street and in 1898 they lived at 99 Center Street, both in Santa Cruz.

The Bryants moved to San Francisco in 1904. It is possible Leland attended the University of California, Berkeley while living with his parents, possibly c. 1907-1911. From 1911 to 1913, Leland lived at 1247 9th Avenue in San Francisco.

== Architecture career ==
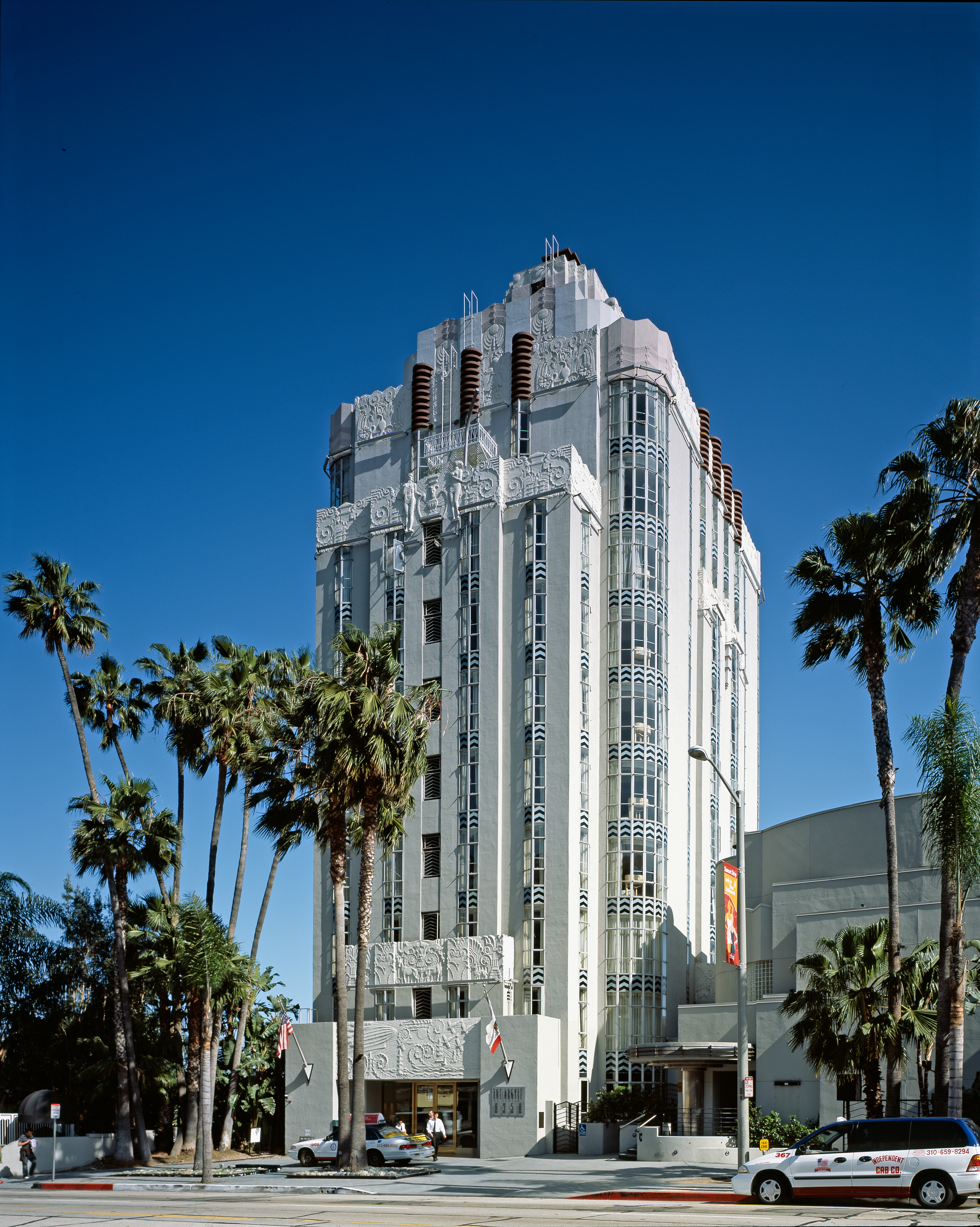
Sunset Tower

Between 1907 and 1918, Leland worked as a draughtsman at several San Francisco architecture firms, including hose of D.H. Burnham and Bakewell and Brown. He also worked twice in the office of Los Angeles architect G. Albert Lansburgh.

Leland began his career as a principal architect in 1918 in San Francisco and continued in Los Angeles in 1924. He partnered with Kenneth MacDonald in 1929.

While Leland is noted for working in all architectural styles, he focused on Chateauesque architecture and distinguished himself by designing finely detailed period revival apartment buildings, many of which were favorites of Los Angeles celebrities.

=== List of works ===
Leland's most notable works include:

==== Hollywood ====
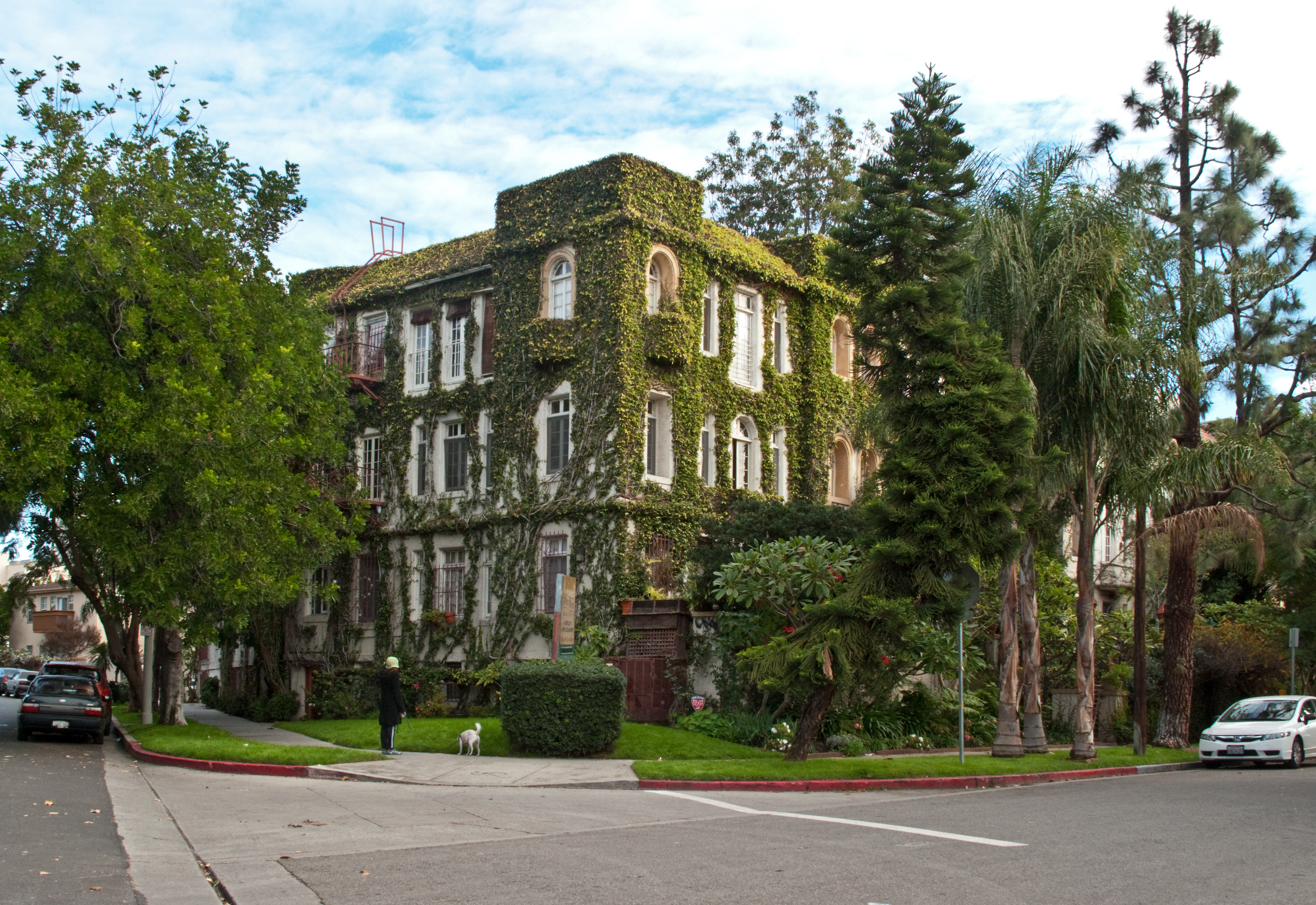
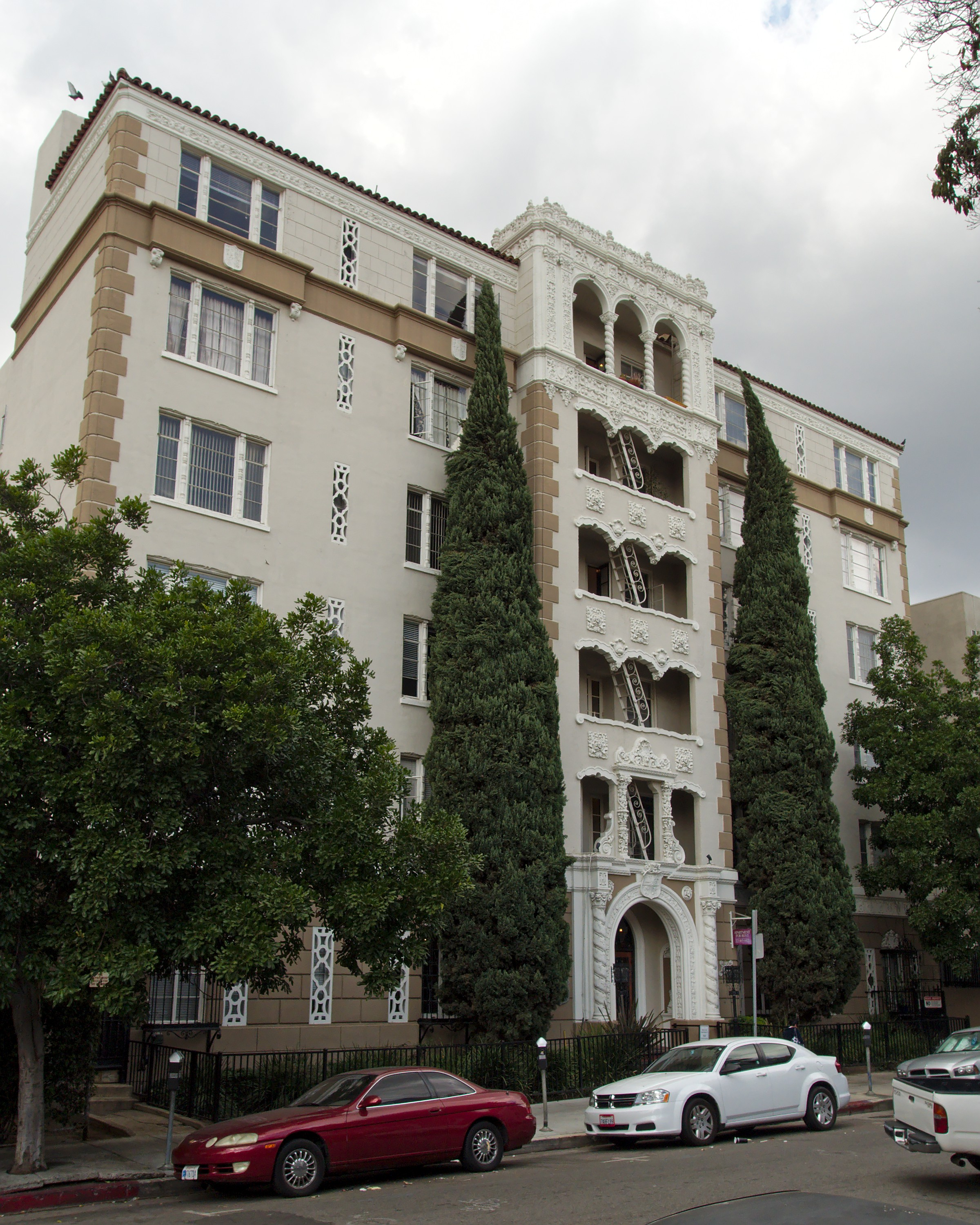
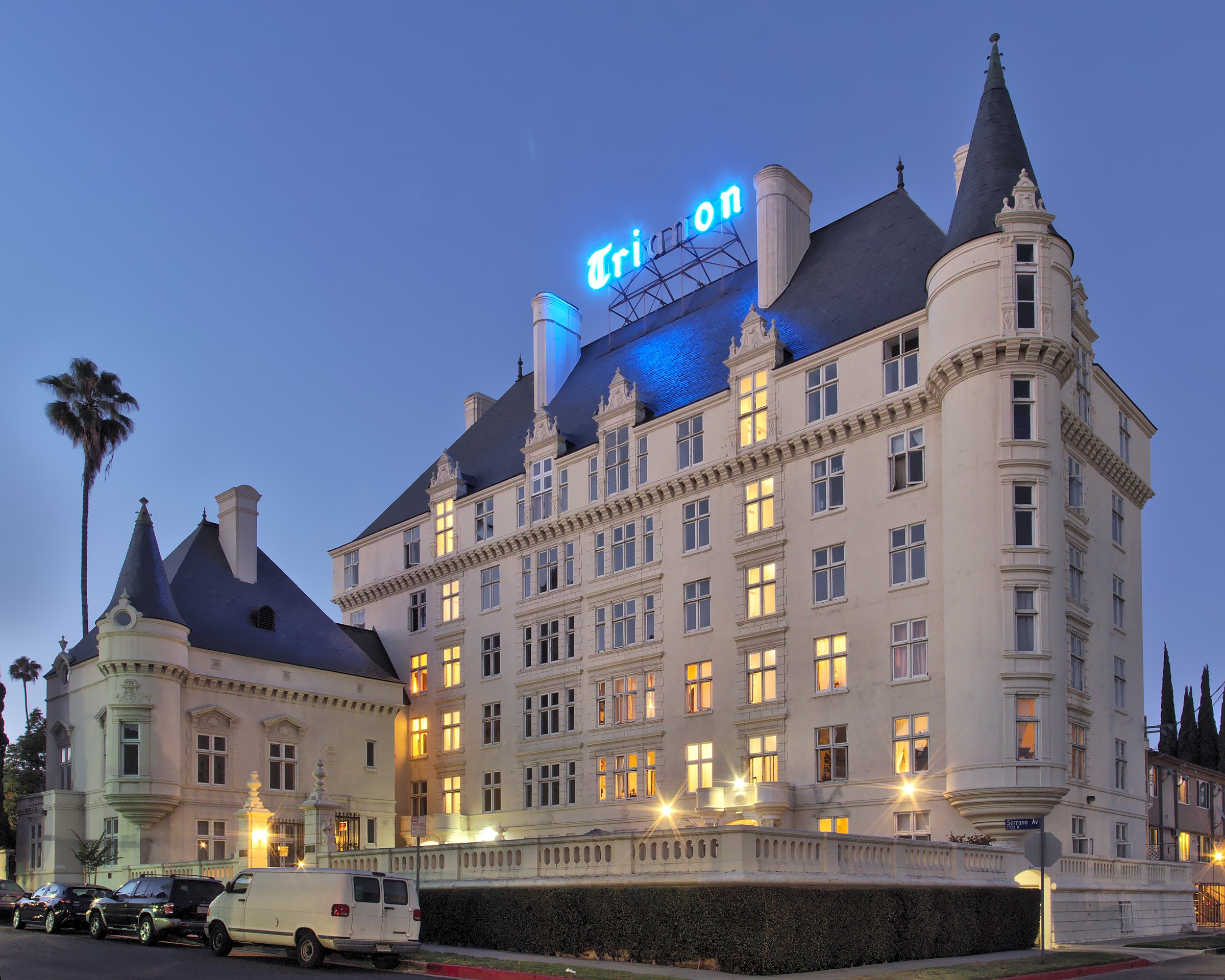
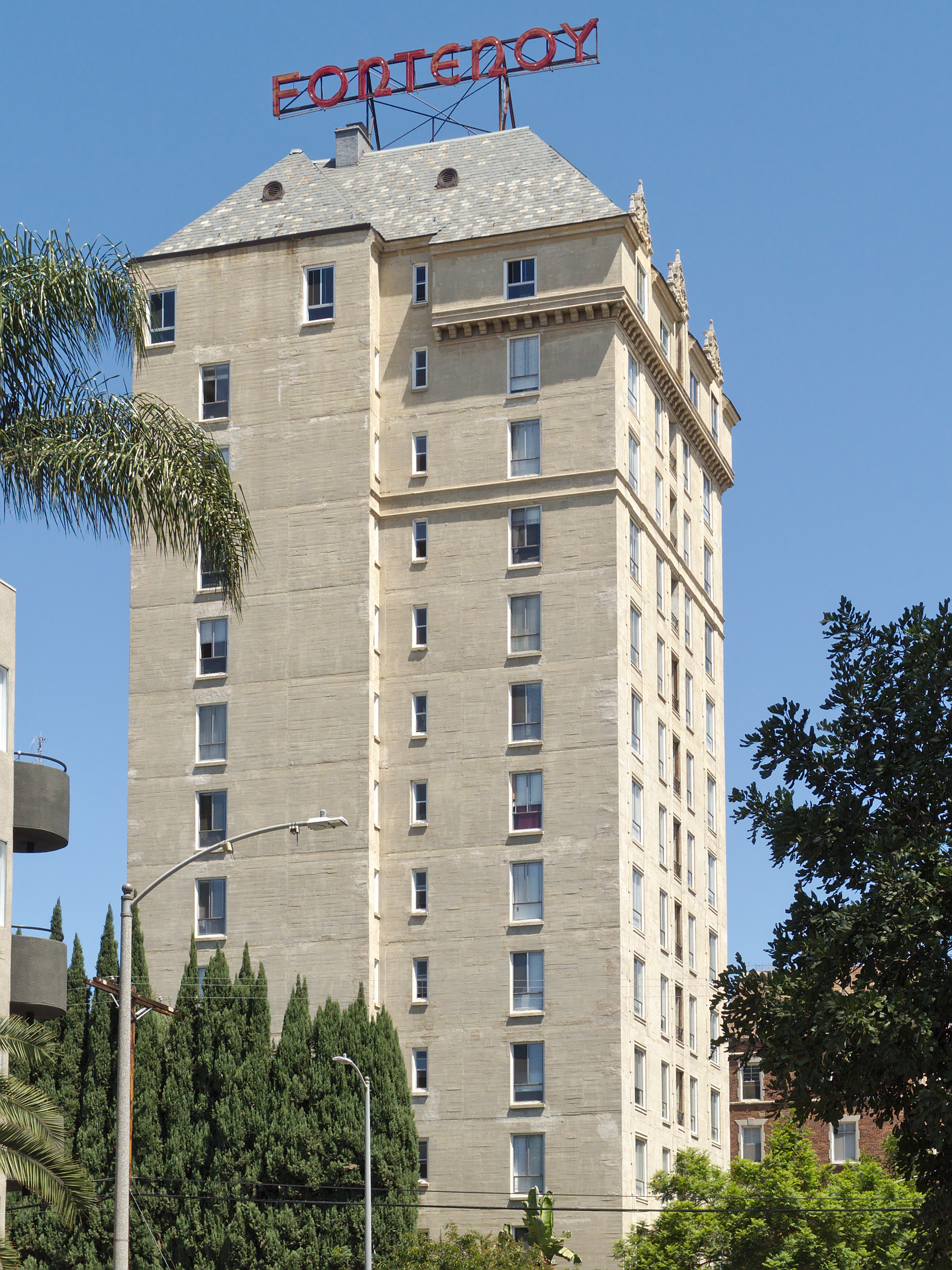
Los Angeles Historic-Cultural Monuments (clockwise from upper-left): Afton Arms Apartments, La Leyenda Apartments, The Fontenoy, Le Trianon Apartments
- Afton Arms Apartments (1924), LAHCM No. 463
- Apartment building at 1805 N. Wilcox Ave (1926)
- La Leyenda Apartments (1927), LAHCM No. 817
- Le Trianon Apartments (1928), LAHCM No. 616
- The Fontenoy (1929), LAHCM No. 882

==== West Hollywood ====
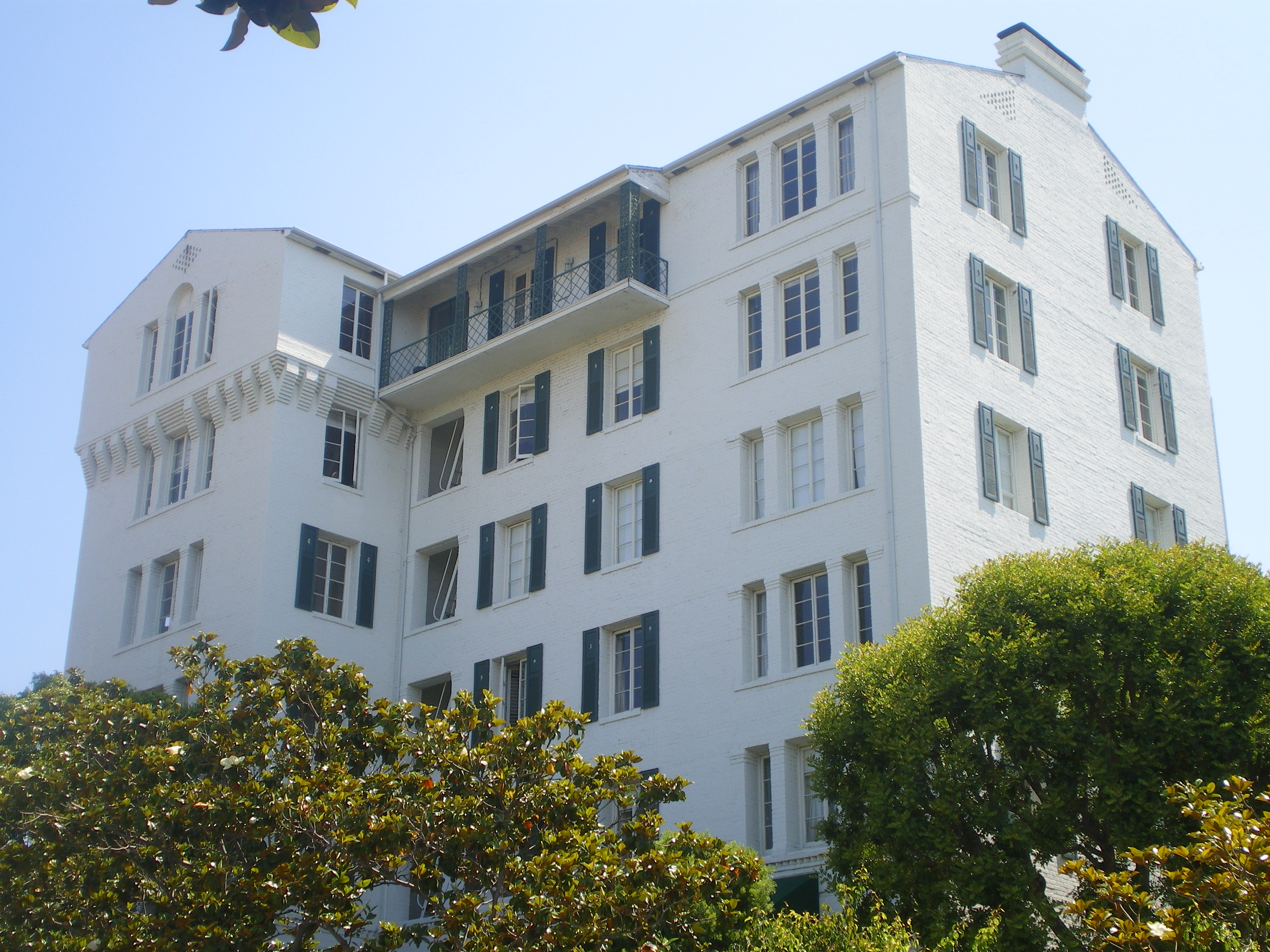
Colonial House

- Beau Sejour (c. 1920s)
- Les Maisonettes (1927), contributing property in the North Harper Avenue Historic District
- La Fontaine Building (1928)
- Voltaire Apartments (1928, 1929, or 1930)
- Romanesque Villa Apartments (1928), contributing property in the North Harper Avenue Historic District
- Sunset Tower (1929–1931), NRHP No. 80000812
- Colonial House (1930–1931), NRHP No. 82002190

==== Other ====
- Crystal Pier Beach Club, Santa Monica (1926)
- Country Club Manor Apartments, Hancock Park (1926)
- Park Lane Apartments, Koreatown (1927)

== Post architecture ==
In 1937, Leland worked as a building inspector for the city of Los Angeles. In 1942, he worked as a designer for Vega Aircraft Company.

In 1945, Leland became president and owner of the Geometric Mastering Corp., a company he established after inventing the Bryant tooling dock, which reduced the tooling time required for manufacturing in the aircraft, automobile, and railroad industries. Leland retired in 1950.

== Personal life and death ==
In 1912, Leland married Virginia Scheere, who herself was born on August 9, 1893 in Montana. Virginia's father, Charles H. Scheere worked as a printer in Helena, Montana and her mother, Hattie, raised two children: Virginia and her brother Fred. Leland and Virginia had two daughters together.

Leland and Virginia lived together in the San Francisco bay area from at least 1914 to late 1923 or early 1924, when they moved to Los Angeles. Leland then lived in either the city of Los Angeles or Beverly Hills for the rest of his years, and he died following a protracted illness in his Beverly Hills residence on July 20, 1954. Virginia died in Orange County, California on June 26, 1979.
