= Claíomh Solais (disambiguation) =

Claíomh Solais, translated in English as the "Sword of Light", is a sword that appears in Irish and Scottish mythology.

Claíomh Solais or Claidheamh Soluis may also refer to:

- An Claidheamh Soluis, an Irish newspaper by Conradh na Gaeilge (Gaelic League)
- An Claíomh Solais, 1998 novel by Liam Mac Cóil
- Claíomh Solais, also known as the Shiny Rod, a fictional staff used by Woodward, Shiny Chariot, and Atsuko Kagari in the Little Witch Academia franchise
