= Christopher Mudgett =

American painter

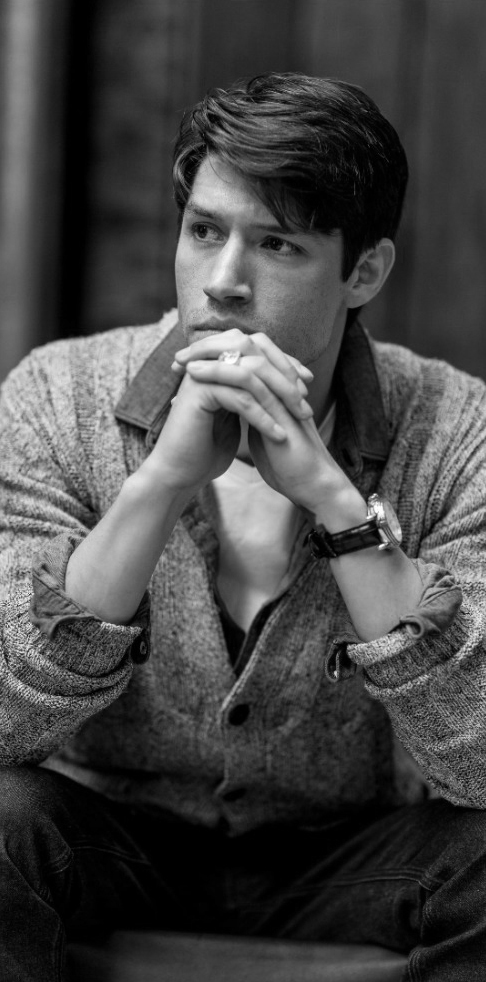
- Mudgett in Soho, NYC - 2016
- Born: Christopher Joseph Mudgett; December 14, 1982 (age 43); Sherman, Texas
- Education: Self-taught
- Known for: Painting, drawing, printmaking

Christopher Joseph Mudgett (born December 14, 1982) is an American artist known for his monochromatic artworks; primarily oil paintings, drawings, and sculptures.

He lives and works in the historic Whitley Heights district of Los Angeles.

== Exhibitions ==
Mudgett began exhibiting his work in 2012. After years of participating in group shows, solo exhibits and art fairs across the country, Mudgett left his gallery representation in favor of being able to take control of his artistic output and the way in which his work was presented.

In 2024 Mudgett announced his fourth solo exhibition in Los Angeles. "THE PISS" a collection of paintings created between 2020 and 2023 was curated by Gene Lemuel and presented by ESO bureau de recherches. The show was on view from March 21 - April 18, 2024.

== Collections ==
Christopher Mudgett's artwork is currently held in private collections around the world, including North & Central America, Great Britain, Singapore, Denmark, Spain, Germany, France, and China.
