= Fontenay =

Fontenay can refer to:

Persons

- Albert Fontenay, French diplomat who worked for Mary, Queen of Scots
- Charles L. Fontenay, journalist and science-fiction writer
- Élisabeth de Fontenay, French philosopher and essayist
- Jean-Baptiste Belin de Fontenay I, French painter
- Odette Le Fontenay (1885-1965), French singer

Battles

- Battle of Fontenay (841), during the Carolingian civil war
- Battle of Fontenay-le-Comte, in 1793, during the War in the Vendée

Fontenai and Fontenay is the name or part of the name of several communes in France:

- Fontenay, Eure, in the department of Eure
- Fontenay, Indre, in the department of Indre
- Fontenay, Manche, in the department of Manche
- Fontenay, Saône-et-Loire, in the department of Saône-et-Loire
- Fontenay, Seine-Maritime, in the department of Seine-Maritime
- Fontenay, Vosges, in the department of Vosges
- Fontenai-les-Louvets, in the department of Orne
- Fontenai-sur-Orne, in the department of Orne
- Fontenay-aux-Roses, in the department of Hauts-de-Seine
- Fontenay-de-Bossery, in the department of Aube
- Fontenay-en-Parisis, in the department of Val-d'Oise
- Fontenay-le-Comte, in the department of Vendée
- Fontenay-le-Fleury, in the department of Yvelines
- Fontenay-le-Marmion, in the department of Calvados
- Fontenay-le-Pesnel, in the department of Calvados
- Fontenay-lès-Briis, in the department of Essonne
- Fontenay-le-Vicomte, in the department of Essonne
- Fontenay-Mauvoisin, in the department of Yvelines
- Fontenay-près-Chablis, in the department of Yonne
- Fontenay-près-Vézelay, in the department of Yonne
- Fontenay-Saint-Père, in the department of Yvelines
- Fontenay-sous-Bois, in the department of Val-de-Marne
- Fontenay-sous-Fouronnes, in the department of Yonne
- Fontenay-sur-Conie, in the department of Eure-et-Loir
- Fontenay-sur-Eure, in the department of Eure-et-Loir
- Fontenay-sur-Loing, in the department of Loiret
- Fontenay-sur-Mer, in the department of Manche
- Fontenay-sur-Vègre, in the department of Sarthe
- Fontenay-Torcy, in the department of Oise
- Fontenay-Trésigny, in the department of Seine-et-Marne

Other

- Abbey of Fontenay, in Burgundy, France
- Côte de Fontenay, a premier cru vineyard in Chablis
- The Fontenay, a luxury hotel in Hamburg, Germany, opened in March 2018

== See also ==
- Fontenoy (disambiguation)
