= Colonial House (West Hollywood, California) =

Historic apartment building in West Hollywood, California

- U.S. National Register of Historic Places
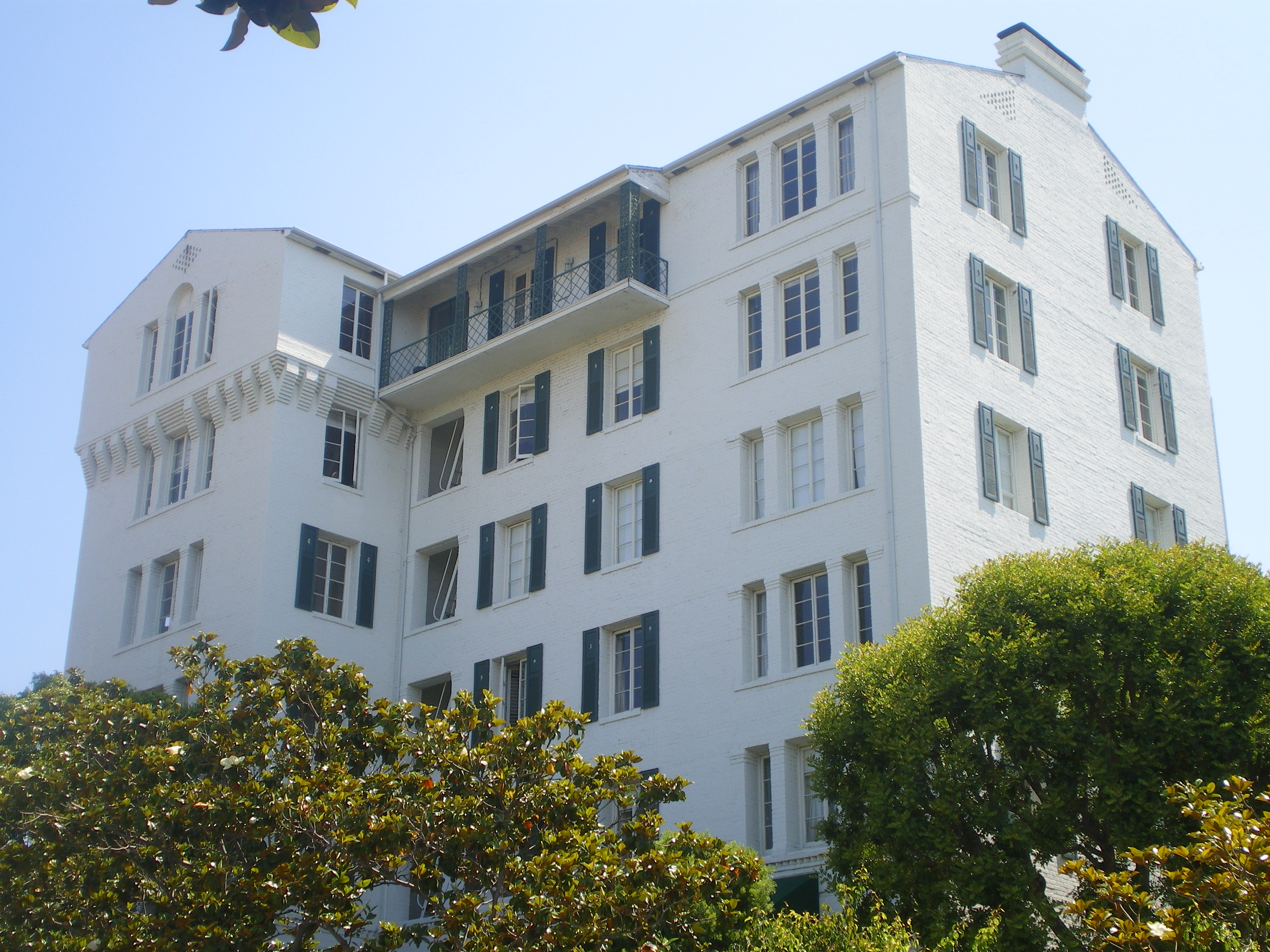
- Colonial House in 2008

- Location within the Los Angeles metropolitan area
- Location: 1416 N. Havenhurst Drive, West Hollywood, California
- Coordinates: 34.09657°N 118.36720°W
- Area: 0.5 acres (0.20 ha)
- Built: 1930
- Architectural style: Colonial Revival, French Colonial
- NRHP reference No.: 82002190
- Added to NRHP: April 15, 1982

Colonial House is a historic seven-story building in West Hollywood, California, U.S. It was built in 1930, and it was designed by architect Leland A. Bryant. It has been listed on the National Register of Historic Places since April 15, 1982.

== Description ==
The architectural style is French colonial and was built on an 80-by-190-foot (24 by 58 m) lot south of Sunset Boulevard.

The Colonial House has long been a home to celebrities. Some early Hollywood residents have included Jamie Lee Curtis, Carol Kane, Bette Davis, Cary Grant, Clark Gable, Carole Lombard, Myrna Loy, Eddie Cantor, William Powell, Norma Talmadge, and Joan Blondell. In recent years, pop singer Katy Perry purchased a residence in the building as well.

== See also ==
- Château Élysée
