= Alfredo De La Vega =

Alfredo De La Vega (born 1911–1912 in Los Angeles, died September 24, 1987, in West Hollywood, California) was a wealthy businessman, real estate manager and frequent host of Hollywood celebrities.

De La Vega was born in Hancock Park, the son of a prominent Mexican family that socialized with many motion picture stars.

De La Vega began his career in the insurance industry, where he worked for many years. He later owned a number of large apartment buildings that he ran through his own company.

Residing in one of them, the La Fontaine Building at Crescent Heights and Fountain in West Hollywood, De La Vega was known in social circles for his extravagant dinner parties in his apartment there. At age 75, De La Vega was killed there while an assistant listened via intercom from the building's basement office of De La Vega Management Company. Police reported that he had been shot at least twice in the abdomen and that a small revolver was found near the body.

According to TV sleuth Dominick Dunne, who knew De La Vega and was familiar with the scene of his death, the death was a homicide.
