= John Selwyn Lloyd =

Welsh author (1931–2023)

J. Selwyn Lloyd
- Born: John Selwyn Lloyd; 1931
- Died: 22 March 2023 (aged 91–92)
- Occupation: Author
- Writing career
- Pen name: J. Selwyn Lloyd

John Selwyn Lloyd (1931 – 22 March 2023), known professionally as J. Selwyn Lloyd, was a Welsh-language author of novels for children and young adults.

== Biography ==
Lloyd was born in Talysarn in the Nantlle Valley, a heavily Welsh-speaking area of North Wales.

Lloyd lived in Corwen. He died at a residential home in Caernarfon on 22 March 2023.

== Awards ==
- Tir na n-Og Award in 1977 and 1983
- Tlws y Ddrama at the National Eisteddfod of Wales in 1979 for Ychydig wedi naw.
- Mary Vaughan Jones Award in 2000

== Bibliography ==
- Owi Tŷ Pella (Hughes, 1960)
- Llam y Lleidr (Hughes, 1967)
- Creithiau'r gorffennol (Gwasg Gomer, 1972)
- Dychweliad y swastika (D. Brown a'i Feibion, 1973)
- Breuddwyd yw ddoe (Gwasg Gomer, 1976)
- Llygad y ddrycin (Gwasg Gwynedd, 1976)
- Trysor Bryniau Caspar (Gwasg Gomer, 1976)
- Esgyrn sychion (Gwasg Gomer, 1977)
- Ychydig wedi naw (Cyngor Gwasanaethau Gwirfoddol Clwyd, 1979)
- Llygad y daran (Gwasg Gomer, 1980)
- Brenin y paith (Gwasg Gomer, 1982)
- Croes bren yn Norwy (Gwasg Gomer, 1982; 2nd ed. 1986)
- Y Saethau duon (Gwasg Gomer 1982)
- Trwy awyr wenfflam (Gwasg Gomer, 1982)
- Wrth draed y meirw (Gwag Gomer, 1982)
- Cysgod rhyfel (Gwasg Gomer, 1983)
- Gwaed ar y dagrau (Gwasg Gomer, 1983; 2nd ed. 1988)
- Saethau ar y paith (Gwasg Gomer, 1983; 2nd ed. 1988)
- Bu farw Mel Polanski (Gwasg Gomer, 1984)
- Y Dylluan wen (Urdd Gobaith Cymru 1984)
- Y Seren Arian (Urdd Gobaith Cymru 1987)
- Trysor yn y Fynwent (Gwasg Gomer, 1988; 2nd ed. 1992)
- Elain (Gwasg Pantycelyn, 1993)
- Y Dyn a'r Groes o Haearn (Gwasg Gwynedd, 1995)
- Cai Jones ac Esgyrn y Diafol (Gwasg Gwynedd, 1989)
- Cai Jones a'r Awyren Goll (Gwasg Gwynedd, 1991)
- Cai Jones a'r Elain Wen (Gwasg Gwynedd, 1994)
- Mudan Porth y Ddraig (Gwasg Gomer, 1991)

== Translations ==
- Saibhreas Chnoic Chaspair (Irish translation of Trysor Bryniau Caspar by Liam Mac Cóil, Oifig an tSoláthair, 1981)
- The Mute horseman of Dragon's Bay (English translation of Mudan Porth y Ddraig by the author, Pont, 1992)
