= Liam Mac Cóil =

Irish writer (born 1952)

Liam Mac Cóil is an Irish language novelist, a critic, and an essayist.

== Career ==
Born in Dublin in 1952, Liam Mac Cóil lives in the Gaeltacht of Ráth Cairn, County Meath. Before becoming a full-time writer he worked for a time at An Coiste Téarmaíochta. He is presently co-editor of the literary annual Bliainiris and director of the publishing house Carbad. He has written six novels as well as a writer's journal, Nótaí ón Lár (Notes from the Centre).

Early in his career, he published two translations from the Welsh, Tiocfaidh Lá (original title: Daw Dydd, a selection of writings by Welsh-language activist Ffred Ffransis) and Saibhreas Chnoic Chaspair (Trysor Bryniau Caspar, a young-adult novel by John Selwyn Lloyd). In 2010 he published a work of personal reflections on the composer Charles Villiers Stanford titled An Chláirseach agus an Choróin. His work has also appeared in the publications Comhar, Feasta and Aimsir Óg.

== Awards and nominations ==
Mac Cóil's debut novel, An Dochtúir Áthas, was shortlisted for the Irish Times Literature Prize for Fiction in 1995, becoming the first Irish-language novel to be so recognised. His third novel, Fontenoy, won the Gradam Uí Shúilleabháin (an annual prize for Irish-language books) in 2006.

== Published novels ==
- An Dochtúir Áthas (Doctor Joy), Leabhar Breac, 1995
- An Claíomh Solais (The Sword of Light), Leabhar Breac, 1998
- Fontenoy, Leabhar Breac, 2005
- An Litir (The Letter), Leabhar Breac, 2012
- I dTír Stráinséartha (In a Strange Land), Leabhar Breac, 2014
- An Choill (The Wood), Leabhar Breac, 2016.
- Bealach na Spáinneach (The Spanish Way) Leabhar Breac, 2020

== Other published work ==
- Tiocfaidh Lá, Carbad, 1977 (translation of Daw Dydd by Ffred Ffransis)
- The Book of Blackrock, Carraig Books, 1977
- Saibhreas Chnoic Chaspair, An Gúm, 1981 (translation of Trysor Bryniau Caspar by J. Selwyn Lloyd)
- Toirealach Ó Cearúlláin, Leabhar Breac, 1999
- Nótaí ón Lár, Leabhar Breac, 2000
- Bliainiris, Carbad, 2000 -2007
