= La Fontaine Building =

Historic building in West Hollywood, California

La Fontaine
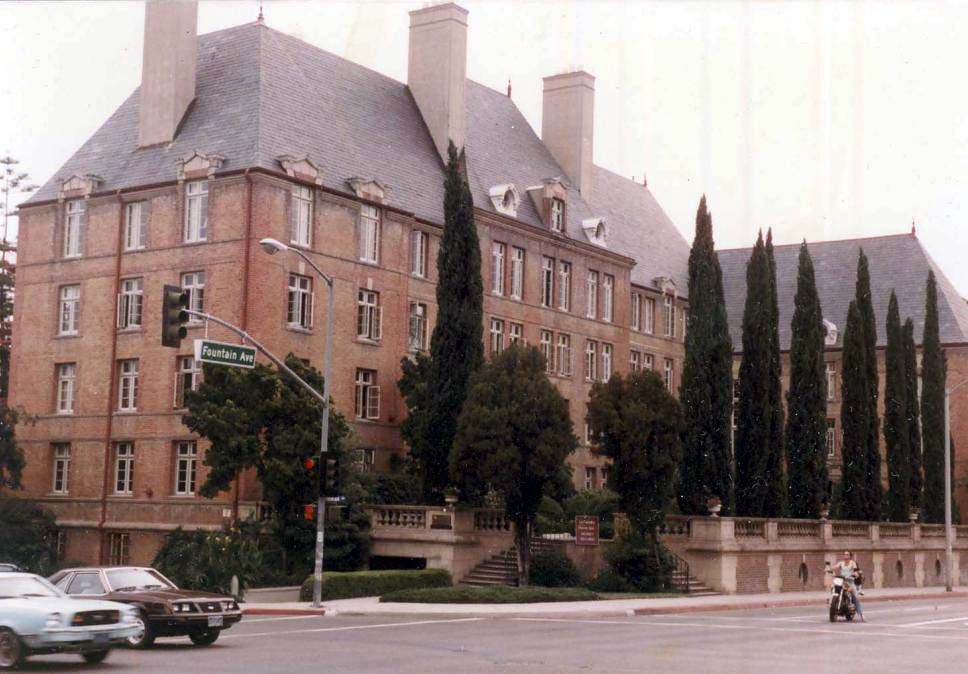
- The building in 1982

General information
- Architectural style: French Revival
- Location: 1283-1289 North Crescent Heights Boulevard, West Hollywood, California
- Coordinates: 34.0943°N 118.3664°W
- Year built: 1928

Technical details
- Floor count: 4

Design and construction
- Architect: Leland Bryant

La Fontaine, also known as La Fontaine Apartments, is a historic four-story apartment complex located at 1283-1289 North Crescent Heights Boulevard, on the corner of Crescent Heights Boulevard and Fountain Avenue, in West Hollywood, California.

== History ==
La Fontaine was designed by Leland Bryant, the architect also responsible for the nearby Voltaire Apartments and Sunset Towers, and built in 1928.

Notable figures who've lived at La Fontaine include Dane Cook, Bette Midler, Steve Martin, and owner Alfredo De La Vega. De La Vega was shot and killed in his apartment there in 1987.

The building was designated a West Hollywood Cultural Resource in 2016.

== Architecture and design ==
La Fontaine is L-shaped, made of brick, four-stories in height, and features a French Revival design that includes finials, apertures decorated with gabled-pediments, dormers, casement windows, denticulated cornice, and a steep pitched slate roof punctuated with chimneys. The building also features a landscaped court lined with balustrade atop its mostly subterranean parking garage.
