= Whitley Heights, Los Angeles =

- Whitley Heights Historic District
- U.S. National Register of Historic Places
- U.S. Historic district
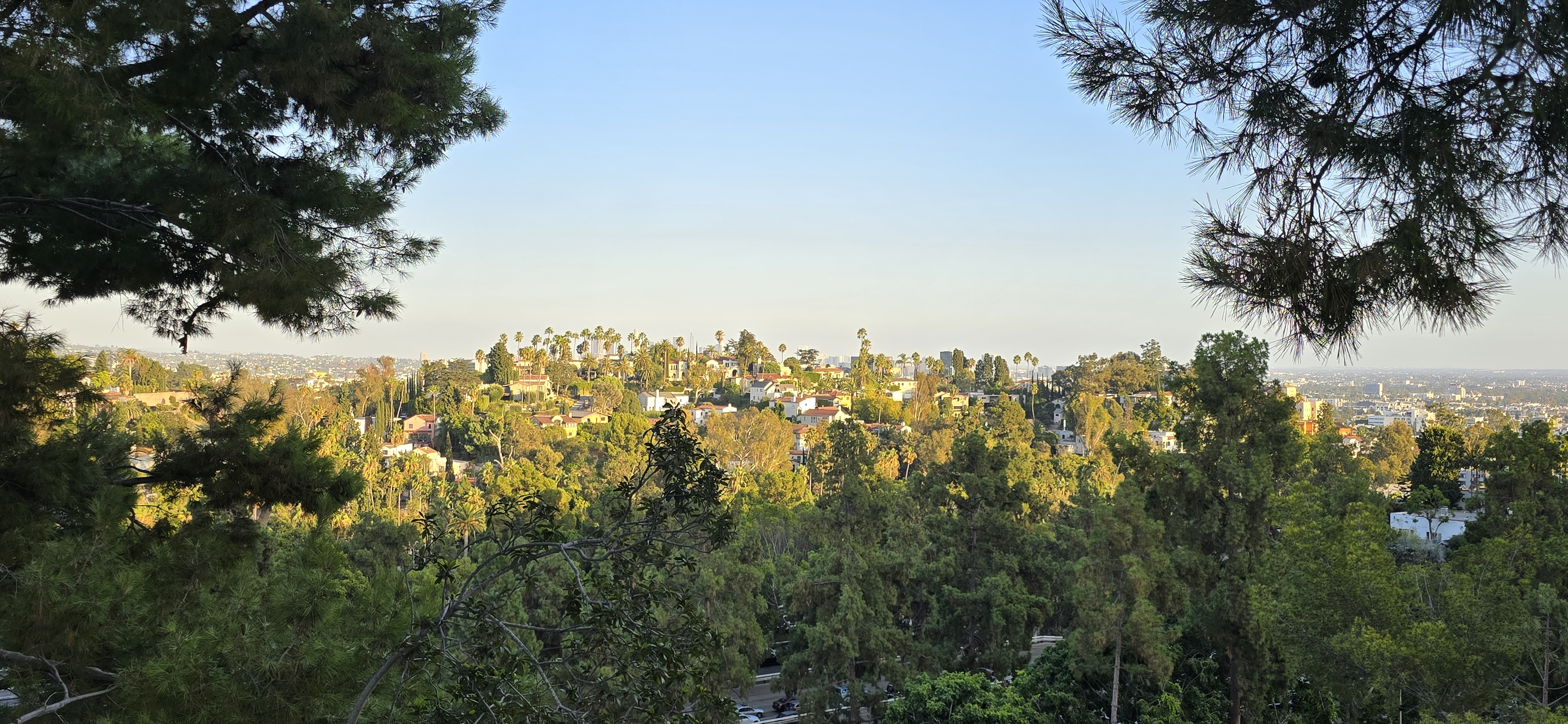
- Whitley Heights sits on a hill, here visible from the Hollywood Bowl.

- Location within Los Angeles
- Location: Hollywood, Los Angeles, California
- Coordinates: 34°6′27″N 118°20′3″W
- Architect: Barnes, A.S.; et al.
- Architectural style: Mediterranean Revival, Spanish Colonial Revival, American Craftsman
- NRHP reference No.: 82002189
- Added to NRHP: August 19, 1982

Whitley Heights is a residential neighborhood and historic preservation overlay zone in the Hollywood Hills neighborhood of Central Los Angeles, California. Known as a residential area for actors and other people in the motion-picture industry, it is divided between a hillside single-family district and an apartment area. It is notable for an attempt by its homeowners' group and the city to close off public streets to outside traffic, an effort that was ruled illegal by the courts.

== Geography ==
The preservation zone is split into two parts by the Hollywood Freeway (U.S. Highway 101) running through the Cahuenga Pass. Streets within the zone's northern part are a one-block portion of Cahuenga Boulevard, Iris Drive, and some of Whitley Avenue; it consists almost exclusively of multi-family apartment buildings. The southern zone, about 80% of the original plot, embraces Fairfield Avenue, Wedgewood Place, Whitley Avenue, Cerritos Place, Hollyhill Terrace, Grace Avenue, Emmet Terrace, Las Palmas Avenue, and Milner Road, and is almost exclusively zoned for single-family homes. It is within walking distance of the Hollywood Bowl, and Hollywood Boulevard is nearby.

== History ==
=== Early days ===
Hobart J. Whitley bought the hillside area in 1901 and 1903, and hired architect Arthur Barnes to build houses in a Mediterranean style he thought would suit Southern California's climate. Five years later, Whitley Heights was seen as a "magnificent hill of forty acres situated in the very center of Hollywood and overlooking the entire city."

On June 30, 1907, a fire kindled by a resident at the foot of the hill swept over the land, which was covered by a heavy growth of wild mustard and barley, and destroyed "many rare and valuable trees and shrubs" Whitley had planted. It threatened a large reservoir owned by the United Hollywood Water Company atop the rise and burned several tons of hay. The fire was quenched the same day by the volunteer Hollywood fire department headed by E. Fossler.

As a contemporary account noted, "This hill has been one of the show places of Hollywood for some time. Here. Mr. Whitley intends erecting a handsome home at some future date, and toward this end, he has cultivated and beautified the grounds, laying them out in winding roads and planting a great variety of rare trees and shrubs, some of which were imported from the Hawaiian Islands and Mexico."

Whitley had sold some of his land for one dollar to the water company for the reservoir about 1904 and bought it back 16 years later at a cost of $30,000. In 1918, Whitley commissioned architect A.S. Barnes to design Whitley Heights as a Mediterranean village on the steep hillsides above Hollywood Boulevard. Whitley sent Barnes to tour the Mediterranean area to study its architecture and landscaping of Italy's historic hill towns before returning to the Southland, where he designed most of the Whitley Heights houses between 1918 and 1928. The development grew during the 1920s, and it became the first Hollywood celebrity community. The streets in the development were dedicated to public use in 1920 and 1921, and they were improved by the city between 1924 and 1927. Most of them had no sidewalks, with stairways built from level to level to encourage walking.

On the evening of June 23, 1920, the residential subdivision of Whitley Heights was opened with a festive barbecue that gathered an assemblage of businessmen and politicians. "The occasion was attended with a special significance as it was the scene of a reunion of many men who were connected with Mr. Whitley in his first efforts to make the vegetable gardens into a wealthy city more than twenty years ago, men who had gathered at a similar affair in 1902 to watch the turning on of the first electric lights in Hollywood," wrote The Times. The subdivision already had several homes on the terraces that divided the hill into four grades. Three years later, in 1923, the Whitley Heights Civic Association was founded.

=== Preservation zone ===
The hill's narrow, winding streets, paved in 1926, connected by flights of pedestrian stairs and supported by retaining walls, still serve the community . . . Electrical lines and utilities placed in underground conduits, another novel concept for the times, as well as the original street lamps, function as they did in the late 1920s.

— Los Angeles Times

In 1982, Whitley Heights was made a state historic district by the California Historical Resources Commission after research done by actor Brian Moore, president of Whitley Heights Homeowners. Moore traced property titles in the area, gathered old photographs and articles, and read through the papers of Hobart J. Whitley, which were housed in the special collections library at the University of California, Los Angeles.

He was impelled to begin his research in 1981 after a bungalow was demolished by a developer who wanted to build tract homes. To qualify for the designation, an area had to be at least 50 years old and retain many of its original characteristics. At the time almost all of the homes, with their red tile roofs, balconies, and arched windows and doorways, were original. Later, the district was also made a national historic place, the first such in Hollywood. In 2004, the area was made into a Los Angeles historic preservation overlay zone.

=== Street closure ===
Over time, the placid nature of Whitley Heights and its 168 homes changed. In April 1983, the Whitley Heights Civic Association was incensed at a developer's plans to build an apartment complex on Las Palmas Avenue, which stirred up a community surge on behalf of fencing off streets around the neighborhood as protection against what one resident called "animal people" who walked up the hill to burglarize homes.

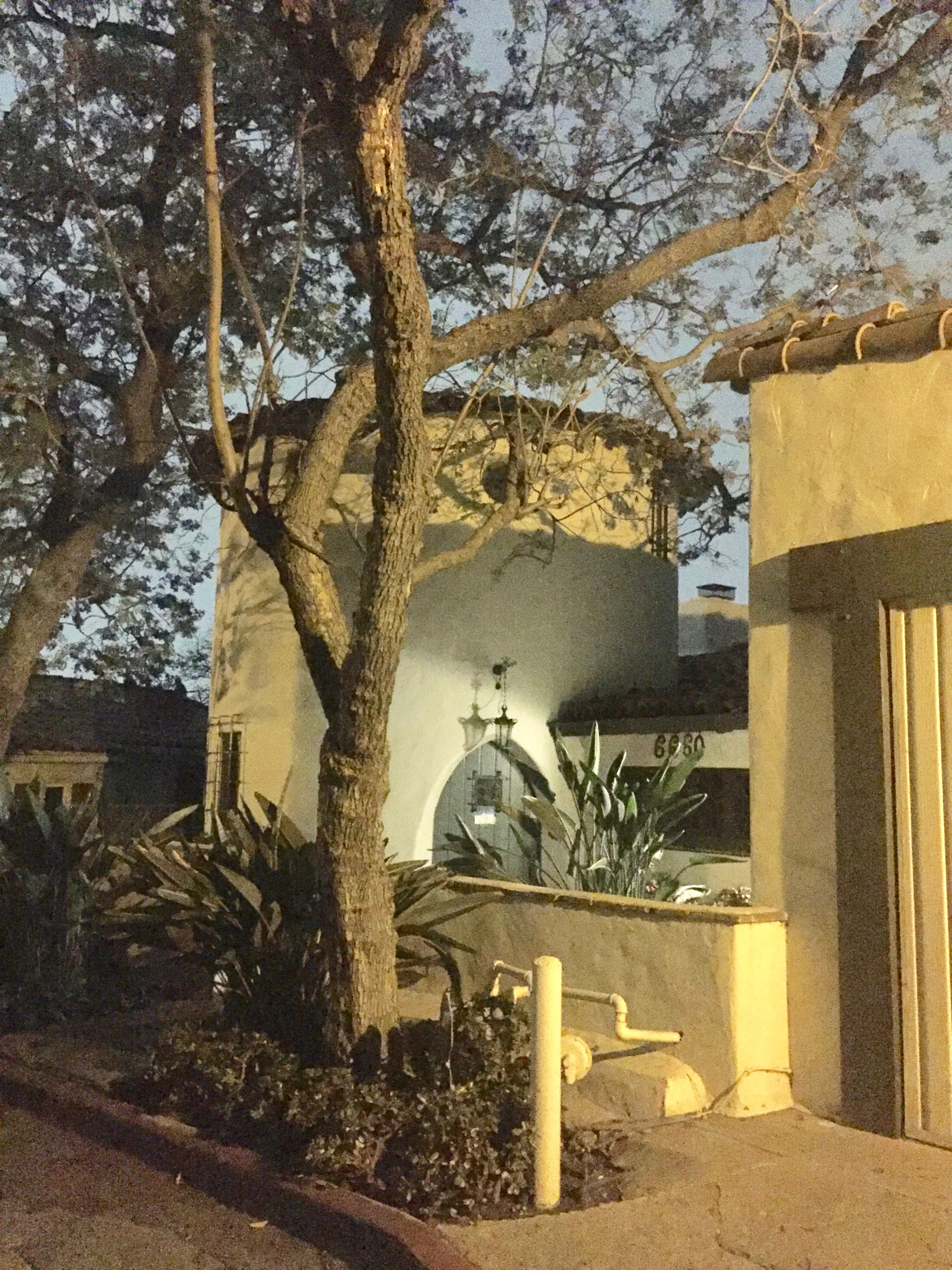
Spanish Colonial Revival house in the Whitley neighborhood

By 1985, there were burglaries, assaults, vandalism, and car thefts. Prostitutes came up from nearby Hollywood Boulevard to work in parked cars, and the area extending north from Hollywood Boulevard into Whitley Heights had the highest crime rate in Hollywood. For four years, residents had been beseeching the city to approve the installation of 10 gates across the public streets leading into the community, and in May 1985, the Public Works Committee of the City Council agreed with the area's city council representative, Peggy Stevenson, and recommended that streets to the enclave be closed to non-residents.

In 1991, the city issued a permit to the Whitley Heights Civic Association to allow the installation of gates that would turn the community into a private enclave. Construction, funded by Whitley Heights homeowners, began in January 1991 and was substantially completed by April 1992, at a cost of more than $350,000.

Construction was permanently halted in 1992 when a group called Citizens Against Gated Enclaves successfully sued to prevent the closure of public roadways in Whitley Heights. The trial court held that state law prohibited the city from withdrawing a street from public use in that fashion. An appellate court agreed, and the result was that the gates were removed at the expense of the Whitley Heights homeowners and the streets put back in good repair at the expense of the city, with all court costs paid by the defendants.

== Notable residences ==
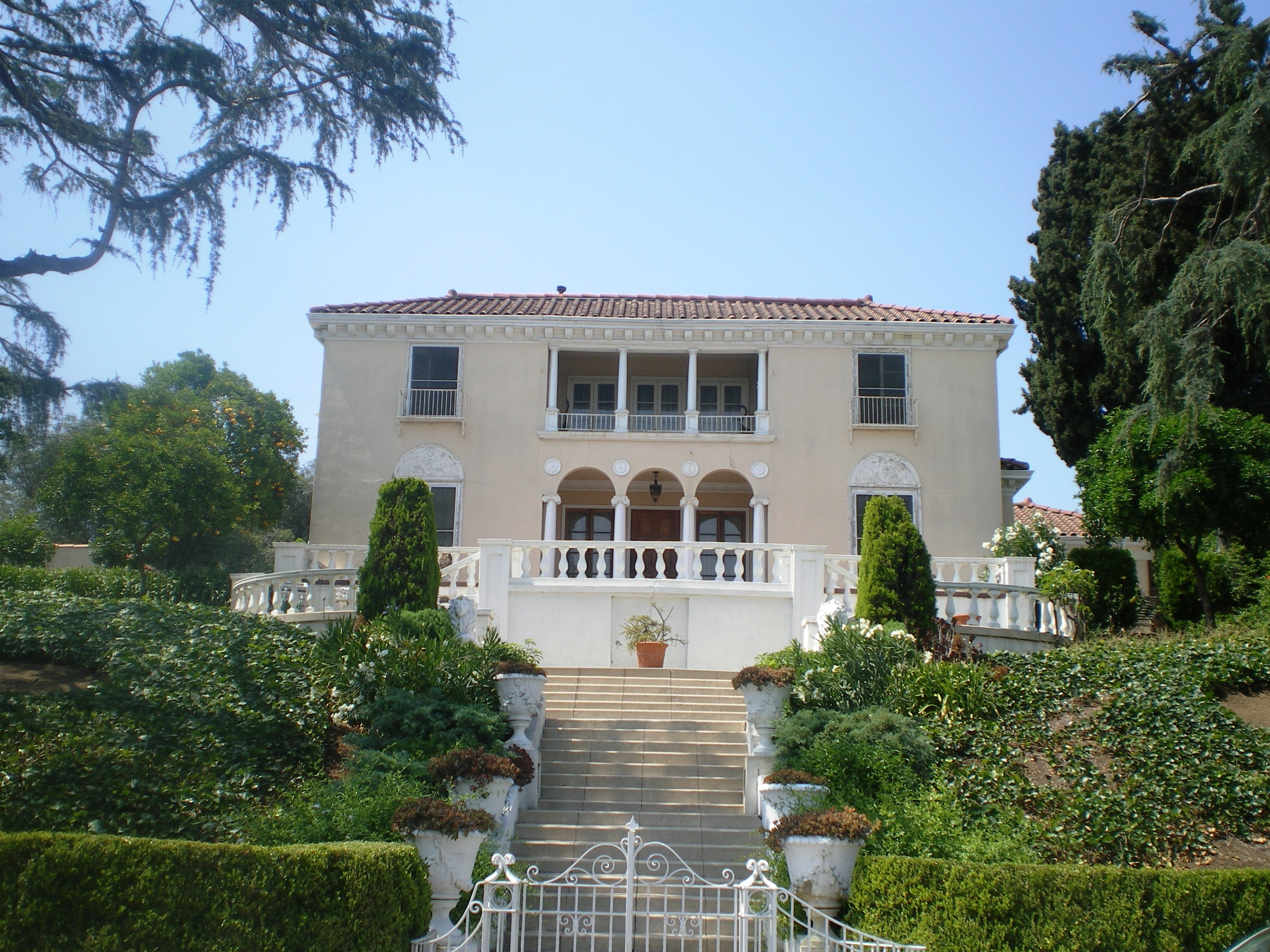
H.J. Whitley House, 6600 block of Whitley Terrace

Construction of the Hollywood Freeway through the district resulted in the destruction of 49 houses, including those where actors Rudolph Valentino and Charlie Chaplin had lived. A home belonging to actress Bette Davis was destroyed in the early 1960s for a proposed Hollywood museum that was never built.

- Villa Vallombrosa is a three-story residence built in 1929 by Eleanor DeWitt, who was described by Los Angeles Times columnist Jack Smith as a "wealthy and fastidious widow." Smith wrote: "Like most of the houses in Whitley Heights, it is … a collection of rooms and courtyards of various shapes and levels, fitted to the steep hillside." The architect was Nathaniel Coleman, who had been sent abroad to study Italian architecture and who modeled the house after a villa on the Grand Canal in Venice. In its three stories it had a "concave facade, a five-sided filigreed balcony and an interior courtyard with a fireplace and fountain.
- The home of actors Patrick Bauchau and Mijanou Bardot was featured in a 2003 book, Secret Gardens of Hollywood and Private Oases in Los Angeles, in which author Erica Lennard wrote, "Their yard, abundant with fruit trees — olive, lemon, pomegranate, guava, fig — and bamboo, jasmine, lavender, passionflowers, was too seductive to leave." In 1999, Bauchau had run afoul of the wishes of a local Historical Preservation Zone review board, which ordered him to cut back the overgrown foliage at the front of his property because it was shrouding the view of his house and the look was not in keeping with the original atmosphere of Whitley Heights from the 1920s.
- La Leyenda Apartments, a six-story apartment complex built in 1927. Designated a Los Angeles Historic-Cultural Monument in 2005.

== Notable residents ==
Actors and entertainers

- Mijanou Bardot
- Richard Barthelmess
- Patrick Bauchau
- Betty Blythe
- Beulah Bondi
- Louise Brooks
- Francis X. Bushman
- Leo G. Carroll
- Charlie Chaplin
- Maurice Chevalier
- Vance Colvig
- Bette Davis
- Marlene Dietrich
- Marie Dressler
- Dick Foran,
- W.C. Fields
- Judy Garland
- Janet Gaynor
- Lillian Gish
- Jack Haley
- Paul Kelly
- Barbara La Marr
- John Larch
- Harold Lloyd
- Carole Lombard
- Carmen Miranda
- Chester Morris
- Phillip Noyce
- Eugene O'Brien
- Donald O'Connor
- Ellen Pompeo
- William Powell
- Tyrone Power
- Ronald Reagan
- Rosalind Russell
- Barbara Stanwyck
- Gloria Swanson
- Blanche Sweet
- Lyle Talbot
- Rudolph Valentino
- Robert G. Vignola

Others

- William Faulkner, writer
- Dorothy MacKaye, writer

== See also ==
- List of Los Angeles Historic-Cultural Monuments in Hollywood
- List of Registered Historic Places in Los Angeles
