= The Fontenoy =

Historic building in Hollywood, California

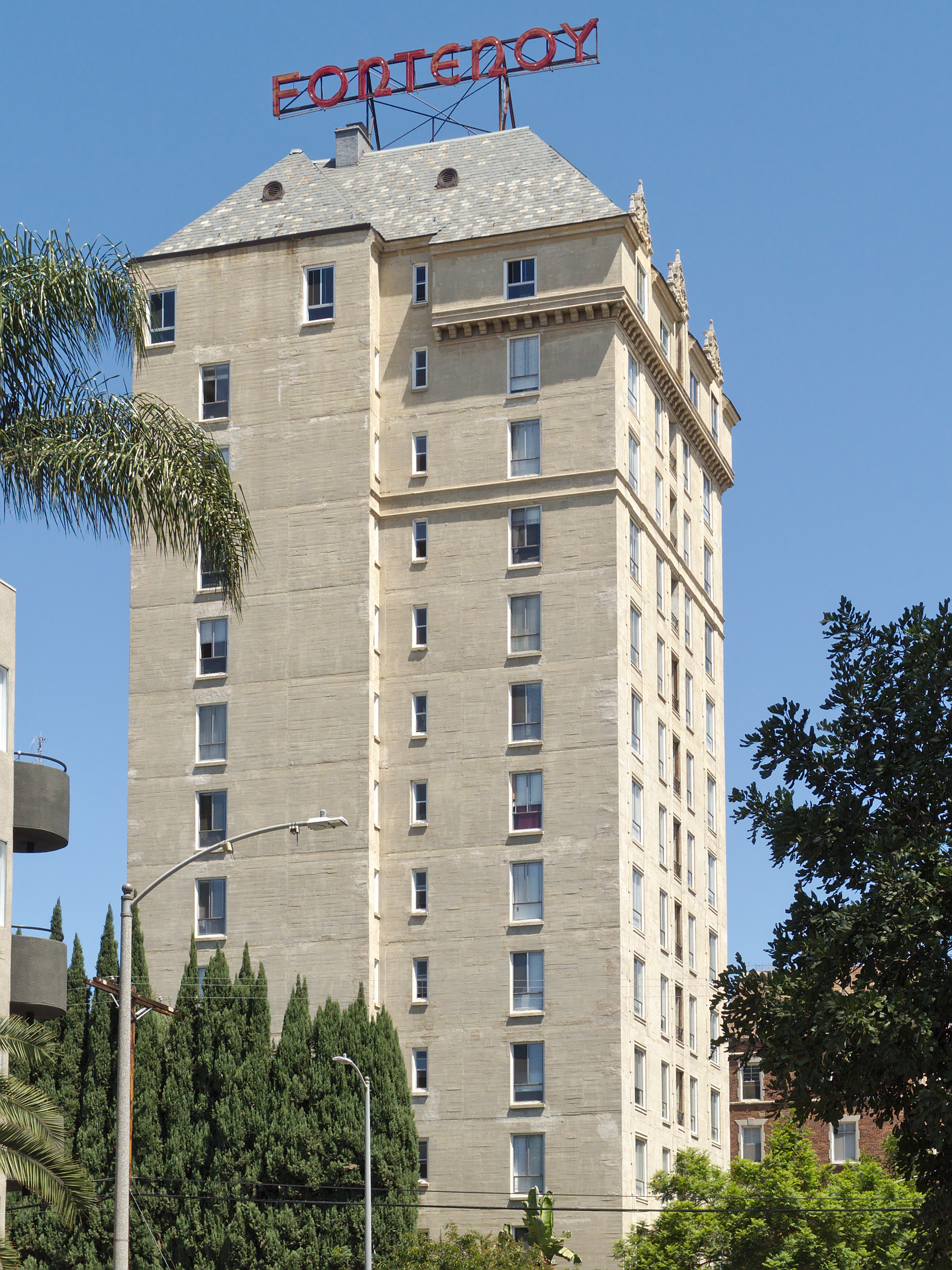
- The building in 2015
- Interactive map of the The Fontenoy area

General information
- Location: 1811 North Whitley Avenue, Hollywood, California
- Coordinates: 34.10367°N 118.33364°W
- Year built: 1929

Technical details
- Floor count: 14

Design and construction
- Architect: Leland Bryant

Los Angeles Historic-Cultural Monument
- Designated: July 25, 2007
- Reference no.: 882

The Fontenoy, also known as Chelsea Hotel-West, is a historic fourteen-story apartment complex located at 1811 North Whitley Avenue in Hollywood, California in Hollywood, California.

== History ==
The Fontenoy was designed by Leland Bryant, the architect also responsible for the nearby Le Trianon Apartments and Sunset Towers, and built in 1929. The building was bought by Calancorporation from Louis Mortimer in 1931.

The Fontenoy was designated Los Angeles Historic Cultural Monument No. 882 on July 25, 2007. The building was a functioning apartment complex with no vacancies at the time of its nomination.

Notable figures who've lived in The Fontenoy include Crispin Glover, Nicolas Cage, and Johnny Depp.

== Architecture and design ==
The Fontenoy is square in plan and was built of brick with concrete and brick cladding. It features a Chateauesque design that includes an arched and centered entrance with lattice windows and decorative molding. The roof is hipped, dutch-style gable shaped, made of slate tile, and features a roof ridge with a neon sign atop it. The building windows are made of steel.

Inside, the building's entry lobby features rope ornate plaster work, trim, and marble flooring. Each floor contains four units (one per corner) or less on the higher floors, for a total of fifty units in the building.

The building also contains a subterrenean parking garage and a yard with an oval-shaped pool.
