= An Claíomh Solais =

Novel by Liam Mac Cóil

Irish language novelist Liam Mac Cóil's second novel, An Claíomh Solais, is set in the Co. Meath Gaeltacht of Ráth Cairn.

An Claíomh Solais (The Sword of Light) is set in the Co. Meath Gaeltacht of Ráth Cairn in the months preceding the setting up of the first Irish-language television channel, TG4, as a young independent television producer returns to Ireland and installs himself in the Gaeltacht to take part in what he hopes will be a cultural revolution. A parallel subplot deals with Irish nationalist George Augustus Moore's return to Ireland to take part in the Irish Literary Revival, and Wagner's opera Siegfried.
