= Fontenoy (novel) =

Book by Liam Mac Cóil

- Author: Liam Mac Cóil
- Publisher: Leabhar Breac
- Publication date: 2005
- ISBN: 0-89833-225-7

Published in 2005, Fontenoy is the third novel by the Irish novelist Liam Mac Cóil, and a winner of the Gradam Uí Shúilleabháin award in 2006.

The novel centres on a box of printers' proofs in a Gaelic font recently found by the author in an archive in the French city of Chartres. The pages contain an account of the Battle of Fontenoy, during the Austrian War of Succession, written by a fictional Irish captain of the Irish Brigade, known as the Wild Geese. While on one hand, Fontenoy is a fictional account of the French victory told from the perspective of an Irishman serving in the army of King Louis XV of France, on the other hand it is a novel that explores perspectives in general, and in the writing of history in particular.

In his review in The Irish Times, Alan Titley praised the novel highly, singling out for special mention the author's artistry and clarity of style.
