= The Fontenay =

Hotel in Hamburg, Germany

Coordinates: 53°33′55.6″N 9°59′52.49″E

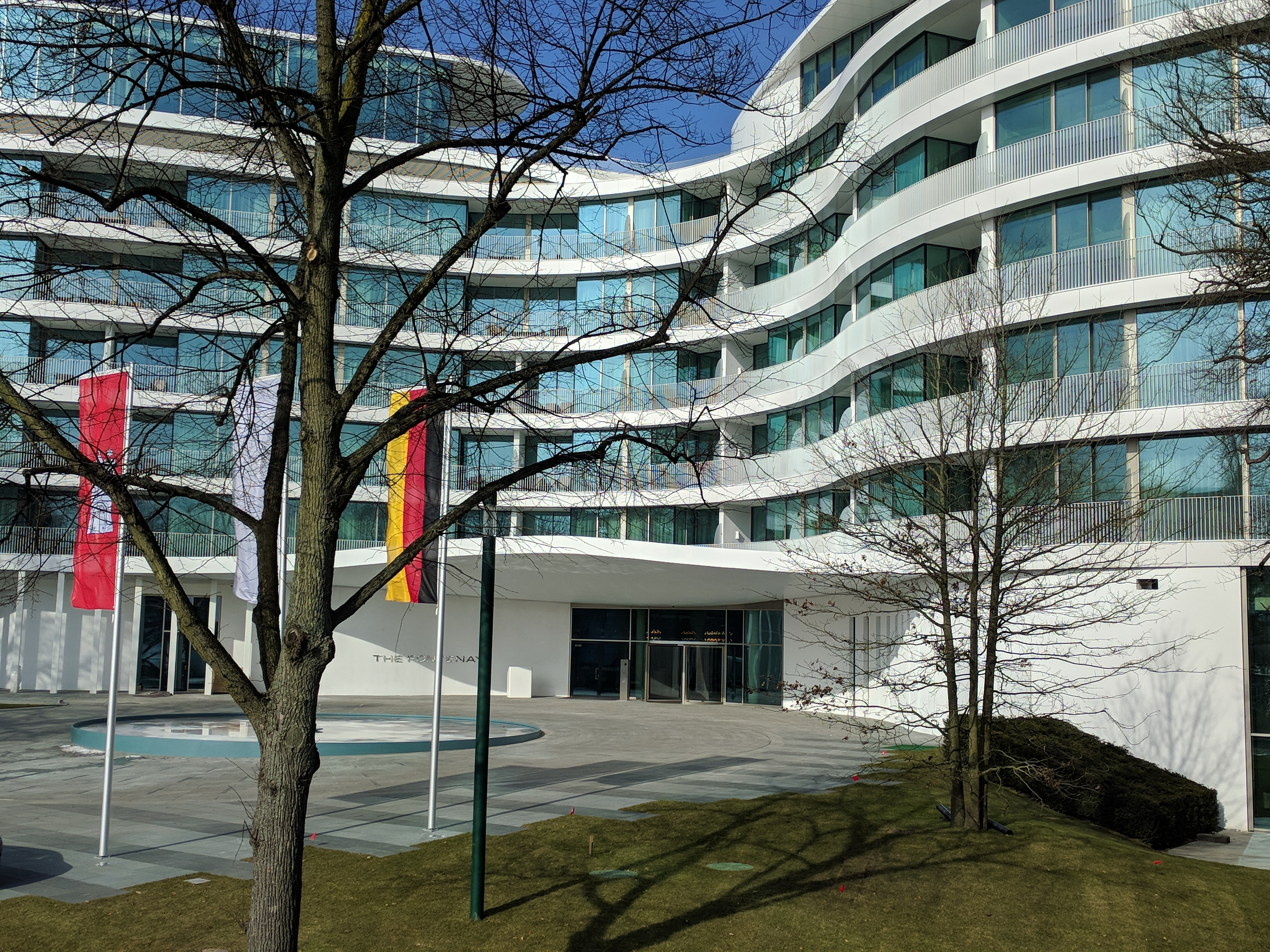
The Fontenay Hamburg (March 2018)

The Fontenay is a luxury hotel in Hamburg, Germany. The hotel is part of the consortium The Leading Hotels of the World.

== Hotel ==
Builder and owner is Klaus-Michael Kühne. The building is located in Hamburg-Rotherbaum on the road Fontenay on the southwestern shores of Außenalster and offers 131 guest rooms and suites, some with Alster view. The organic architecture was designed by the architect Jan Störmer. The lobby, called Atrium Lounge, has a room height of 27 meters.

For the lobby William Brand of the atelier Brand van Egmond was commissionend to create the light installation, with a height of 6 meters.

== History ==
The hotel is named after the shipbroker John Fontenay, who acquired a large plot of land in front of the Dammtor at the Aussenalster in 1816, through which today the street Fontenay runs. The building stands on the site of the former InterContinental hotel, also called InterConti. It had to close in February 2013 due to bankruptcy. In March 2013 it was announced that Klaus-Michael Kühne had acquired the hotel for around 20 million euros, who demolished it in February 2014.

The cornerstone ceremony for The Fontenay Hamburg took place on 14 August 2014. Originally the hotel opening was planned for the summer of 2016. In November 2015, the topping-out ceremony was celebrated and announced that there were delays. Due to a water damage in the summer of 2017, the appointment was again postponed several times. The Fontenay was officially opened on 19 March 2018.
