= Le Trianon Apartments =

Historic building in Hollywood, California

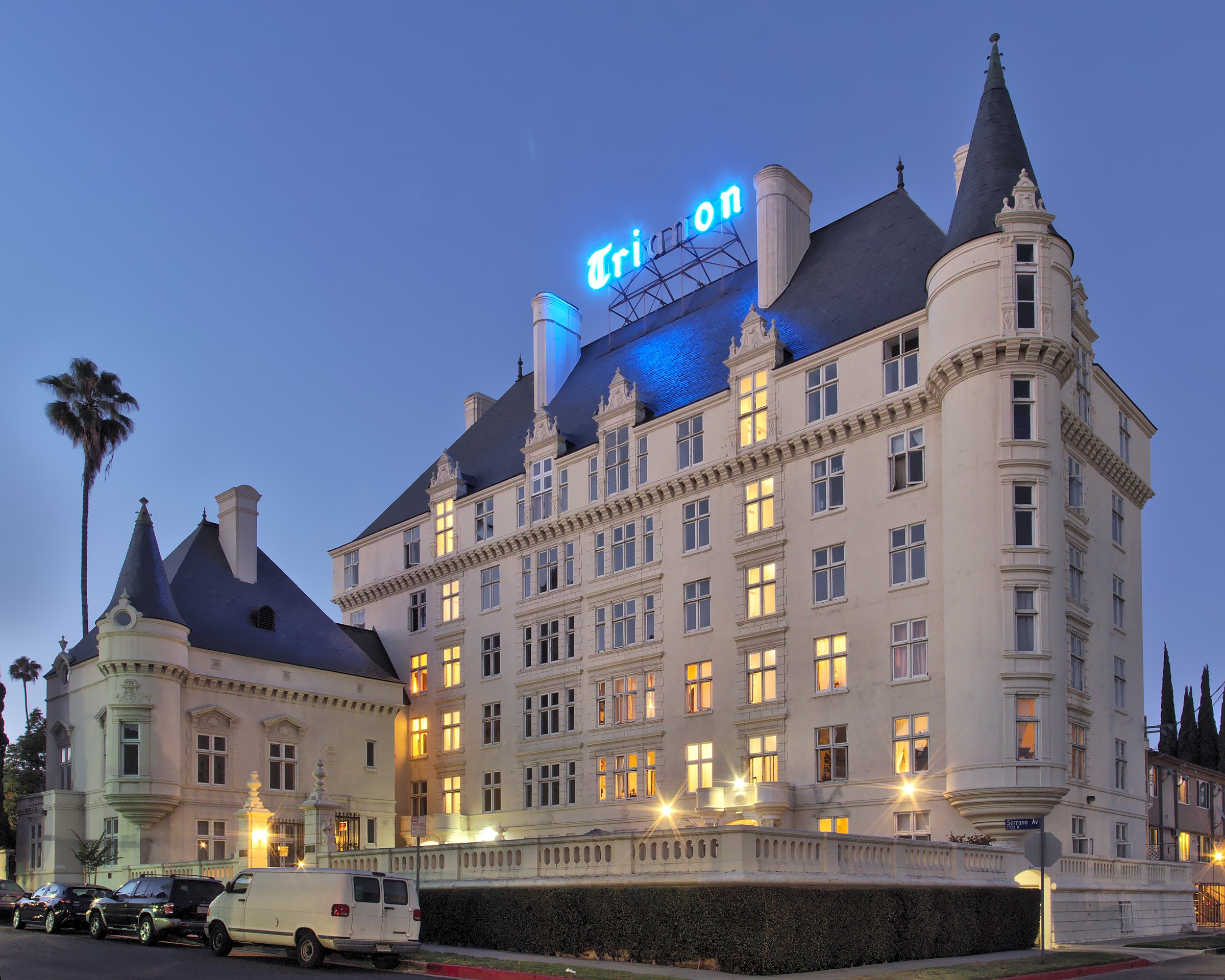
- The building in 2015
- Interactive map of the Le Trianon Apartments area

General information
- Architectural style: French-Norman; Chateausque Revival
- Location: 1750-1754 N Serrano Avenue, Hollywood, California
- Coordinates: 34.103°N 118.307°W
- Year built: 1928

Design and construction
- Architect: Leland Bryant

Website
- https://trianonapartments.com

Los Angeles Historic-Cultural Monument
- Designated: June 23, 1995
- Reference no.: 616

Le Trianon Apartments is a historic apartment complex located at 1750-1754 N Serrano Avenue in Hollywood, California. It is considered a masterpiece and one of the most iconic buildings in Los Angeles.

== History ==
Le Trianon Apartments, built in 1928, was commissioned by Mary Pickford and Douglas Fairbanks and designed by Leland Bryant. Pickford, Fairbanks, and Bryant all resided in the building, which was misnamed after a Neoclassical building at Versailles.

The building and roof sign above it were designated Los Angeles Historic Cultural Monument #616 on June 23, 1995.

The building was sold for $5.4 million in 2004 ($9.2 million in 2025). It was put up for sale again in 2012.

== Architecture and design ==
Le Trianon Apartments was designed in the French-Norman/Chateauesque Revival style. It consists of a six-story tower and three-story wing, and features steep pitched slate roofs, round tourelles with conical, candle-snuffer roofs, and a neon sign on the six-story roof. Additional design features include an ivory white façade, tall chimneys, wall dormers with narrow windows, and a grand patio entrance.
