= Revivalism (architecture) =

Architectural styles that echo the style of a previous architectural era

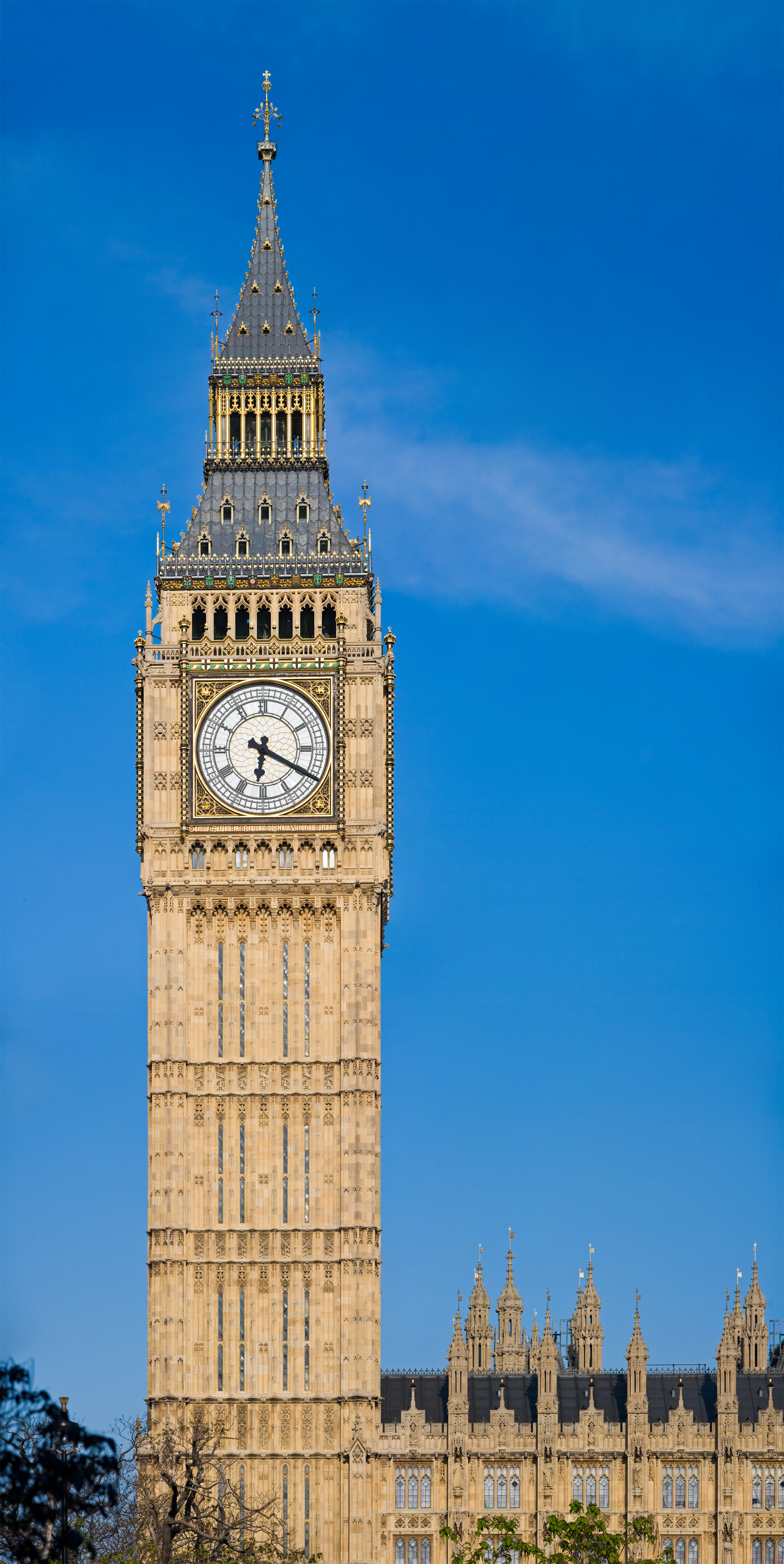
One of the most famous Gothic Revival structures, Elizabeth Tower (Big Ben) sits at the Palace of Westminster in London.

Architectural revivalism is the use of elements that echo the style of a previous architectural era that have or had fallen into disuse or abeyance between their heyday and period of revival. Revivalism, in a narrower sense, refers to the period of and movement within Western architectural history during which a succession of antecedent and reminiscent styles were taken to by architects, roughly from the mid-18th century, and which was itself succeeded by Modernism around the late 19th and early 20th centuries. Notable revival styles include Neoclassical architecture (a revival of Classical architecture), and Gothic Revival (a revival of Gothic architecture). Revivalism is related to historicism.

Western architecture of the 19th century, including Victorian architecture, is an example of Revivalism.

== History ==
=== Mid-18th–early 20th centuries ===
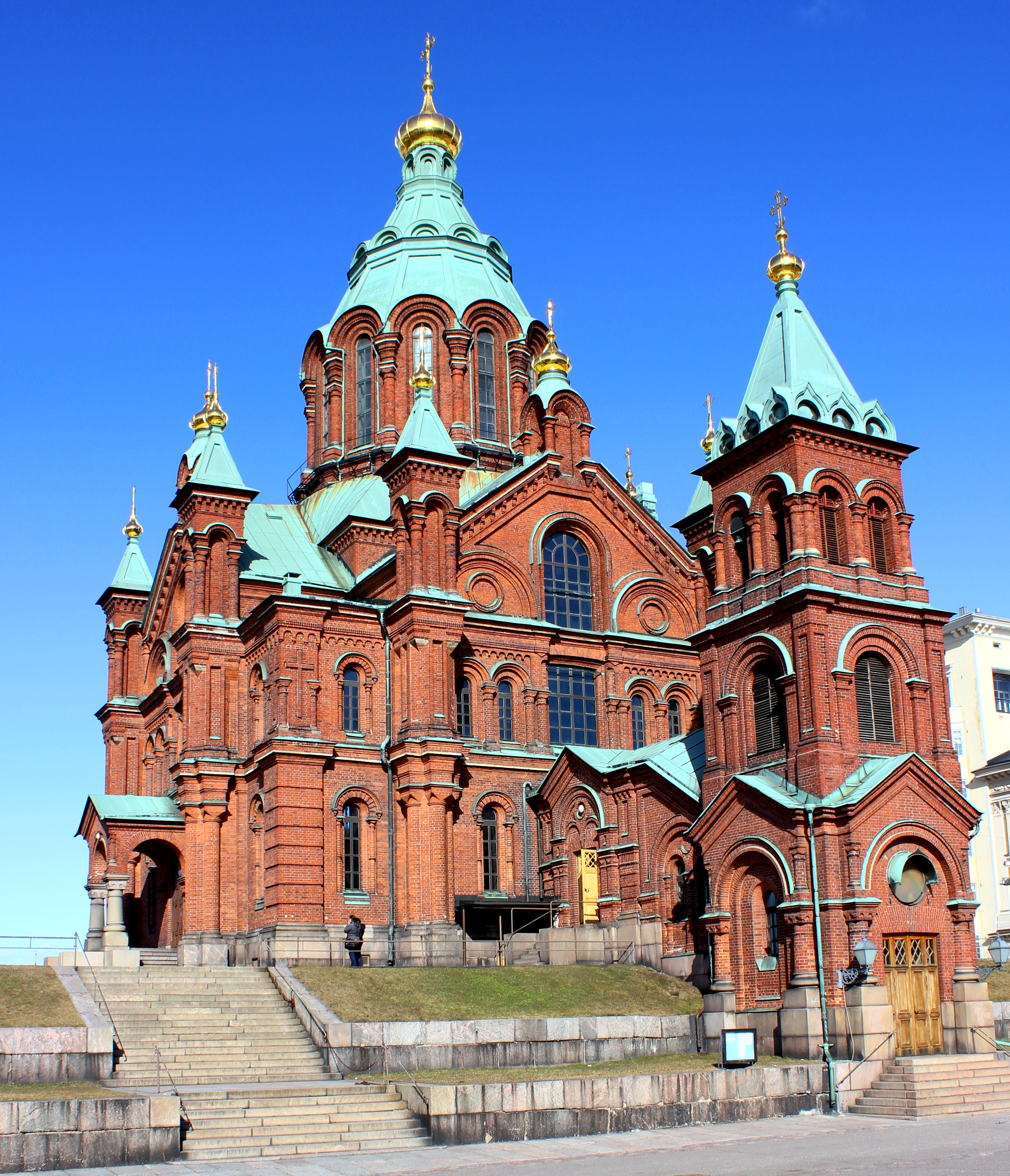
The Russian Revival-representing Uspenski Cathedral from 1868 in Katajanokka, Helsinki, Finland

The idea that architecture might represent the glory of kingdoms can be traced to the dawn of civilisation, but the notion that architecture can bear the stamp of national character is a modern idea, that appeared in the historical and philosophical writing of the 18th century and was given political currency in the wake of the French Revolution. As the map of Europe was repeatedly changing, architecture was used to grant the aura of a glorious past to even the most recent of nations. In addition to the credo of universal Classicism, two new, and often contradictory, attitudes on historical styles existed in the early 19th century. Pluralism promoted the simultaneous use of the expanded range of style, while Revivalism held that a single historical model was appropriate for modern architecture. Associations between styles and building types appeared, for example: Egyptian for prisons, Gothic for churches, or Renaissance Revival for banks and exchanges. These choices were the result of other associations: the pharaohs with death and eternity, the Middle Ages with Christianity, or the Medici family with the rise of banking and modern commerce.

Whether their choice was Classical, medieval, or Renaissance, all Revivalists shared the strategy of advocating a particular style based on national history, one of the great enterprises of historians from the mid-18th to early 19th centuries. Only one historic period was claimed to be the only one capable of providing models grounded in national traditions, institutions, or values. Issues of style became matters of state.

The most well-known Revivalist style is the Gothic Revival one, that appeared in the mid-18th century in the houses of a number of wealthy antiquarians in England, a notable example being the Strawberry Hill House. German Romantic writers and architects were the first to promote Gothic as a powerful expression of national character, and in turn use it as a symbol of national identity in territories still divided. Johann Gottfried Herder posed the question 'Why should we always imitate foreigners, as if we were Greeks or Romans?'.

=== Mid-20th century–present ===
Modern-day revival styles are frequently placed under the heading of New Classical architecture.

== Styles ==
=== Mixed ===
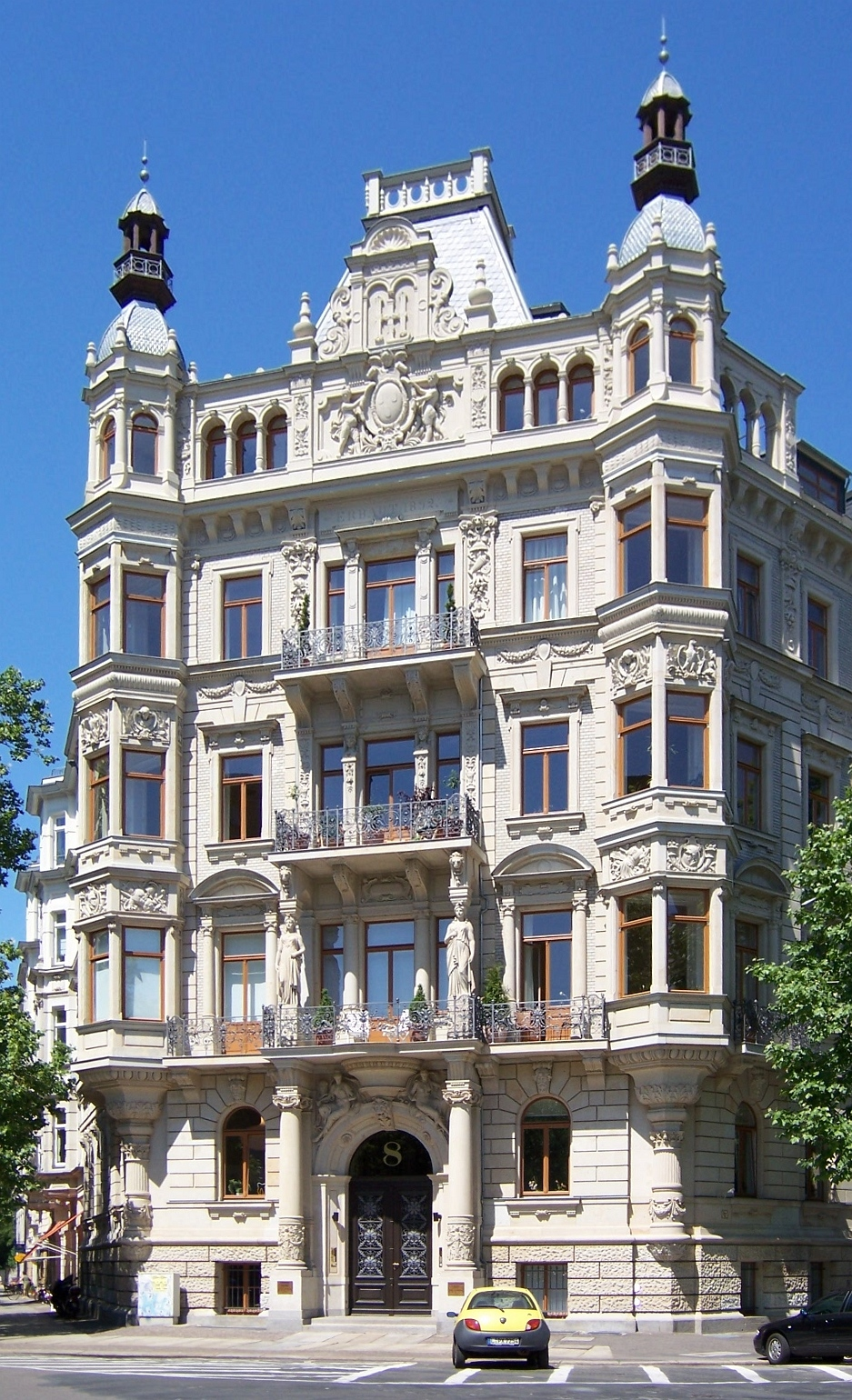
Typical historicist house: Gründerzeit building by Arwed Roßbach in Leipzig, Germany (built in 1892)

- Eclecticism – Conscious mixing of disparate historical styles
- Historicism or Historism – mixed revivals that can include several older styles, combined with new elements
- Indo-Saracenic architecture (revival of Indian architecture and Islamic architecture)
- Mediterranean Revival architecture (revival of Italian Renaissance architecture and Spanish Baroque architecture)
- New Classical Architecture – an umbrella term for modern-day architecture following pre-modernist principles
- Russian Revival architecture – generic term for a number of different movements within Russian architecture that arose in second quarter of the 19th century.
- Traditionalist School – revival of different regional traditional styles
- Vernacular architecture – umbrella term for regional architecture traditions continuing through the eras, also used and cited in revival architecture

=== Ancient Revival ===
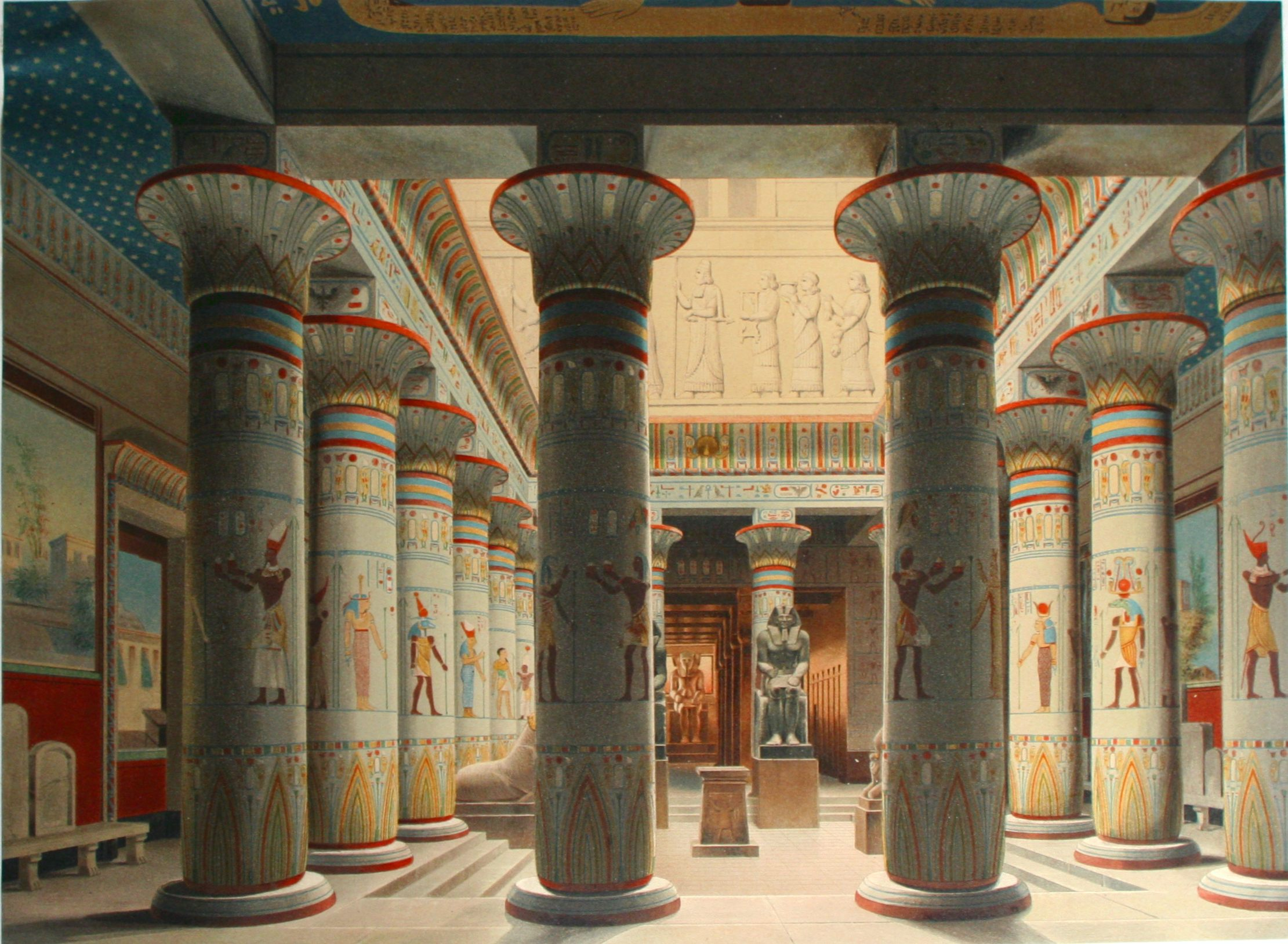
1862 lithograph of the Aegyptischer Hof (English: Egyptian court), from the Neues Museum (Berlin), built in the Neo-Egyptian style

- Egyptian Revival architecture (revival of Ancient Egyptian architecture)
- Mycenaean Revival architecture (revival of Mycenaean Greek architecture)
- Renaissance architecture (earlier revival of Classical architecture)
- Neoclassical architecture (later revival of Classical architecture)
  - Palladian architecture
  - Louis XVI style
  - Federal architecture
  - Jeffersonian architecture
  - Empire style
  - Regency architecture
  - Beaux-Arts architecture (also in the City Beautiful movement)
  - Russian neoclassical revival
- Greek Revival architecture and Neo-Grec (revivals of Ancient Greek architecture)

=== Medieval Revival ===
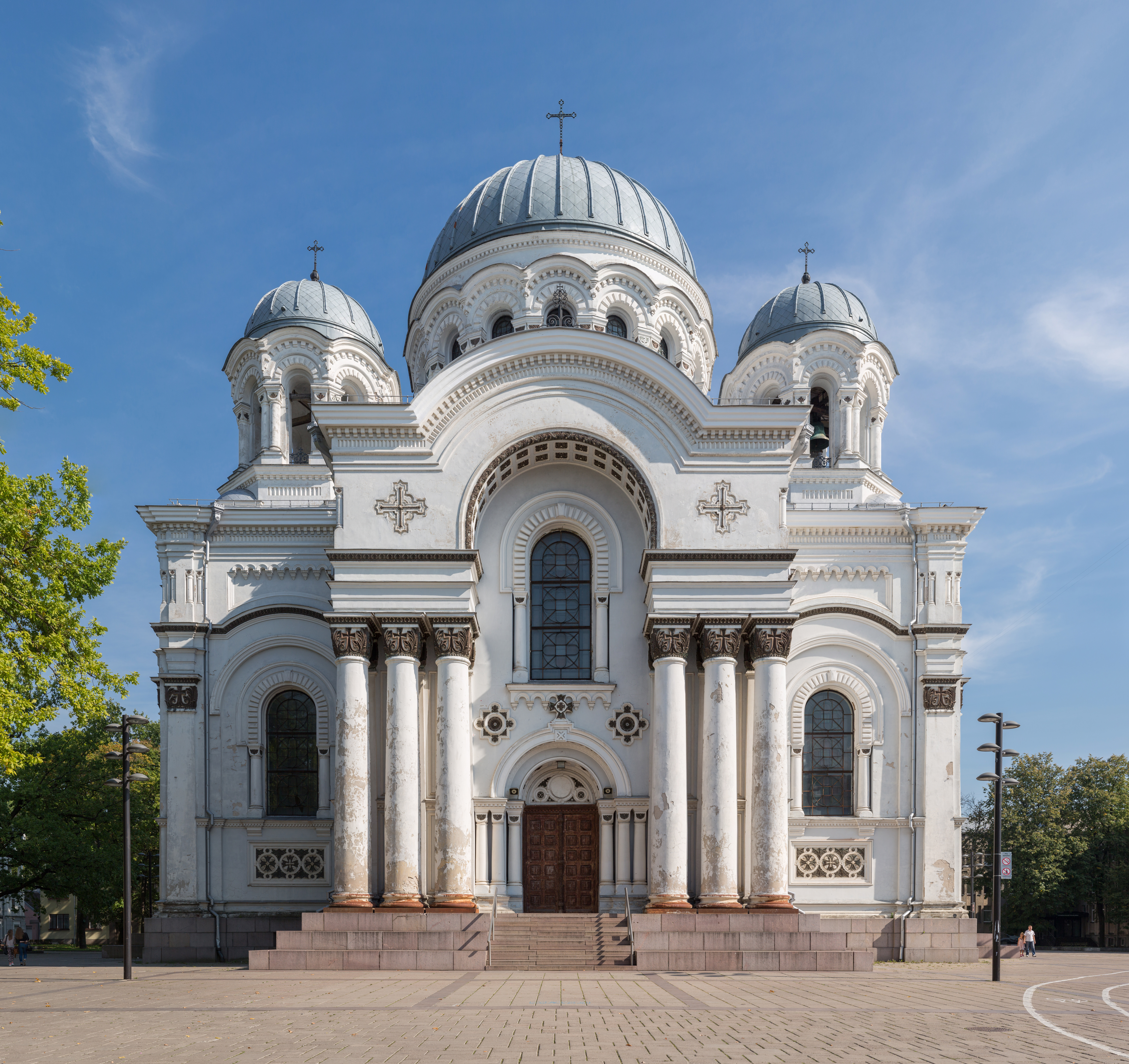
St. Michael the Archangel Church in Kaunas was built in Neo-Byzantine style

- Byzantine Revival architecture (revival of Byzantine architecture)
  - Bristol Byzantine
  - Russo-Byzantine architecture
  - Romanian Revival
  - Serbo-Byzantine revival
- Romanesque Revival architecture (revival of Romanesque architecture)
  - Romanesque Revival Architecture in the United Kingdom
  - Richardsonian Romanesque
- Gothic Revival architecture (revival of Gothic architecture)
  - Carpenter Gothic
  - Collegiate Gothic
  - High Victorian Gothic
  - Scots Baronial Style architecture
  - Neo-Manueline (revival of Manueline)
- Moorish Revival architecture (revival of Moorish architecture)
  - Neo-Mudéjar
- Tudor Revival architecture (revival of Tudor Style architecture)
  - Black-and-white Revival architecture

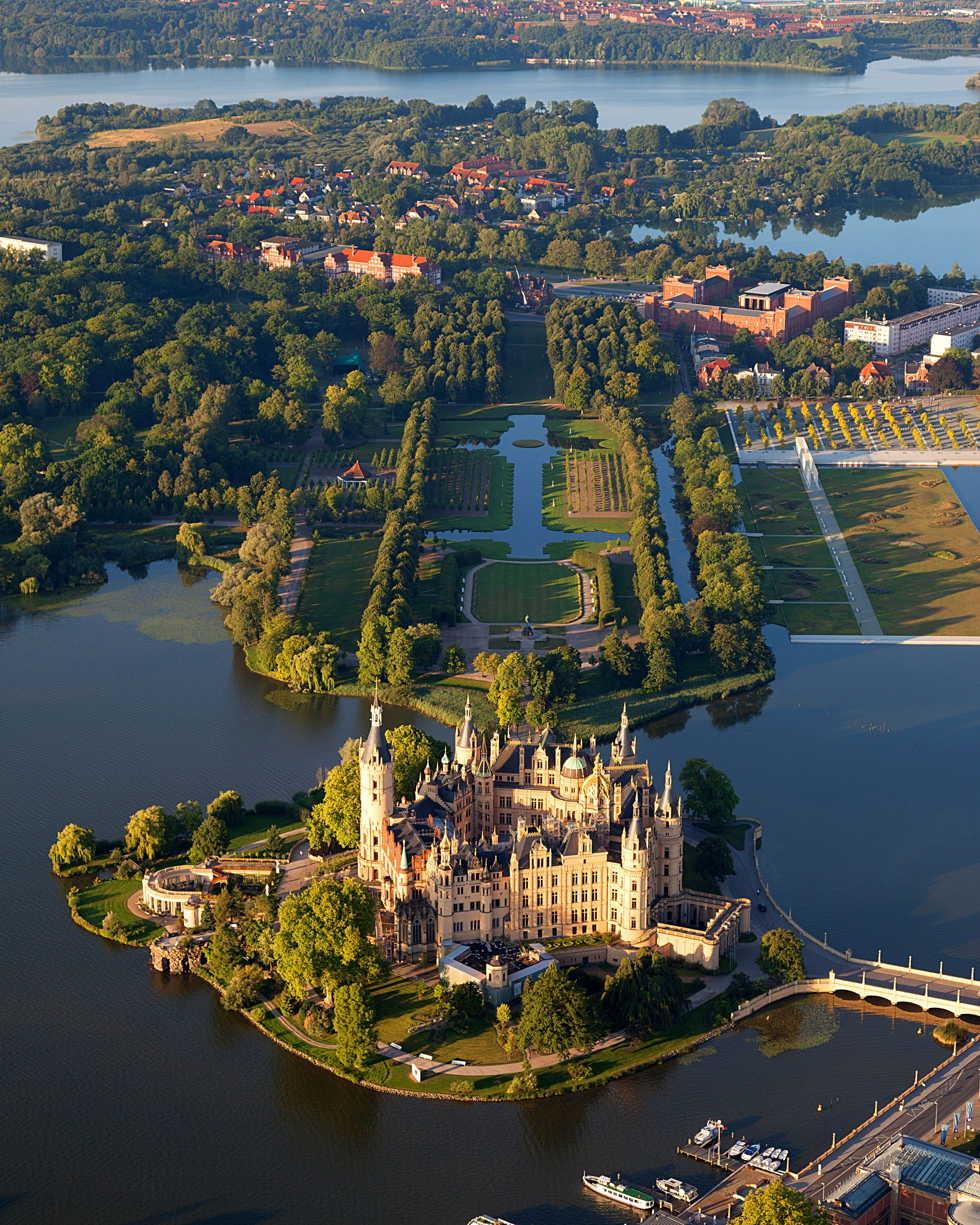
Schwerin Palace, historical ducal seat of Mecklenburg, Germany – an example of pompous Renaissance Revival for representation purposes (built in 1857)

=== Renaissance Revival ===
- Renaissance Revival architecture (revival of Renaissance architecture)
  - Italianate architecture
  - Palazzo style architecture – revival based on Italian Palazzo
  - Mediterranean Revival architecture (revival of Italian Renaissance architecture & Spanish Renaissance architecture)
  - Palladian Revival architecture (revival of Palladian architecture)
  - Châteauesque (revival of French Renaissance architecture)
  - Jacobethan (revival of Jacobean architecture and Elizabethan architecture)
  - Stile Umbertino (revival of Italian Renaissance architecture)

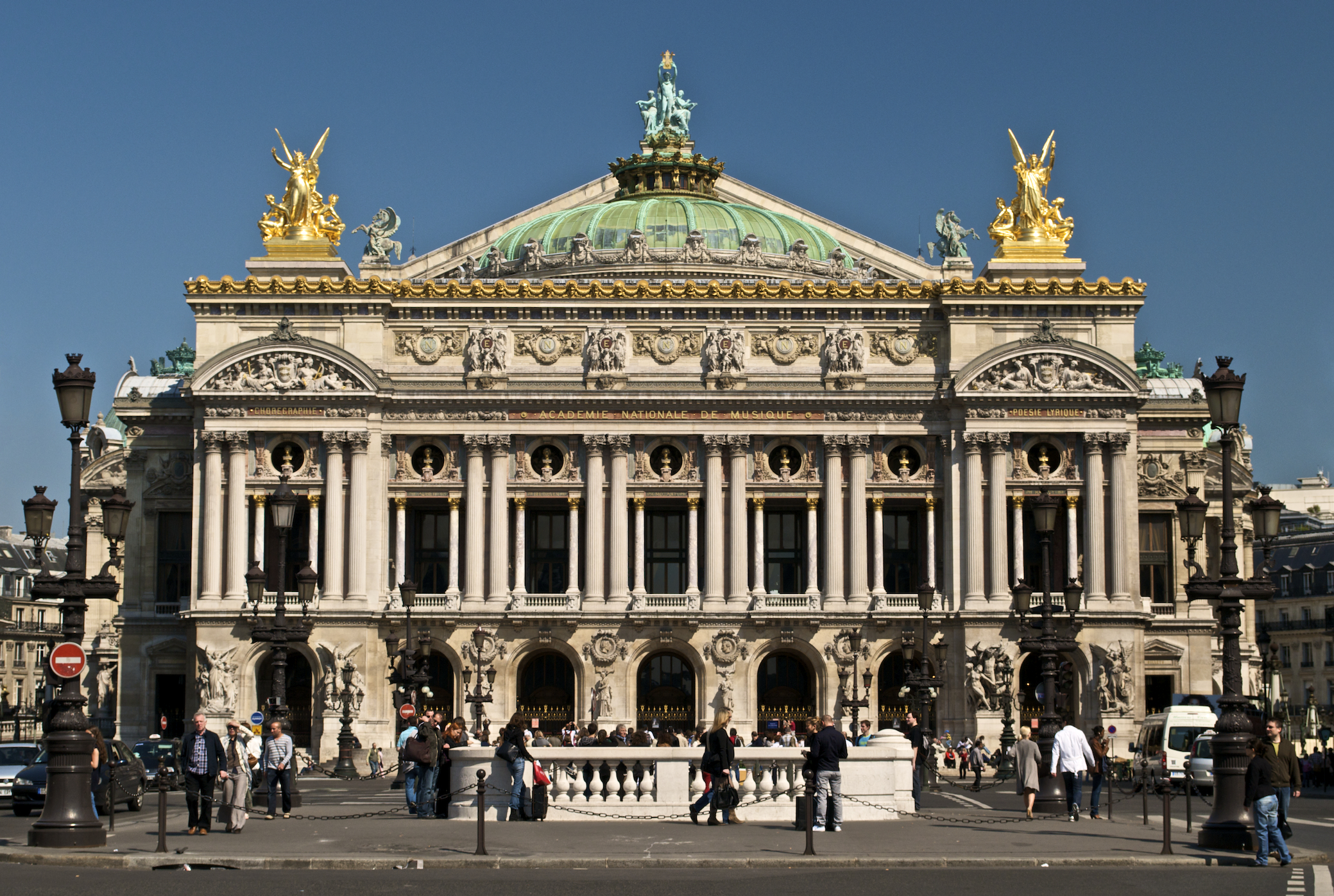
Opera, Paris (Palais Garnier) by Charles Garnier, 1861–1875

=== Baroque Revival ===
- Baroque Revival architecture (revival of Baroque architecture)
  - Dutch Revival architecture (revival of Dutch Baroque architecture)
  - Spanish Revival architecture (revival of Spanish Baroque architecture)
  - Edwardian Baroque architecture
  - Stalinist baroque
  - English Baroque
  - California Churrigueresque (revival of Churrigueresque and Mexican Baroque)

=== Other revival ===
- Neo Art Deco (revival of Art Deco architecture)
- Cape Cod Revival (revival of Cape Cod)
- Dutch Colonial Revival architecture (revival of Dutch Colonial architecture)
- Georgian Revival architecture (revival of Georgian architecture)
  - Colonial Revival architecture (revival of American Colonial architecture)
- Mayan Revival architecture (revival of Maya architecture)
- Pueblo Revival Style architecture (revival of Puebloan traditional architecture)
- Spanish Colonial Revival architecture (revival of Spanish Colonial architecture)
  - Mission Revival Style architecture (revival of the architecture of the California missions)
- Territorial Revival architecture (revival of Territorial architecture)
