= Sunset Tower =

- The Sunset Tower Hotel
- U.S. National Register of Historic Places
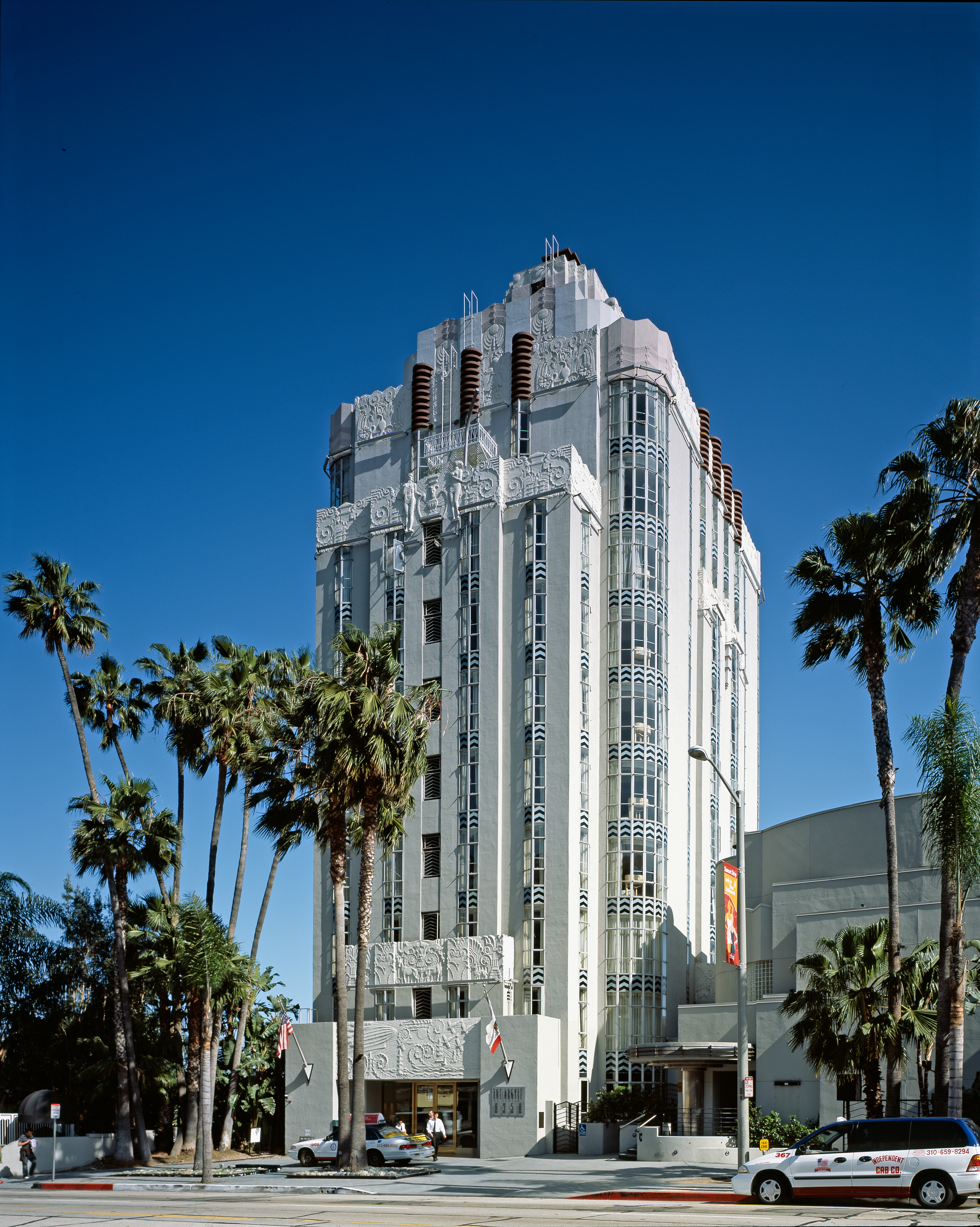
- The Sunset Tower Hotel

- Location within the Los Angeles metropolitan area Location within California Location within the United States
- Location: 8358 Sunset Blvd., West Hollywood, California
- Coordinates: 34°5′42″N 118°22′17″W
- Built: 1931
- Architect: Leland A. Bryant
- Architectural style: Art Deco
- NRHP reference No.: 80000812
- Added to NRHP: May 30, 1980

The Sunset Tower Hotel, previously known as The St. James's Club and The Argyle, is a historic building and hotel located on the Sunset Strip in West Hollywood, California, United States. Designed in 1929 by architect Leland A. Bryant, opened in 1931, it is considered one of the finest examples of Art Deco architecture in the Los Angeles area. In its early years, it was the residence of many Hollywood celebrities, including John Wayne and Howard Hughes. After a period of decline in the early 1980s, the building was renovated and has been operated as a luxury hotel under the names The St. James's Club, The Argyle, and most recently the Sunset Tower Hotel. The building was added to the National Register of Historic Places in 1980.

== Construction and architecture ==
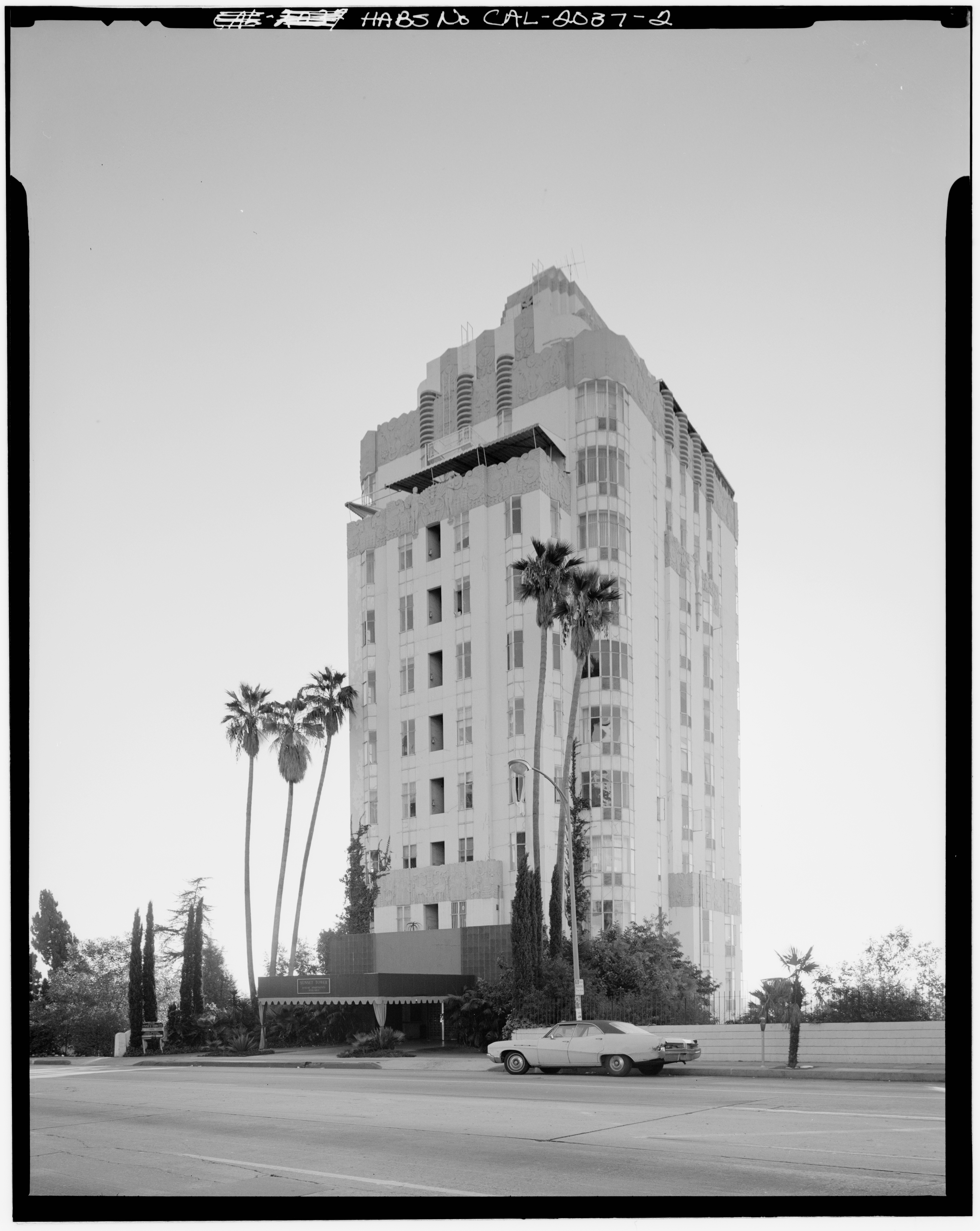
Sunset Tower Apartments, date unknown

The art deco Sunset Tower is considered one of the finest examples of the Streamline Moderne form of Art Deco architecture in Southern California. In their guide to Los Angeles architecture, David Gebhard and Robert Winter wrote that "this tower is a first class monument of the Zig Zag Moderne and as much an emblem of Hollywood as the Hollywood sign." It is situated in a commanding location on the Sunset Strip with views of the city and is decorated with plaster friezes of plants, animals, zeppelins, legendary creatures and Adam and Eve. Originally operated as a luxury apartment hotel, it was one of the first high-rise reinforced concrete buildings in California. When it was completed in August 1931 at a cost of $750,000, the Los Angeles Times reported: "What is described to be the tallest apartment-house in Los Angeles County, rising 15 stories or 195 feet, was completed last week at Kings Road and Sunset Boulevard by W.I. Moffett, general contractor, for E.M. Fleming, owner."

== Hollywood landmark ==
Marketing the building to Hollywood celebrities, an advertisement in the February 1938 issue of the Screen Actors Guild magazine read: "Faultless in Appointment-The Ultimate in Privacy . . . Hollywood's Most Distinguished Address." In 1933, the Los Angeles Times ran an article about the trend toward luxurious penthouse apartments in the city and noted that Sunset Tower boasted the city's highest penthouse: "It is the highest in the city and due to the location of the fifteen-story structure that supports it, its tenants live on a level with the tower of the Los Angeles City Hall. Imagine the view!" John Wayne, Howard Hughes, Frank Sinatra, Jerry Buss and novelist James Wohl lived in the penthouse at different times, and Hughes reportedly also rented some of the lower apartments for his girlfriends or mistresses. John Wayne reportedly once brought a cow up to his penthouse apartment at 3 a.m. telling his party guests who were gathering for coffee that they would have to go directly to the source if they wanted cream. Other former residents include Clark Gable, Errol Flynn, Marilyn Monroe, Michael Caine, Quincy Jones, Roger Moore, Zsa Zsa Gabor, Billie Burke, Joseph Schenck, Paulette Goddard, Zasu Pitts, George Stevens, Preston Sturges, Carol Kane, and River Phoenix.

In 1944, Bugsy Siegel, described by the Los Angeles Times as a "Hollywood sportsman," was charged with placing bets via long distance in the Sunset Tower apartment of his associate, Allen Smiley. Also at Smiley's apartment that day were A-list actor George Raft and Siegel's sister's husband, Sol Solloway. Neither Raft nor Solloway was arrested. Siegel called it "a bum rap," and witnesses testified that Siegel and his friends were only playing "a friendly game of gin rummy." Siegel and Smiley later pleaded guilty, paid $250 fines.

The building is often incorrectly cited as the venue for the "Battle of the Balcony," in August 1944, in which bandleader Tommy Dorsey, Dorsey's wife Patricia Dane and Siegel associate Allen Smiley fought actor Jon Hall on the balcony of Dorsey's apartment. The fight actually took place down the street at the Sunset Plaza Apartments, where Smiley had moved after his bookmaking arrest at the Sunset Tower in May. Dorsey, Dane and Smiley were later charged with felonious assault. After a trial, complete with a media circus, charges were dropped on December 7, 1944.

In 1947, Truman Capote wrote in a letter: " I am living in a very posh establishment, the Sunset Tower, which, or so the local gentry tell me, is where every scandal that ever happened happened." Others report that the Sunset Tower was "notorious for having the best-kept call girls in Hollywood."

The hotel has also appeared in several feature films, including Murder, My Sweet, The Italian Job, Lionheart, The Player, Strange Days, Get Shorty, and Freaky Friday (2003). In the television show Cannon, the titular character (portrayed by William Conrad) resided at the tower, and the building's exterior was featured prominently throughout the series. The hotel is also used for exterior shots of LUX in the series Lucifer.

== Decline in the 1980s ==
By 1982, a plan to convert the building to condominiums failed, and construction was halted abruptly with residents still living there. The building had deteriorated and was described as "like something from a war-ravaged land." At the time, resident Werner Klemperer (Col. Klink from Hogan's Heroes) said of the building: "Welcome to Beirut West."

== The St. James's Club ==
The building was saved from deterioration and possible demolition when it was purchased in 1985 from architect David Lawrence Gray, FAIA by Peter de Savary who promised to "lovingly restore" the building to its former glory by spending $25 million to convert the building into the first American branch of his luxury hotel chain, the St. James's Club. David Gray's firm handled the restoration, and in 1988 the Los Angeles Conservancy gave the owners an award for their work in preserving the Sunset Tower. The exterior and interior lighting design (excluding fixtures) was completed by ex-Disney designers Shawn Barrett, Gary Bell and William Sly. The St. James's Club operated an upscale hotel for several years, popular with celebrities, including David Bowie.

== Further restoration and the Tower Bar ==
The Lancaster Group purchased the hotel from de Savary in 1992, renaming it the Argyle. In 2004, Jeff Klein and Peter Krulewitch purchased the hotel. Klein hired designer Paul Fortune to renovate the hotel, adding more modern amenities, and restored its original name. In 2006, Toronto's The Globe and Mail reviewed the renovated Sunset Tower and noted: "This isn't a place that needs to declare itself 'hip' because its grand history speaks for itself—and has been successfully carried forward to the present."

As part of the 2006 restoration, the Tower Bar was reconfigured to have a more turn-of-the-century ambience. After the Tower Bar opened in 2006, the Los Angeles Times reported that it had become one of the trendiest in Los Angeles: "On a recent night at the intimate Tower Bar, Jennifer Aniston dines 10 feet away from Joaquin Phoenix and white-coated waiters weave between tables like players in a Broadway musical. A $155 bottle of Pinot Noir is uncorked here, chilled oysters delivered there and a bow given every now and then." The New York Times also reported on the transformation of the hotel: "The striped silk-and-walnut Tower Bar restaurant is already a retro clubhouse for the mature Hollywood set (think Brian Grazer and Barbara Walters), complete with $13 martinis and the octogenarian former Sinatra pianist Page Cavanaugh tickling the ivories. On a Friday night in mid-December, Anjelica Huston and Courtney Love swanned by to dine with a 30-something crowd far more sophisticated than the teenyboppers roaming Sunset Boulevard outside." Other celebrities visiting the Tower Bar include Sean Penn, Victoria Beckham, Tom Cruise and Jennifer Lopez. Dmitri Dmitrov, a 60-year-old Macedonian immigrant with Rudolph Valentino hair, is the Tower Bar's maître d'hôtel. Dmitrov is a sphinxlike figure who knows everything and says nothing. In the six years since Klein, following a suggestion from the designer Tom Ford, rescued Dmitrov from a fading career at drearily elegant places like a local Russian restaurant that featured a harpist, ice swans and a caviar menu, he has become a Hollywood institution.

In February 2009, Vanity Fair magazine hosted its Oscar party at the Sunset Tower.

== Historic designation ==
The building was listed on the National Register of Historic Places in 1980.

== In popular culture ==
The Sunset Tower hotel is especially noted in musical media, with a line in “David” by Lorde. “Sunset Tower” by Conan Gray talks about the historic hotel as a form of location. “I Love Hollywood!” by Slayyyter, also mentions the hotel

Lots of movies have been filmed there, such as “The Italian Job” and “Murder, My Sweet”.

== See also ==
- List of Registered Historic Places in Los Angeles County, California
