= List of Los Angeles Historic-Cultural Monuments in Hollywood =

This is a list of Los Angeles Historic-Cultural Monuments in Hollywood, Los Angeles, California, United States. The list includes Hollywood, as well as Griffith Park and the communities of Los Feliz and Little Armenia. There are more than 148 Historic-Cultural Monuments (HCM) in this area. They are designated by the city's Cultural Heritage Commission.

== Historic-Cultural Monuments ==
HCM #	Landmark name	Image	Date designated	Locality	Neighborhood	Description
12	Hollyhock House		April 1, 1963	4800 Hollywood Blvd. 34.1000°N 118.2944°W	Little Armenia	House designed by Frank Lloyd Wright as a residence for oil heiress Aline Barnsdall; built 1919–1921
20	Two Stone Gates		May 24, 1963	Westshire Dr. & Belden Beachwood Dr. 34°7′11″N 118°19′15″W	Hollywood	Gates built by European stonemasons in the early 1920s marking the official entrance to the Hollywoodland subdivision
33	Barnsdall Arts Center (Residence "A")		February 26, 1965	4800 Hollywood Blvd.34.1009°N 118.2934°W	Little Armenia	Ostensibly designed as a secondary residence to Hollyhock House, became the Arts and Crafts Building, then fell into disuse
34	Barnsdall Art Park		February 26, 1965	4800 Hollywood Blvd.34.100°N 118.294°W	Little Armenia	Art complex designed in 1920s for Aline Barnsdall, by Rudolph Schindler, Lloyd Wright, and Edward Farrell; including Hollyhock House by Frank Lloyd Wright
55	Grauman's Chinese Theatre	Grauman's Chinese Theater	June 5, 1968	6925 Hollywood Blvd. 34°6′05″N 118°20′27″W	Hollywood	Landmark theater on Hollywood Blvd.
58	Jim Henson Company Lot (Original Charlie Chaplin Studio)		February 5, 1969	1416 N. La Brea Ave. 34°5′48″N 118°20′37″W	Hollywood	Built in 1919, one of the first complete motion picture studios in Hollywood.
67	Cedar Trees		May 20, 1970	Los Feliz Blvd.	Los Feliz	Cedar trees planted in 1916 beautification effort; located between Riverside Dr. and Western Ave.
96	Storer House		February 23, 1972	8161 Hollywood Blvd. 34°6′03″N 118°22′01″W	Sunset Hills	Textile block house designed by Frank Lloyd Wright (1923), with Lloyd Wright
111	The "Hollywood" Sign Atop Mount Lee		February 7, 1973	Atop Mt. Lee; 34°8′02″N 118°19′17″W	Beachwood Canyon	Erected in 1923 as advertising for "Hollywoodland" development; one of the most recognized symbols of Los Angeles
112	Tongva-Gabrieliño village site		March 7, 1973	Fern Dell area of Griffith Park	Griffith Park	Site of Tongva-Gabrieliño Native American village (rediscovered by archeologists at Fern Dell Canyon mouth)
123	Lovell Health House		March 20, 1974	4616 Dundee Dr. 34°7′05″N 118°17′16″W	Los Feliz	Landmark steel-frame house designed by Richard Neutra in the International style in 1929
126	Shakespeare Bridge		April 17, 1974	34°6′20″N 118°16′46″W	Los Feliz	
130	Samuel-Novarro House		July 17, 1974	5609 Valley Oak Dr. 34°7′05″N 118°18′43″W	Hollywood	Art Deco house designed by Lloyd Wright (1920s)
134	Crossroads of the World		December 4, 1974	6678-6684 Selma Ave. 34°5′53″N 118°20′08″W	Hollywood	
136	Saint Mary of the Angels		December 4, 1974	4510 Finley Ave. 34°6′26″N 118°17′16″W	Los Feliz	Anglo-Catholic church built in 1930
149	Ennis-Brown House		March 3, 1976	2607 Glendower Ave. 34°6′58″N 118°17′34″W	Los Feliz	designed by Frank Lloyd Wright (1924), with Lloyd Wright
151	Chateau Marmont		March 24, 1976	8225 Marmont Ln. 34°5′53″N 118°22′07″W	Sunset Hills	
162	William Mulholland Memorial Fountain		October 6, 1976	Los Feliz Blvd. & Riverside Dr. 34°6′58″N 118°16′18″W	Los Feliz	
163	Site of First Walt Disney Studio		October 6, 1976	2701-2739 Hyperion Ave.; 2710-2746 Griffith Park Blvd.; 3616-3618 Monon St. 34°6′27.39″N 118°16′20.4″W	Los Feliz	This HCM also includes the Animation School for the Walt Disney Studios from 1935 to 1940, across Hyperion Ave. See: List of Los Angeles Historic-Cultural Monuments in Silver Lake, Angelino Heights, and Echo Park
165	Fire Station No. 27	Engine Co. No. 27, home of the Fire Dept. Museum	October 20, 1976	1355 N. Cahuenga Blvd. 34°5′45″N 118°19′47″W	Hollywood	
168	Griffith Observatory		November 17, 1976	2500 E. Observatory Rd. 34°7′04″N 118°18′01″W	Griffith Park	The John C. Austin and F. M. Ashley designed observatory gives access to the public for cosmic discoveries of astronomy and modern science. It is an example of the Art Deco design.
175	YWCA Hollywood Studio Club	2008 photo	May 4, 1977	1215-1233 Lodi Pl. 34°5′34″N 118°19′21″W	Hollywood	Chaperoned dormitory for young women who wanted to become starlets
180	Sunset Bronson Studios		September 21, 1977	5800-5858 Sunset Blvd. 34°5′51″N 118°19′2″W	Hollywood	Site of the Filming of First Talking Film
181	Obelisk monument: Burial place of James B. Lankershim (north end of street)		January 18, 1978	Nichols Canyon Rd. 34°6′54″N 118°21′36″W	Nichols Canyon	
192	Franklin Garden Apartments		June 7, 1978	6915-6933 Franklin Ave.	Hollywood Heights	Demolished: 07-01-1978
193	Pantages Theater		July 5, 1978	6225-6249 Hollywood Blvd. 34°5′52″N 118°19′32″W	Hollywood	
194	Hollywood Walk of Fame		July 5, 1978	Hollywood Blvd., between Gower & Sycamore	Hollywood	
198	KCET Studios		September 20, 1978	4391-4421 Sunset Blvd. 34°6′06″N 118°17′04″W	Hollywood	
226	Masquers Club Building		August 29, 1979	1765 N. Sycamore Ave. 34°6′11″N 118°20′37″W	Hollywood	Former site of a social club for actors formed in 1925. Demolished in 1985.
227	Janes House		April 3, 1980	6541 Hollywood Blvd. 34°6′06″N 118°19′56″W	Hollywood	Queen Anne/Dutch Colonial Revival cottage built in 1903 with shingled gables and fanciful turrets; site of "The Misses Janes School of Hollywood" starting in 1911
231	El Greco Apartments		April 9, 1981	817 N. Hayworth Ave. 34°5′09″N 118°21′46″W	Hollywood	
233	Sunset Plaza Apartments		October 9, 1980	1216-1220 Sunset Plaza Dr.	Hollywood	Demolished: 07-01-1987
234	Taft House		November 3, 1980	7771-7791 Sunset Blvd.	Hollywood	Demolished: 06-01-1982
235	Bollman House		November 3, 1980	1530-1534 N. Ogden Dr. 34°5′56″N 118°21′32″W	Hollywood	1922, Lloyd Wright
243	Garden Court Apartments		April 28, 1981	7021 Hollywood Blvd.	Hollywood	Demolished: 1984
246	Residence at 1443 N. Martel Avenue		November 25, 1981	1443 N. Martel Ave. 34°5′49″N 118°21′03″W	Hollywood	
247	Samuel Freeman House		November 25, 1981	1962 Glencoe Way; 34°6′20″N 118°20′18″W	Hollywood Heights	Designed by Frank Lloyd Wright (1923), with Lloyd Wright
248	First United Methodist Church of Hollywood		December 4, 1981	6817 Franklin Ave. 34°6′15″N 118°20′19″W	Hollywood Heights	
260	Edwards House		May 17, 1983	5642 Holly Oak Dr. 34°6′43″N 118°18′45″W	Hollywood	Designed by Gregory Ain (1936)
277	Hollywood Masonic Temple	2008 photo	June 12, 1984	6840 Hollywood Blvd. 34°6′04″N 118°20′24″W	Hollywood	
285	C.E. Toberman Estate		October 3, 1984	1847 Camino Palmero; 34°6′17″N 118°21′01″W	Hollywood	
291	Highland-Camrose Bungalow Village		April 23, 1985	2103 N. Highland Ave. 34°6′31″N 118°20′14″W	Hollywood Heights	
301	Dorothy Arzner-Morgan Residence		October 29, 1986	2249 Mountain Oak Dr.		Landscape architects: Florence Yoch + Louise Council (1933)
303	John C. Fremont Branch Library		June 27, 1986	6121 Melrose Ave. 34°5′01″N 118°20′01″W	Hollywood	
314	Cahuenga Branch Library		October 24, 1986	4591 Santa Monica Blvd. 34°5′27″N 118°17′20″W	East Hollywood	One of 6 libraries built with a grant from Andrew Carnegie (best and smallest); designed by architect Clarence H. Russell; completed in 1916; 1-story Italian Renaissance style.
315	Villa Carlotta		October 28, 1986	1913-1915 Tamarind Ave.; 5959 Franklin Ave. 34°6′19″N 118°19′10″W	Hollywood	Luxury Apartment built in 1926 in a classic Colonial-style as a residence for Hollywood notables
316	William Stromberg Clock		January 7, 1987	6439 Hollywood Blvd.	Hollywood	The street clock is a landmark since 1927; associated with one of the street's oldest retailers.
325	Shulman House		August 26, 1987	7875 Woodrow Wilson Dr. 34°7′23″N 118°22′04″W		designed by Raphael Soriano (1950), for photographer Julius Shulman
329	Château Élysée		September 23, 1987	5930 Franklin Ave. 34°6′16″N 118°19′08″W	Hollywood	Now the Scientology Celebrity Centre
334	Security Trust and Savings		December 18, 1987	6381 Hollywood Blvd. 34°6′06″N 118°19′45″W	Hollywood	
336	Hollywood Western Building		January 6, 1988	5500 Hollywood Blvd. 34°6′06″N 118°18′34″W	Little Armenia	
343	Avocado Trees		January 22, 1988	4400 Avocado St. (entire block)	Los Feliz	
353	Monterey Apartments		May 11, 1988	4600-4604 Los Fellz Blvd. 34°6′41″N 118°17′23″W	Los Feliz	
382	Falcon Studios		July 26, 1988	5524 Hollywood Blvd. 34°6′4.37″N 118°18′37.81″W	Little Armenia	Rear studio building demolished 1988. Owner Ralph Faulkner taught fencing to early Hollywood stars Douglas Fairbanks Jr., Errol Flynn and Ronald Colman. Preservation dispute in 1988.
390	Jardinette Apartments		October 4, 1988	5128 Marathon St. 34.0847°N 118.3100°W	Hollywood	One of the first modernist buildings in the U.S.; designed by Richard Neutra, built 1928
397	Roman Gardens		November 23, 1988	2000 N. Highland Ave. 34°6′24″N 118°20′13″W	Hollywood	
401	Feliz Adobe		November 30, 1988	4730 Crystal Springs Dr. 34.1327°N 118.2805°W	Griffith Park	Original adobe of Rancho Los Feliz, heavily refurbished in the 1920s, now used by park staff
406	Magic Castle		January 17, 1989	7001 Franklin Ave. 34°6′16″N 118°20′30″W	Hollywood Heights	
421	Lake Hollywood Reservoir (including Mulholland Dam)		March 31, 1989	2460 Lake Hollywood Dr. 34°7′29″N 118°20′05″W		
435	Andalusia Apartments		May 16, 1989	1471 Havenhurst Dr. 34°5′49″N 118°22′04″W		
441	Dunning House (Los Angeles)		May 31, 1989	1606-1616 N. Saint Andrews Pl.; 5552 Carlton Way; 34.1002°N 118.3112°W	Little Armenia	
445	Courtney Desmond Estate		June 20, 1989	1801-1811 Courtney Ave. 34°6′12″N 118°21′27″W	Nichols Canyon	
448	Whitley Court		December 13, 1988	1720-1728 Whitley Ave. 34.1024°N 118.3330°W	Hollywood	Cluster of Spanish Colonial bungalows built from 1903 to 1919 just north of Hollywood Boulevard
453	Artisan's Patio Complex		October 17, 1989	6727-6733 Hollywood Blvd.	Hollywood	
462	American Legion Post 43		November 3, 1989	2035 N. Highland Ave. 34.1077°N 118.3378°W	Hollywood Heights	Neo-Egyptian Legion hall built in 1928, with an interesting history.
463	Afton Arms Apartments		November 3, 1989	6141 Afton Pl. 34°5′44″N 118°19′25″W	Hollywood	
474	Little Nugget		January 26, 1990	5200 Zoo Dr. 34°9′15″N 118°18′28″W	Griffith Park	Dormitory-club lounge rail car built 1937; located at Travel Town in Griffith Park
475	Highland Towers Apartments		October 16, 1990	1920-1928 N. Highland Ave.34.1058°N 118.3372°W		
495	El Capitan Theater Building		June 12, 1990	6834-6838 Hollywood Blvd.	Hollywood	
508	Gilmore Gasoline Service Station		March 23, 1992	6800 Willoughby Ave. & 853-859 N. Highland Ave. 34.0869°N 118.3389°W		Designed by R.J. Kadow in 1935
521	Taggart House		March 15, 1991	2150-2158 Live Oak Dr. & 5423 Black Oak Dr.		design (for mother-in-law) by Lloyd Wright (1920s)
527	Residence at 1437 N. Martel Ave.		April 2, 1991	1437 N. Martel Ave. 34°5′49″N 118°21′02″W		
535	Hollywoodland's Historic Granite Retaining Walls and Stairs		June 11, 1991	Hollywoodland		
545	Hollywood Roosevelt Hotel and Pool		August 13, 1991	7000 Hollywood Blvd. 34°6′04″N 118°20′30″W		
553	Midtown School		November 12, 1991	4155 Russel Ave. 34.1050°N 118.2794°W		School buildings designed by John Lautner, built in 1960.
559	Thirteenth Church of Christ Scientist		April 21, 1992	1748-1780 N. Edgemont St; 34.1035°N 118.2957°W		
563	Headley-Handley House		July 14, 1992	3003 Runyon Canyon Road	Hollywood	Designed by Lloyd Wright (1945), two-story pyramidal shingle roof with low fieldstone walls (remodeled in 1966)
567	Little Country Church of Hollywood		October 2, 1992	1750 N. Argyle Ave. & 6151-61 Carlos Ave.		Destroyed by fire in 2007
572	Hollywood Pacific Theatre		February 9, 1993	6423 Hollywood Blvd. 34°6′07″N 118°19′50″W	Hollywood	Also known as the Warner Brothers Theatre, or Warner Cinerama
579	Wattles Park (Mansion and Gardens)		May 25, 1993	1701-1755 Sierra Bonita/7561 Hollywood Blvd. 34°6′07″N 118°21′14″W	Hollywood	
584	Egyptian Theater and Forecourt Storefronts		September 21, 1993	1650-1654 McCadden Pl.; 6706-6712 Hollywood Blvd. 34°6′03″N 118°20′11″W	Hollywood	
592	Philosophical Research Society		March 3, 1994	3341-3351 Griffith Pk/3910-3918 Los Feliz; 34.1131°N 118.2775°W	Los Feliz	Pre-Columbian style building designed for writer Manly Palmer Hall, founder of the society; Robert Stacy-Judd was principal architect.
593	Max Factor Make-Up Salon		April 26, 1994	1660 N. Highland Ave. 34°6′4″N 118°20′18″W	Hollywood	
597	Raymond Chandler Square		August 5, 1994	Cahuenga Ave. & Hollywood Blvd.	Hollywood	
603	Villa Vallambrosa		September 27, 1994	2074 Watsonia Terrace		
604	Hollywood School for Girls (Women's Club of Hollywood)		November 1, 1994	1741-1751 N. La Brea Ave.		
616	The Trianon and Neon Roof Sign		June 23, 1995	1750-1754 N. Serrano Ave.	Hollywood	Architect Leland Bryant designed the six-story apartment building and neon roof sign in 1928; French-Norman style, with a round, conical-roofed tower, a steep, hipped slate roof, and dormers with narrow windows.
617	Hollywood Pilgrimage Memorial Monument		July 25, 1995	2580 Cahuenga Blvd. 34.113374°N 118.333966°W	Hollywood	Erected in 1923 to the memory of Christine Wetherill Stevenson, a founder of the Hollywood Bowl and John Anson Ford Amphitheatre; steel cross is 32 feet high.
630	Pierson Residence		November 13, 1996	3124 Belden Dr.		Pierpont Davis, Architect
648	Withers Residence		December 9, 1997	2731 Woodshire Dr.		
657	Los Feliz Heights Steps		October 14, 1998	Cromwell Ave. & Bonvue Ave.	Los Feliz	
659	Pacific Cinerama Dome Theatre and Marquee		December 18, 1998	6360 Sunset Blvd. 34°5′51″N 118°19′41″W	Hollywood	
664	Broadway Department Store and Neon Sign		September 29, 1999	6300 W. Hollywood Blvd. 34.1014324°N 118.3270755°W	Hollywood	
665	Hollywood Plaza Hotel and Neon Sign		September 29, 1999	1633 Vine St. 34.1009°N 118.3269°W	Hollywood	Designed by Walker & Eisen (1924) in Renaissance Revival style
666	Taft Building and Neon Sign		September 29, 1999	6280 W. Hollywood Blvd. 34°6′5″N 118°19′35″W	Hollywood	
668	Hillside House by Carl Maston		September 29, 1999	8707 St. Ives Dr.		
670	Stahl House / Case Study House #22		November 9, 1999	1635 Woods Dr.		designed by Pierre Koenig (1960)
673	The Outpost 11		November 17, 1999	1851 Outpost Dr.	Outpost Estates	
674	Jacobson House		February 25, 2000	4520 Dundee Dr.	Los Feliz	Edward H. Fickett, FAIA, architect (1965)
675	Villa Elaine		February 25, 2000	1241-1249 N. Vine St.		
681	S.H. Woodruff Residence		June 14, 2000	3185 N. Durand Dr. 34°7′38″N 118°19′26″W		
687	Tornborg House		October 24, 2000	1918 N. Tamarind Ave. 34°6′21″N 118°19′08″W		
689	Philip Chandler House		February 6, 2001	2531 N. Catalina St. 34°6′54″N 118°17′51″W		
690	Elliot House		February 6, 2001	4237 Newdale Dr. 34°6′22″N 118°16′55″W		designed by Rudolph Schindler (1930)
702	Hewitt Residence		July 31, 2001	1543 N. Curson Ave. 34°5′57″N 118°21′19″W		Japanese Craftsman style bungalow
714	Don Carlos Apartments		April 24, 2002	5226 Hollywood Blvd.		
715	Lehman House		May 15, 2002	2720 Belden Dr.		
733	The Garrick		October 23, 2002	539 N. Sycamore Ave.		
755	Vista Del Mar Steps		June 3, 2003	Vista Del Mar Ave. & Holly Mount Dr.		
762	Sowden House		August 13, 2003	5121 Franklin Ave. 34°6′20″N 118°18′04″W	Los Feliz	designed by Lloyd Wright (1920s)
769	Toberman House		October 29, 2003	1749 Harvard Blvd. 34.1032°N 118.3053°W	Hollywood	Residence built c. 1907 for former mayor James R. Toberman
773	El Cabrillo Apartments		December 16, 2003	1832-1850 Grace Ave. 34°6′18″N 118°19′54″W		
775	El Cadiz Apartments		April 27, 2004	1721 N. Sycamore Ave.		
783	Covert Cottages Bungalow Court		March 24, 2004	938-944 1/2 N. Martel Ave.		
784	Paul Lauritz House		August 10, 2004	3955 Clayton Ave.		
785	Chemosphere House		August 10, 2004	7776 Torreyson Dr. 34°7′39″N 118°22′07″W	Hollywood Hills West	House designed by John Lautner as a residence for Leonard Malin, 1960
799	Chateau Des Fleurs		May 18, 2005	6626 Franklin Ave. 34.1050°N 118.3343°W		1927 apartment building designed by Meyer-Radon Brothers in French Revival (Norman) style.
801	The Courtyard Apartments		June 1, 2005	1570 LaBaig Ave.		
812	Wirin House		July 8, 2005	2622 Glendower Ave.		
816	Nirvana Apartments		July 13, 2005	1775-1781 N. Orange Dr.		
817	La Leyenda Apartments		July 13, 2005	1735-1737 N. Whitley Ave.34.1028°N 118.3336°W		
821	Las Orchidias		September 14, 2005	1903 N. Orchid Ave. 34°6′17″N 118°20′24″W	Hollywood Heights	
822	Hellman House		September 14, 2005	1845 N. Courtney Ave. 34°6′14″N 118°21′31″W		
832	Casa Laguna		January 25, 2006	1885-1883 S. Kingsley Dr.; 5200 W. Franklin Ave. 34.1052°N 118.3039°W	Los Feliz	1928 courtyard apartments
833	Grier House		January 25, 2006	2690 Hollyridge Dr.		
840	Ansalem A. Ernst House		March 17, 2006	5670 Holly Oak Dr.		Designed by Gregory Ain (1937)
842	The Ojai Apartments		May 10, 2006	1929-1933 N. Whitley Ave. 34°6′22″N 118°20′00″W	Whitley Heights	1928 Mediterranean Revival building designed by Frank H. Webster
843	Los Feliz Brown Derby		May 19, 2006	4500 W. Los Feliz Blvd. 34°6′41″N 118°17′15″W	Los Feliz	
846	B.A.G. Fuller House		August 16, 2007	6887 West Alta Loma Terrace; 34°6′36″N 118°20′18″W	Hollywood Heights	
852	Wolff Residence		September 27, 2006	8530 W. Hedges Pl. 34°5′47″N 118°22′41″W	Sunset Hills	designed by John Lautner
857	Capitol Records Tower and Rooftop Sign		November 15, 2006	1740-1750 N. Vine St.; 6236 W. Yucca St. 34°6′11″N 118°19′34″W	Hollywood	designed by Welton Beckett (1956); world's first circular office building
859	Orchard Gabels Cottage		February 6, 2007	6516 W. Fountain Ave.; 1277 North Wilcox Ave.	Hollywood	
867	Mayfair Apartments and Rooftop Neon Sign		April 27, 2007	1760 North Wilcox Ave. 34.1035°N 118.3309°W	Hollywood	Early multi-family building in Hollywood; 4-story Romanesque/Renaissance Revival style apartment was designed by William Allen in 1925.
874	Garber House		June 5, 2007	6060 Scenic Ave. 34°6′36″N 118°19′18″W	Hollywood	
876	Hollywood Professional Building		June 5, 2007	7046 Hollywood Blvd. 34°6′05″N 118°20′34″W	Hollywood	Built in 1925, former home to Ronald Reagan's office as president of the Screen Actor's Guild.
882	The Fontenoy		July 25, 2007	1811 North Whitley Ave. 34°6′12″N 118°20′00″W	Hollywood	1929 Chateauesque apartment building designed by Leland A. Bryant.
896	Harpel House#1		December 5, 2007	7764 W. Torreyson Dr. 34°7′40″N 118°22′03″W	Hollywood	House designed for radio announcer Willis "Bill" Harpel by noted modern architect, John Lautner; foundations of concrete caissons which continue as columns for the roof frame.
912	Bukowski Court		February 26, 2008	5124 W. DeLongpre Ave. 34°5′47″N 118°18′05″W	Hollywood	
913	Blackburn Residence		April 8, 2008	4791 Cromwell Ave. 34°6′45″N 118°17′39″W	Los Feliz	1927, Paul R. Williams
915	Victor Rossetti Residence		April 8, 2008	2188 North Ponet Dr. 34°6′36″N 118°18′31″W	Hollywood	1928, Paul R. Williams
916	Petitfils Residence		April 8, 2008	4519 West Cockerham Dr. 34°6′52″N 118°17′27″W	Hollywood	
921	Yamashiro Restaurant		June 11, 2008	1999 Sycamore Ave. 34°6′21″N 118°20′31″W	Hollywood Heights	To house their priceless collection of Asian treasures, the Bernheimer brothers built this hilltop mansion 250 feet above Hollywood Boulevard in 1914. Now a restaurant.
940	North Vermont Avenue Moreton Bay Fig Trees		January 14, 2009	N. Vermont Ave. between Los Feliz Blvd. and Aberdeen Ave. 34°6′48.77″N 118°17′26.51″W	Los Feliz	Thirty-nine Moreton Bay Figs, planted about 1913, landscape architect Wilbur Cook.
942	Griffith Park		January 27, 2009	34°8′3.39″N 118°17′54.87″W	Los Feliz	"Donated... in 1896 by Griffith J. Griffith... one of the largest urban parks in the nation [at 4,128 acres (16.71 km^{2})]... With more than thirty distinct historically significant features, the park is recognized for its 'wilderness' area, designed landscape, and built environment."
947	CBS Columbia Square Studios		March 10, 2009	6121 Sunset Blvd. 34°5′52.99″N 118°19′21.49″W	Hollywood	International style, 1938, designed by William Lescaze.
956	Villa Bonita		May 13, 2015	1817 N. Hillcrest Rd. 34°6′16.88″N 118°20′22.59″W	Hollywood Heights	Seven-story apartment constructed in 1929.
1088	Equitable Building of Hollywood		May 13, 2015	6253 W. Hollywood Blvd; 34.1020°N 118.3263°W	Hollywood	Gothic Revival and Art Deco high-rise office building built in 1929
1098	Lookout Mountain Air Force Station		February 12, 2015	8935 Wonderland Avenue; 34.108810°N 118.388588°W	Hollywood	Former USAF installation producing film media for the United States Department of Defense and the Atomic Energy Commission from 1947 to 1969
1114	Redwine Building		May 18, 2016	1618 North Las Palmas Ave; 34.1005°N 118.3359°W	Hollywood	Office building designed by Richard Douglas King for attorney Hiram G. Redwine and built in 1931
1136	Earl Carroll Theater	Earl Carroll Theater	December 7, 2016	6230 Sunset Blvd. 34.097851°N 118.325321°W	Hollywood	Landmark theater on Sunset Blvd.
1158	Musicians Union of Hollywood		March 23, 2018	807-831 North Vine Street, 808-820 Lillian Way, and 5901 West Waring Avenue; 34.0857°N 118.3268°W	Hollywood	Corporate International commercial building that housed the Musicians Union of Los Angeles from 1950 to 2017
1169	The Montecito		November 21, 2018	6650-6668 West Franklin Ave. and 1855 North Cherokee Dr. 34°6′18″N 118°20′3″W	Hollywood	Art Deco apartment building home to Hollywood celebrities, including James Cagney, Mickey Rooney, Montgomery Clift and Ronald Reagan; later converted to low-income housing for senior citizens
1173	Hollywood Citizen-News Building		December 5, 2018	1545-1551 North Wilcox Ave. 34.0996°N 118.3312°W	Hollywood	Art Deco commercial building that housed Hollywood Citizen-News from 1931 to 1970
1175	Community Laundry Company Building		February 6, 2019	900-930 North Highland Avenue. 34.0874°N 118.3379°W	Hollywood	Mayan Revival building built in 1927.
1181	Agfa Ansco Corporation Building		May 12, 2019	6424 West Santa Monica Blvd. 34.0907°N 118.3297°W	Hollywood	Art Deco commercial building formerly home to Agfa Ansco Corporation
1196	Fred C. Thomson Building		November 5, 2019	6528 Sunset Blvd. 34.0979°N 118.3326°W	Hollywood	Retail building designed by Gogerty and Weyl for Fred Thomson and Frances Marion. Later owned by Edgar Bergen who broadcast The Charlie McCarthy Show from the building.
1202	Hollywood Art Center School		January 14, 2020	2025-2027 N Highland Ave. 34.1073°N 118.3383°W	Hollywood Heights	Originally built in 1904 for artist Otto Classen as his residence and art studio, the estate was designed by Dennis & Farwell. Hollywood Art Center School operated here from 1947 to 2000.
1268	Hollywood Home Savings and Loan		September 21, 2022	1500-1518 N. Vine Street; 34.0985°N 118.3262°W	Hollywood	
1292	Hollywood Sikh Temple		August 9, 2023	1966 N Vermont Avenue and 4624-4636 W. Finley Avenue; 34.108°N 118.292°W	Los Feliz	Originally built as a single-family residence in a 1913, the building was converted to a hotel and restaurant in 1938, converted again to the first Hollywood Sikh Temple in 1969, and demolished to make way for a larger temple in 1986. The second, larger temple opened in 1996.
1295	The Complex (Hollywood)		December 1, 2023	6464-6480 Santa Monica Blvd. 34.0906°N 118.3307°W	Hollywood	Spanish Colonial Revival building built in 1928.
1302	Yucca Vine Tower		May 31, 2024	1801-1805 N Vine Street and 6301-6317 W Yucca Street; 34.104°N 118.327°W	Hollywood	Includes the exterior of the property and interior features dating from the original 1929 construction and excluding any later interior alterations
1320	Amasis Apartments		April 2, 2025	747 North Wilcox Avenue; 34.0850°N 118.3313°W	Hollywood	Egyptian Revival apartment building built in 1926
1325	Hollywood Premiere Motel		July 30, 2025	5329-5337 W. Hollywood Boulevard and 1716-1718 N. Serrano Avenue; 34.10204°N 118.30694°W	Hollywood	Mid-century Modern motel built in 1960

== Non-HCM historic sites recognized by state and/or nation ==
Code	Landmark name	Image	Date designated	Locality	Neighborhood	Description
1004 (CHL 554)	Cecil B. De Mille Studio Barn (Paramount Studios)			2112 N. Las Palmas Ave. 34°6′30″N 118°20′10″W	Hollywood	
1030	Hollywood Palladium			6201 W. Sunset Blvd. 34°5′53″N 118°19′27″W	Hollywood	
2178	Hollywood Bowl			2301 N. Highland Ave. 34°6′45″N 118°20′19″W	Hollywood	designs by Lloyd Wright, Frank Gehry
2196	Whitley Heights Historic District		August 19, 1982	Roughly bounded by Franklin, Highland, Cahuenga, and Fairfield Aves. 34°6′27″N 118°20′3″W	Whitley Heights	Developed in 1920s in hills above Hollywood; once home to celebrities including Rudolph Valentino, Jean Harlow, Charlie Chaplin, Bette Davis, W.C. Fields and Gloria Swanson
2246	Arthur Murray Studio building			7024 Hollywood Blvd.	Hollywood	Renamed Johnny Grant Building in 1995
2303	U.S. Post Office – Hollywood Station		January 11, 1985	1615 North Wilcox Ave. 34°6′0″N 118°19′50″W	Hollywood	WPA commissioned art deco Post Office Building; designed by Claud Beelman in 1937; dead letter repository for love letters to such Hollywood luminaries as Clark Gable, Judy Garland, and others
2308	Hollywood Boulevard Commercial and Entertainment District	Hollywood Boulevard as taken from the Kodak Theatre	April 4, 1985	6200-7000 Hollywood Blvd., N. Vine St., N. Highland Ave. and N. Ivar St. 34°6′5″N 118°20′2″W	Hollywood	Landmarks include: Grauman's Chinese and Egyptian Theatres, Pantages Theatre, Warner Theatre, El Capitan Theatre, Taft Building, Shane Building, Baine Building, Janes House, Hollywood First National, Hollywood Plaza Hotel, Hollywood Roosevelt Hotel, Hollywood Masonic Temple, Security Trust and Savings
2382	La Belle Tour		January 22, 1988	6200 Franklin Ave. 34°6′19″N 118°19′24″W	Hollywood	Apartment building in Hollywood; known for many years as "Hollywood Tower"
2444	Precision Auto Repair			5618-5630 Hollywood Blvd.	Hollywood	
2453	Franklin Townhouses			1852 Gramercy Pl. & 5620-5640 Franklin Ave.	Hollywood	
2462	Toberman Storage Company (Bekins Van and Storage)			1025 N. Highland Ave.	Hollywood	
2463	Residence at 637-657 N. Highland Avenue			637-657 N. Highland Ave.	Hollywood	
2464	Hollywood YMCA			1541-1553 N. Hudson Ave.; 6550-6600 Selma Ave.	Hollywood	
2465	I. Magnin & Company (Platos Retreat West)			1560-1660 N. Ivar Ave.; 6336-6340 Hollywood Blvd.	Hollywood	
2466	Atkinson-Farnum-Swain Residence			2003 N. La Brea Terrace	Hollywood	Built by Dustin Farnum; home of Mark Hellinger; longtime home of Gail Patrick; purchased in 1986 by Taylor Hackford and Helen Mirren
2470	Nicholas Priester Building			1103-1109 Vermont Ave.; 4701 Santa Monica Blvd.	Hollywood	
2471	Hollywood Presbyterian Medical Center			1300-1322 N. Vermont Ave.; 4557-4617 Fountain; 34°5′47″N 118°17′28″W	Hollywood	
2703	St. Andrews Bungalow Court			1514-1544 N. St. Andrews Pl.	Hollywood	
2707	Hollywood Forever Cemetery			6000 Santa Monica Blvd. 34°5′20″N 118°19′09″W	Hollywood	'celebrity cemetery'

== See also ==
- Bibliography of Los Angeles
- Outline of the history of Los Angeles
- Bibliography of California history

=== Lists of L.A. Historic-Cultural Monuments ===
- Historic-Cultural Monuments in Downtown Los Angeles
- Historic-Cultural Monuments on the East and Northeast Sides
- Historic-Cultural Monuments in the Harbor area
- Historic-Cultural Monuments in the San Fernando Valley
- Historic-Cultural Monuments in Silver Lake, Angelino Heights, and Echo Park
- Historic-Cultural Monuments in South Los Angeles
- Historic-Cultural Monuments on the Westside
- Historic-Cultural Monuments in the Wilshire and Westlake areas
