= Hollywood Cross =

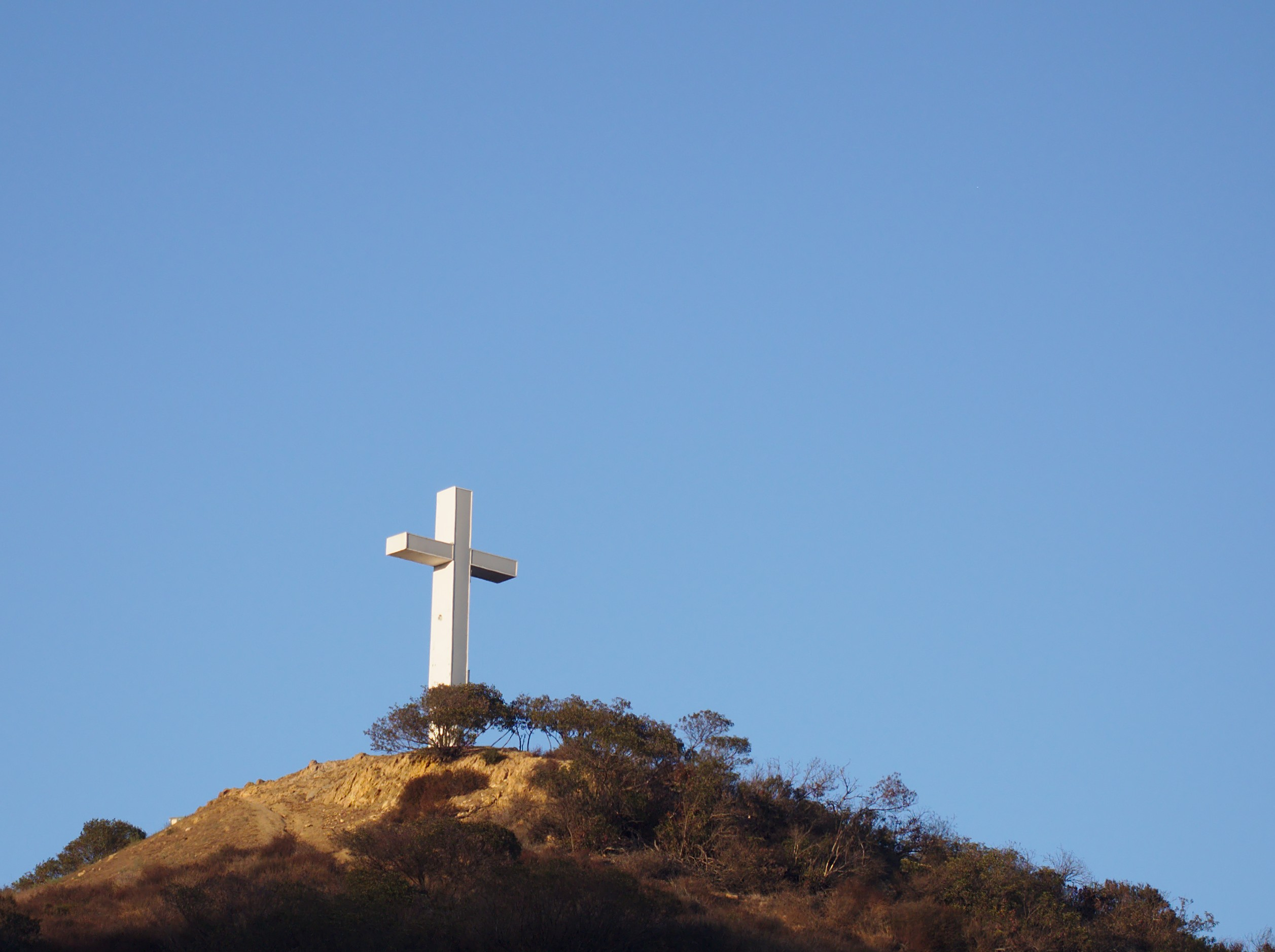

- Location within the Los Angeles metropolitan area
- 34°06′48″N 118°20′02″W
- Location: 2580 Cahuenga Blvd., Los Angeles, California

History
- Built: 1923

Site notes
- Governing body: Private

Los Angeles Historic-Cultural Monument
- Designated: 1995
- Reference no.: 617

The Hollywood Cross, officially known as the Hollywood Pilgrimage Memorial Monument, is a 32-foot-tall steel Christian cross situated above the John Anson Ford Amphitheatre in the Hollywood Hills neighborhood of Los Angeles, California. Overlooking the Cahuenga Pass, the Hollywood Freeway, and the Hollywood Bowl, it serves as a prominent landmark with significant historical and cultural relevance.

Originally erected as a memorial for Christine Wetherill Stevenson, it is owned and maintained by The Church on the Way in Van Nuys.

== Historical background ==
Erected in 1923, the original cross was a wooden structure built as a memorial to Christine Wetherill Stevenson, a philanthropist and founder of the Pilgrimage Theatre—now known as the Ford Amphitheatre. Stevenson was instrumental in producing “The Pilgrimage Play,” a dramatization of the life of Jesus, performed at the amphitheater. The illuminated cross complemented these performances, symbolizing the play’s religious themes.

== Structural evolution ==
The initial wooden cross stood until the early 1980s when it fell into disrepair and was subsequently demolished. In the late 1980s, a new cross was constructed using remnants of the original structure left on the hill. This iteration was later replaced in 1993 by the current steel and opaque plastic monument, known as the Hollywood Pilgrimage Memorial Monument. In 1995, it was designated Los Angeles Historic-Cultural Monument #617.

== Cultural significance ==
The Hollywood Cross has survived various challenges, including vandalism, natural disasters, and legal disputes. The cross was highlighted in the 2024 documentary “A Light in the Darkness,” which chronicles the monument’s 100-year history and its role in the cultural landscape of Hollywood.

== See also ==
- Los Angeles Historic-Cultural Monuments in Hollywood
