= Garden Court Apartments =

Garden Court Apartments may refer to:

- Garden Court Apartments (Los Angeles, California)
- Garden Court Apartments (Detroit, Michigan)
