= Milton J. Black =

American architect

- Born: April 23, 1905; California
- Died: June 30, 1970 (aged 65); San Diego County, California
- Occupation: Architect
- Buildings: El Cadiz Apartments; Tail o' the Pup

Milton J. Black (April 23, 1905 – June 30, 1970) was an American architect known for his work in Los Angeles, California.

== Biography ==
Milton J. Black was born in California on April 23, 1905.

Black was best known for the Spanish Colonial Revival and Streamline Moderne buildings he designed in Los Angeles in the 1920s and 1930s. He partnered with J. Ross Castendyck c. 1928 and was granted his own certificate to practice architecture in California in 1930. Most of his work was residential and according to the City of Los Angeles ranged “from the masterful to the mundane”.

Black died in San Diego County, California on June 30, 1970.

== List of works ==
Notable Black works include (all in Los Angeles):

- Lewis Apartments (1929)
- Dolores del Rio Residence interior design (1929), LAHCM No. 1242
- Delta Sigma Phi Fraternity House, UCLA Fraternity Row (1930)
- Residence at 5055 N. Hood Dr. (1930)
- 654 Burnside Apartments (1933), LAHCM No. 426
- Mauretania Apartments (1934)
- Chateau Rossmore (1934)
- J. H. Irvin Apartments (1936)
- Ulm House (1937)
- El Cadiz Apartments (1937), LAHCM No. 775
- Tail o' the Pup (1938)
- 462 S. Cochran Avenue Apartments (1938)
- Cernitz House (1938)
- Westwood-Ambassador Apartments (1940)
- Richardson Apartments (1940), LAHCM No. 847

== See also ==
- List of American architects
- List of people from Los Angeles
