= Jardinette Apartments =

- U.S. National Register of Historic Places
- Los Angeles Historic-Cultural Monument
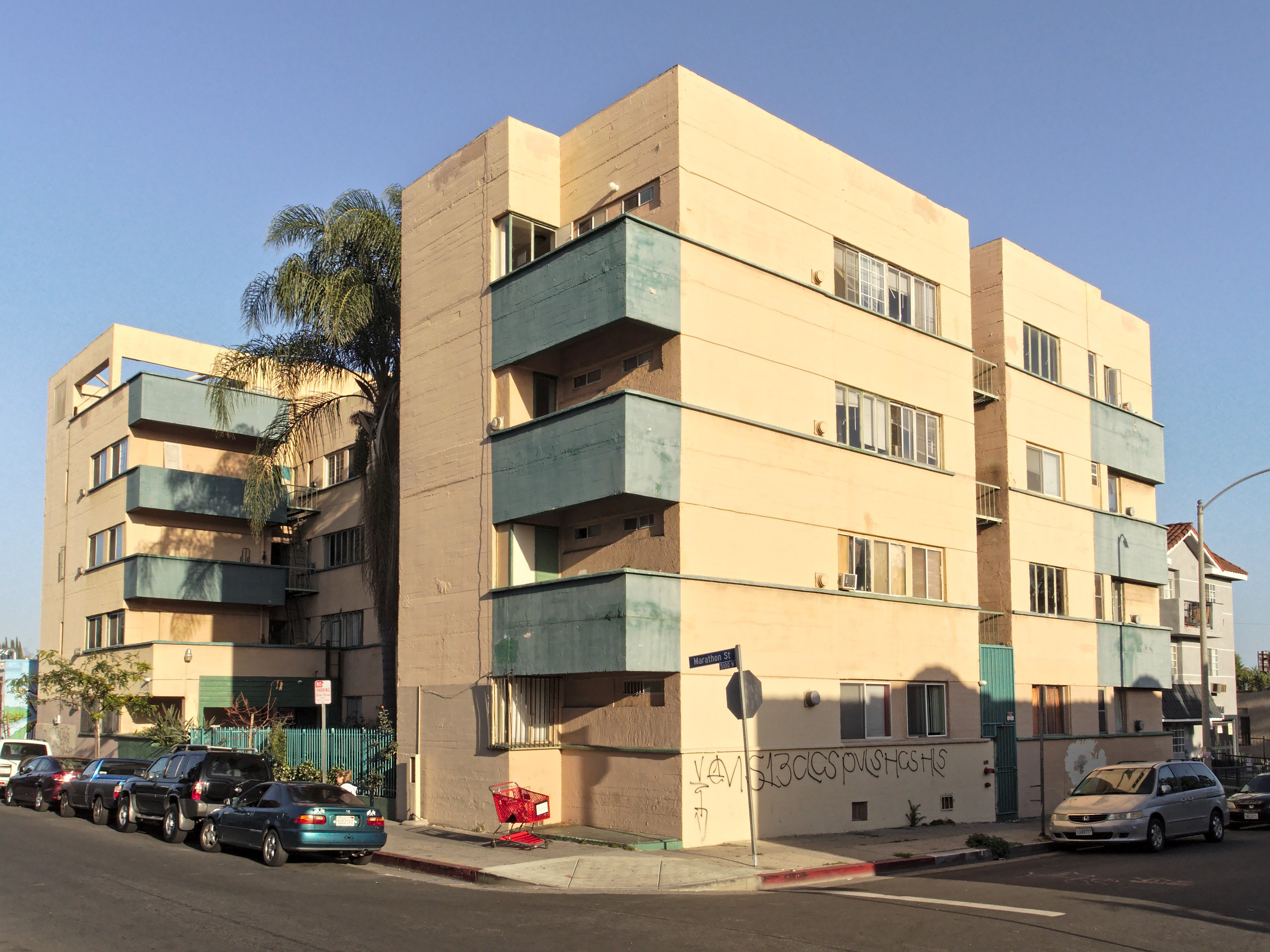
- Jardinette (now Marathon) Apartments, May 2015

- Location within the Los Angeles metropolitan area Location within California Location within the United States
- Location: 5128 Marathon St., Los Angeles, California 90038
- Coordinates: 34.0847°N 118.3100°W
- Built: 1928
- Architect: Neutra, Richard J.; State Construction Co.
- Architectural style: International Style
- NRHP reference No.: 86003524
- LAHCM No.: 390

Significant dates
- Added to NRHP: December 29, 1986
- Designated LAHCM: October 4, 1988

Jardinette Apartments, now known as Marathon Apartments, is a four-story apartment building in Hollywood, Los Angeles, California, designed by modernist Richard Neutra. It was Neutra's first commission in the United States. In his book Key Buildings of the Twentieth Century, Richard Weston called the Jardinette Apartments "one of the first Modernist buildings in America." It has also been called "America's first multi-family, International-style building."

== Construction ==
The construction of the building was announced in a November 1927 article in the Los Angeles Times: "The Jardinette, a Class B apartment-house now under construction at Marathon street and Manhattan Place, is being erected on a site 71 by 130 feet. This house will contain forty-three apartments and will be built at an estimated cost of $225,000." The site is one block west of Western Avenue, and one block north of Melrose Avenue.

While the building was being constructed, architect Harwell Hamilton Harris saw it and found it "unlike any building he had ever seen." It reminded him of expressionism and its reinforced concrete frame, continuous ribbon windows and cantilevered balconies intrigued Harris so much that he sought out the architect, with whom he would become friends.

== Critical reception ==
When the Jardinette was completed in 1928, the building drew widespread attention for its radical modern design. The Christian Science Monitor said: "The new garden apartments bridge a gap between the worker's place of business and his home. Light and sunshine flood the apartment house and create a new harmony of family life and contentment, with every room as efficiently planned for service as the most modern business office." The building was published as far as Germany and Russia. The Los Angeles Times featured the Jardinette in a 1929 article on the "New Art" of architecture in Los Angeles. At the Museum of Modern Art's famed 1932 exhibition entitled "Modern Architecture," Neutra's Jardinette Apartments was one of the few American examples included in the exhibition.

== Design ==
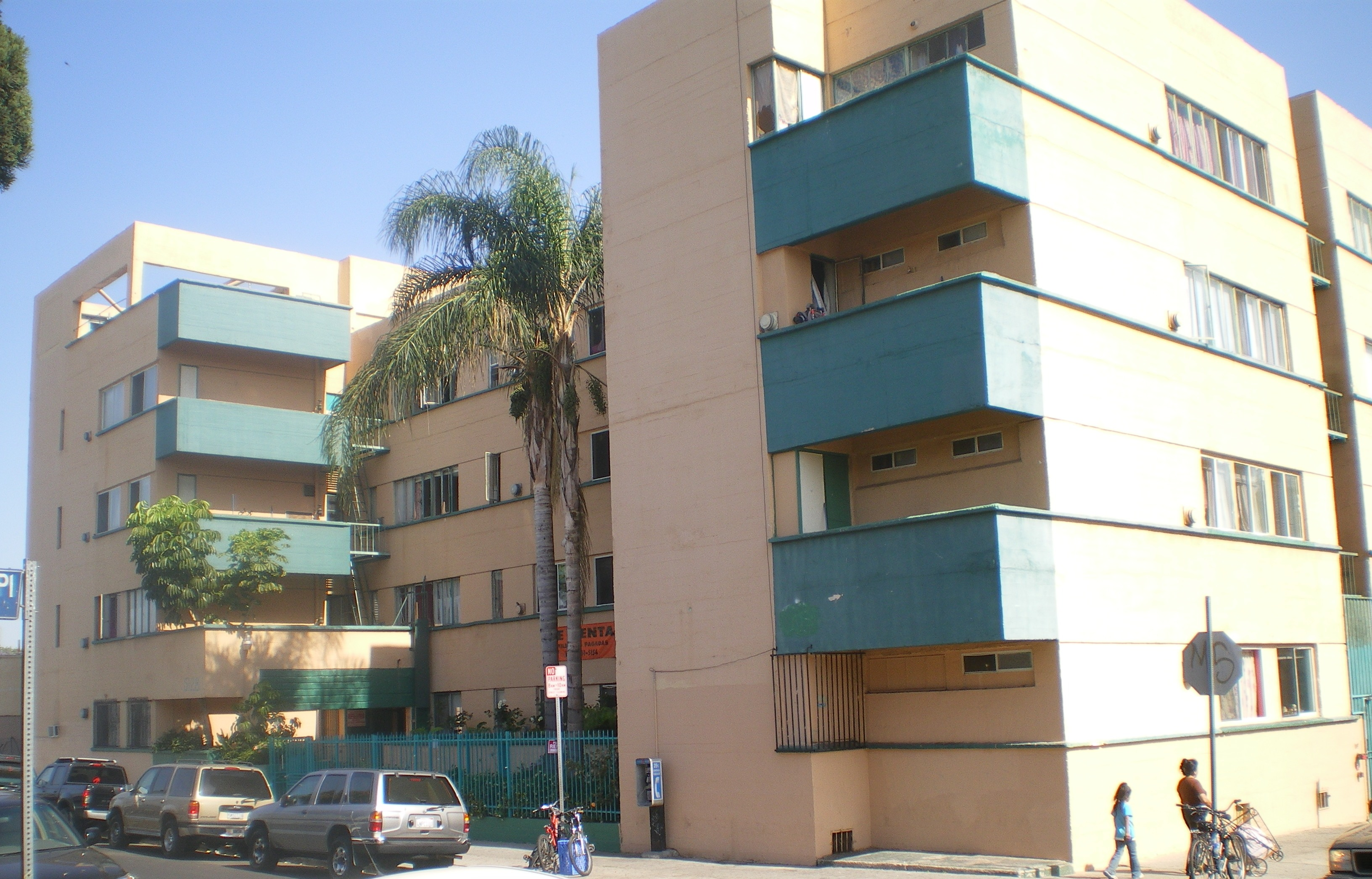
Jardinette in May 2008

The Jardinette building was Neutra's first commission in Los Angeles. Like the Lovell House, which Neutra designed around the same time, the Jardinette is composed of "box-like forms, flat roofs, unbroken horizontal windows alternating with plain, banded spandrels extended to form balconies." However, Jardinette differs from Lovell House in construction. Neutra chose reinforced concrete for Jardinette, with long spans of reinforced concrete allowing for unbroken window strips. The original design also included rooftop gardens.

The building's main structure runs east to west along the back of the site, with two short wings at either end forming a shallow courtyard. The design was intended to convey a sense of openness: "Everything about the building speaks of condensed, efficient forms whose edges dissolve into the landscape." A writer for Art and Culture noted, "The Jardinette is a perfect example of the Modernist trend at the time."

The Jardinette was intended as a prototype for a series of garden apartments to be built in Hollywood. However, the developer, Joseph H. Miller, went bankrupt during the construction of Jardinette, and the other buildings were never realized.

One of the key features that set the Jardinette apart from other apartment buildings built in Los Angeles in the 1920s was the lack of ornamentation. The Los Angeles Times has written that the Jardinette represents the roots of Neutra's radical, free-form style. "This was radical architecture. It was without ornament, made out of industrial materials, and bold in its sculptural openness. Areas flowed from inside to outside, and glass made the artificially lush landscape of California seem to float into the very heart of each of the architect's buildings."

== Later decline ==
By the early 1990s, the Jardinette has fallen into a state of neglect; a 1992 Los Angeles Times article noted that it was: "… somewhat neglected and forlorn … One can only hope that someday soon the Jardinette, inhabited by mere mortals who enjoy efficiency and sunlight, will be restored to its original abstract splendor." In 2005, the LA Weekly described the building as a "depressing" complex and suggested that its residents "may never guess that their cellblock-like building on a dismal and forsaken street is a landmark of modernism."

== Renovation ==
In 2016, the building's owner Robert Clippinger began historic renovations of the Jardinette Apartments. However, after incurring severe cost overruns and construction delays during the renovation process, the apartments were sold to local developer Cameron Hassid in December 2020. Hassid continued the redevelopment process, with the goal of retaining as much of the building's original architectural features as possible. The historical renovation was challenging as the building had fallen into a state of neglect and disrepair, and the apartment units had been modified by tenants and previous owners. With the help of architectural historian and consultant Barbara Lamprecht, Los Angeles historical architect and Mills Act administrator Lambert Gessinger, architect Corey Miller, and land-use consultant Michael Norberg, the apartments were successfully renovated and completed in 2026, at a cost of more than 5 million dollars. The Mills Act allowed the team to complete the project with some tax exemptions, as the Jardinette was a historical landmark.

The renovations preserved as much of the building's original modernist characteristics as possible, including the steel-casement windows, exterior color scheme, skylights, apartment layouts, interior finishings, and interior stucco walls. The central garden was also retained during the renovation (for which the apartment bears its name, Jardinette meaning "little garden"). Modern enhancements included seismic reinforcements, fire sprinklers, air conditioning and modern ventilation, electrical wiring, and plumbing upgrades. These enhancements were subtly and seamlessly integrated into the apartments with the goal of best preserving the original design features.

As of April 2026, the newly restored Jardinette is soon planning to accept tenants.

== Historic designations ==
- In 1986, the Jardinette was listed in the National Register of Historic Places.
- In 1986, the Jardinette was registered with the State of California's Office of Historic Preservation.
- In 1988, the Jardinette was designated as a Historic-Cultural Landmark by the City of Los Angeles.

== See also ==
- Los Angeles Historic-Cultural Monuments in Hollywood
- List of Registered Historic Places in Los Angeles
