= Fox Theater (Hollywood, California) =

Former movie theater in Hollywood, Los Angeles

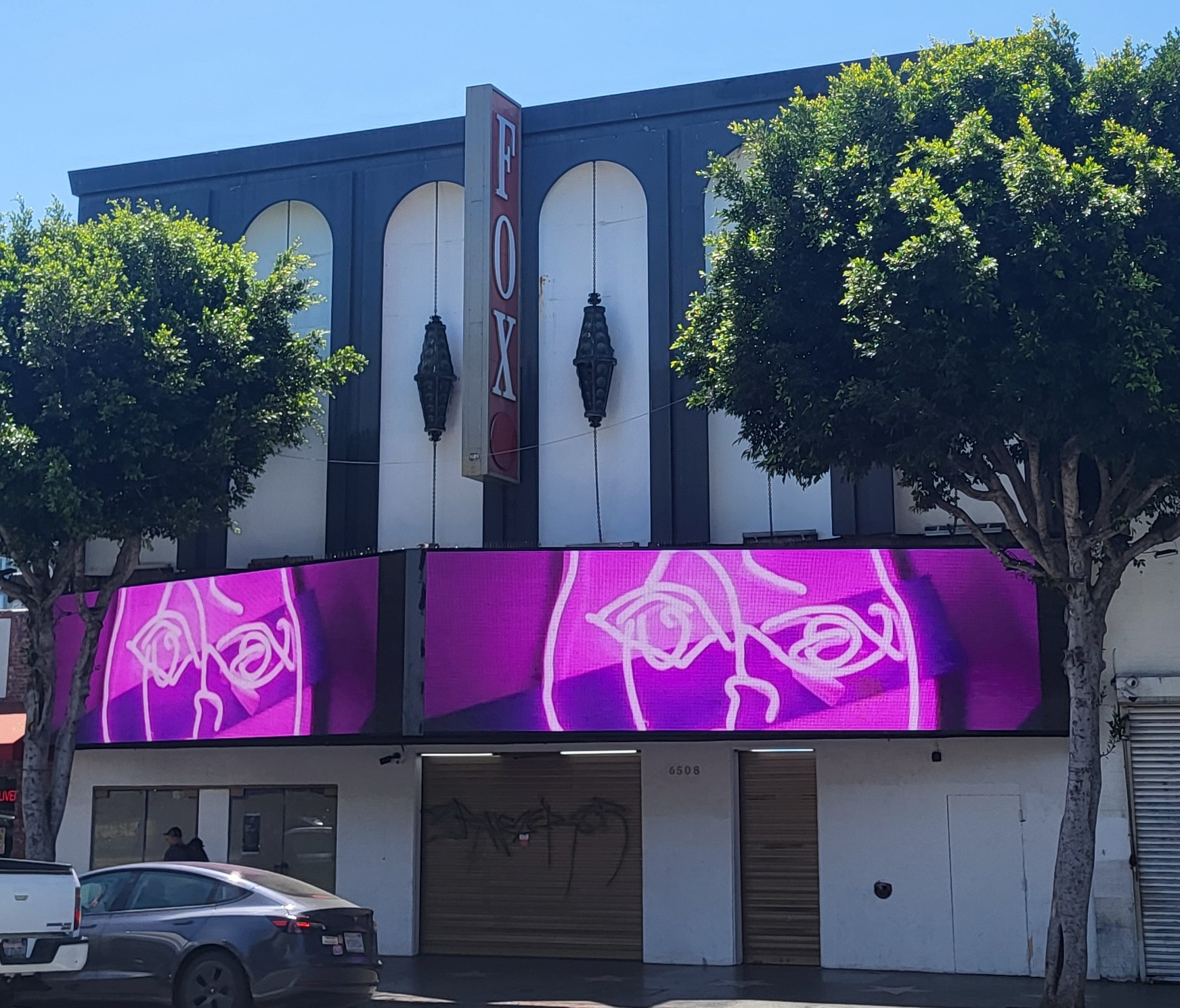
- The building in 2024
- Interactive map of Fox Theater
- Former names: Iris Theatre (1918–1965); Playhouse Hollywood (2009–2020)
- Address: 6508 Hollywood Boulevard, Hollywood, California
- Coordinates: 34.101°N 118.331°W
- Capacity: 800 or 1000
- Type: Indoor movie theater later converted to a lounge/club

Construction
- Opened: 1918
- Renovated: 1934, 1969, 2009
- Closed: 1994, 2020
- Years active: 1918-1994, 2009-2020
- Architects: Frank Meline, S. Charles Lee

Hollywood's Fox Theater, formerly Iris Theatre, was a historic movie theater located at 6508 W. Hollywood Boulevard in Hollywood, California.

== History ==
The theater that would become Fox Theater opened as Iris Theatre in 1918, after that theater relocated from 6415 to 6508 Hollywood Boulevard. The new theater, built in the Romanesque style by Frank Meline for P. Tabor, sat 800 or 1000 and was the second movie theater on Hollywood Blvd. Construction costs were "something like $20,000" ($428,097 in 2025). The theater was sold by Frank Alexander to J. B. Zeller the year after construction was completed. Isabelle Townsend owned the building at the time.

In 1934, Iris Theatre was redesigned in the Art Deco style by S. Charles Lee. It was remodeled again in 1955, and also was upgraded to show Cinemascope, 3D, VistaVision, and stereophonic sound. Fox Theaters took over in 1965, after which they renamed the theater Fox Theater, and in 1969 they remodeled the building once again.

In the 1950s, Carol Burnett worked as an usher in this theater after being fired from Hollywood Pacific Theater across the street. In 1960, when the Hollywood Walk of Fame was unveiled, Psycho was playing in this theater, and as a tribute Alfred Hitchcock's star was placed outside.

In 1985, the Hollywood Boulevard Commercial and Entertainment District was added to the National Register of Historic Places, and while this theater was not listed as a contributing or non-contributing property, "Iris" was mentioned as one of the theaters that "created an aura of fantasy for the population of the area — and satisfied the tourists in search of "Hollywood" as well".

Last operated by Mann Theatres, Fox Theater closed in 1994 due to damage from the Northridge earthquake. In 2009, the theater was converted into a lounge/club named Playhouse Hollywood, which itself closed in 2020 due to the COVID-19 pandemic.
