= Whitley Court =

- U.S. National Register of Historic Places
- Los Angeles Historic-Cultural Monument
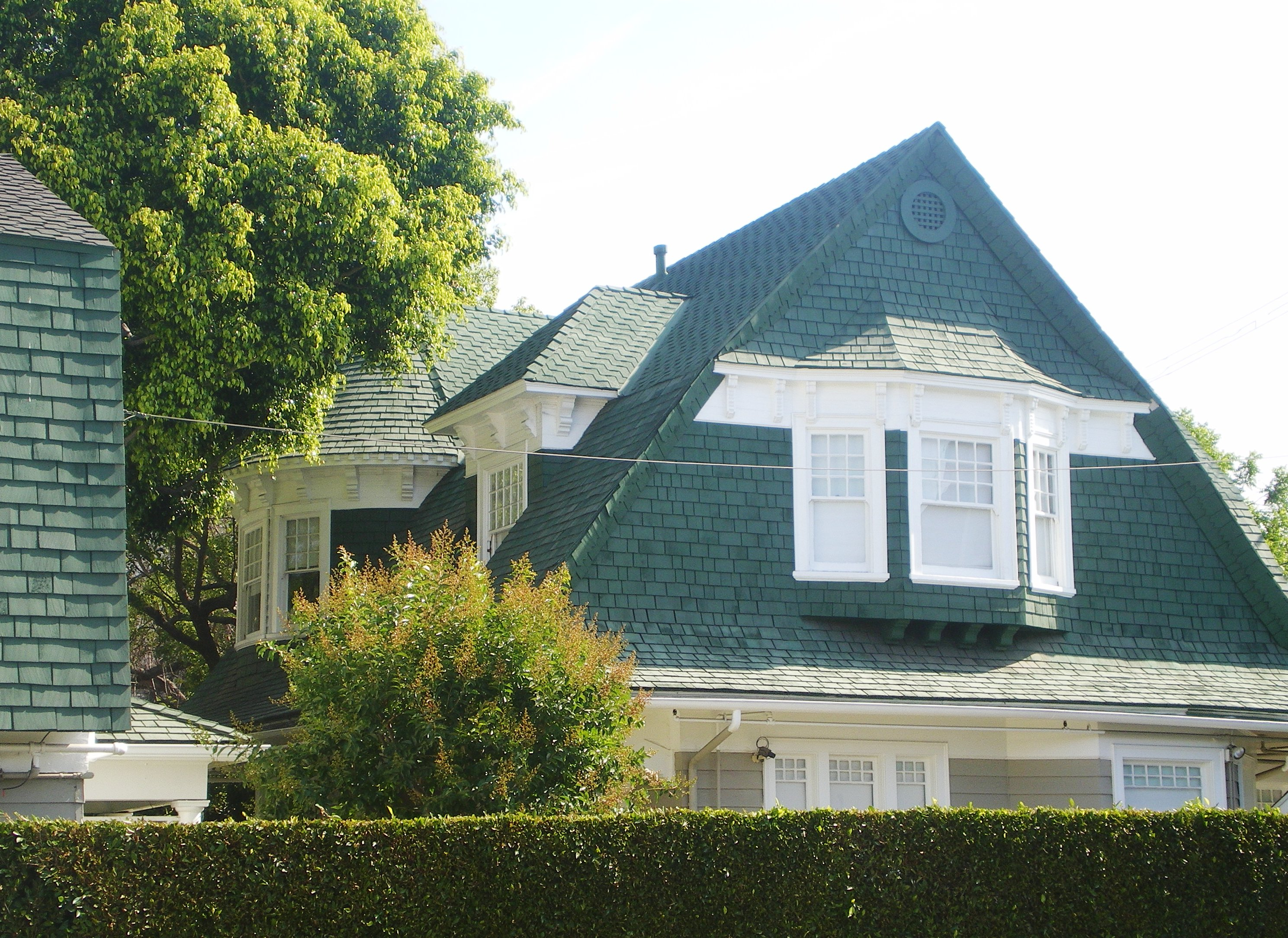
- Original 1903 structure, now located at the rear of the lot

- Location within the Los Angeles metropolitan area Location within California Location within the United States
- Location: 1720-1728½ Whitley Ave., Hollywood, Los Angeles, California
- Coordinates: 34°6′8.7″N 118°19′58.5″W
- Built: 1903
- Architectural style: Queen Anne, Colonial Revival
- NRHP reference No.: 04000732
- LAHCM No.: 448

Significant dates
- Added to NRHP: July 28, 2004
- Designated LAHCM: December 13, 1988

Whitley Court is a cluster of Spanish Colonial bungalows built from 1903 to 1919 just north of Hollywood Boulevard in Hollywood, Los Angeles, California.

The first structure, built in 1903, was a two-story Colonial Revival house with a round bay turret designed by Dennis & Farwell for the Whitley family. The original house was moved to the back of the property to make room for four additional two-story residential buildings. The buildings provided housing for those employed in the booming film industry, and its residents are rumored to have included Theda Bara in the 1920s and Sylvia Sidney in the 1930s.

In 1974, the buildings were converted to a mix of residential and office space. During the 1992 Los Angeles riots, fires burned just 150 feet from Whitley Court, but residents protected the structures with hoses. At the time, one of the owners said, "These buildings are important. You can't replace a historic building. When it burns, you lose it forever."

Whitley Court was designated a Historic Cultural Monument (HCM #448) by the Los Angeles Cultural Heritage Commission in 1988, and was listed in the National Register of Historic Places in 2004.

== See also ==
- Los Angeles Historic-Cultural Monuments in Hollywood
- List of Registered Historic Places in Los Angeles
