= Johnny Grant Building =

Building in Los Angeles, California, U.S.

- U.S. Historic district – Contributing property
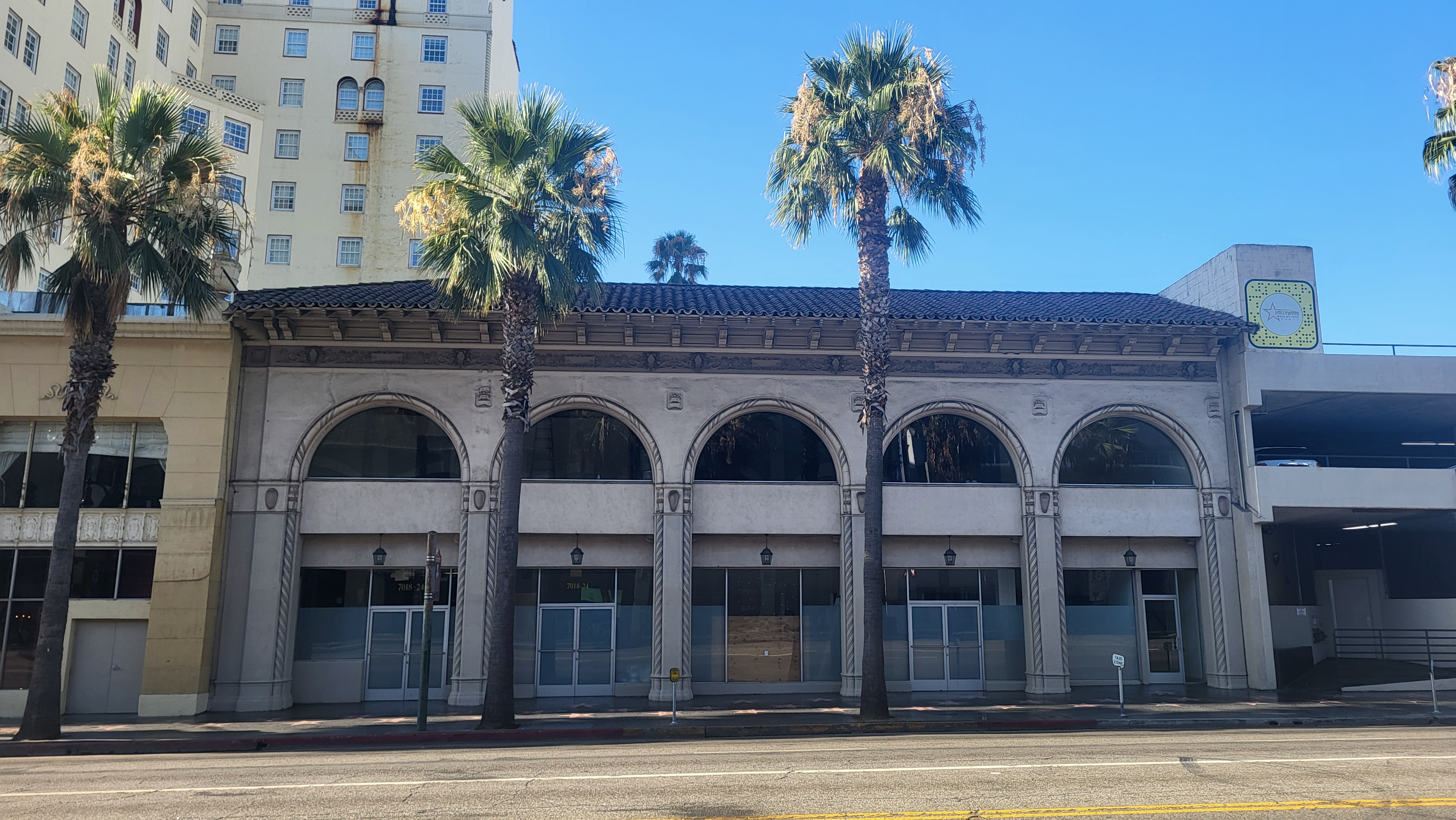
- Johnny Grant Building in 2024

- Location within the Los Angeles metropolitan area
- Location: 7024 W. Hollywood Blvd., Hollywood, California
- Coordinates: 34.1014°N 118.3422°W
- Built: 1919
- Architect: Frank Meline
- Architectural style: Renaissance Revival
- Part of: Hollywood Boulevard Commercial and Entertainment District (ID85000704)
- Designated CP: April 4, 1985

Johnny Grant Building, also known as Arthur Murray, is a historic two-story building located at 7024 W. Hollywood Boulevard in Hollywood, California. It was formerly home to a Arthur Murray Dance Studio and is currently part of the Hollywood Roosevelt Hotel complex.

== History ==
The building that would become the Johnny Grant Building was built in 1919 by Frank Meline, the same architect responsible for the Garden Court Apartments that once stood nearby. Upon opening, this building's second-floor housed Meglin Dance Studio and later an Arthur Murray Dance Studio, with the building sometimes called Arthur Murray due to its second second-floor tenant. Gypsy Rose Lee rehearsed in this studio in the 1930s while performing in downtown's Paramount Theatre.

In 1985, the Hollywood Boulevard Commercial and Entertainment District was added to the National Register of Historic Places, with Arthur Murray listed as a contributing property in the district.

In 1995, the building was named Johnny Grant Building in honor of Hollywood's longtime honorary mayor, Walk of Fame chairman, and good will ambassador Johnny Grant.

== Architecture and design ==
Johnny Grant Building was constructed of wood and designed in the Renaissance Revival style. The building features a red tiled roof, stone detailing, and six second-story arched windows.

== See also ==
- List of contributing properties in the Hollywood Boulevard Commercial and Entertainment District
