= Woodley Theatre =

Former movie theater in Los Angeles, California

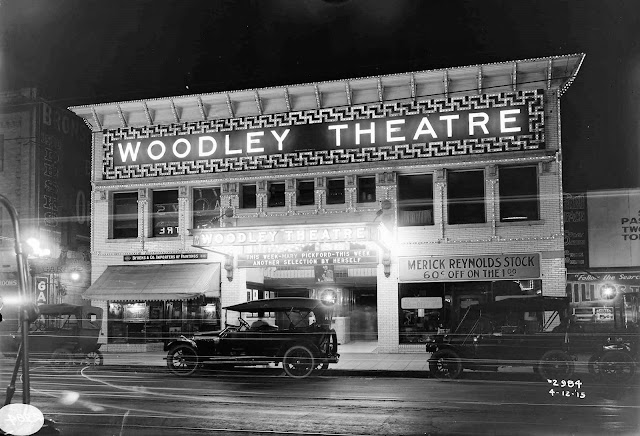
- The theater in 1915
- Interactive map of Woodley Theatre
- Address: 838—840 South Broadway, Los Angeles
- Coordinates: 34.0429°N 118.2552°W
- Capacity: 900
- Type: vaudeville and movie theater
- Screen: 1

Construction
- Opened: 1913
- Renovated: 1920
- Closed: 1925
- Demolished: 1925
- Architects: Train and Williams (1913); Frank Meline Company (1920)

Woodley Theatre, later Sennett Theatre, Victory Theatre, and Mission Theatre, was a vaudeville and movie theater located at 838—840 South Broadway in downtown Los Angeles. Upon opening, the Los Angeles Times described it as "perhaps the best moving picture house, not only in Los Angeles, but in the United States."

== History ==
Woodley Theatre was designed by Train and Williams for Robert W. Woodley and built by the Los Angeles Investment Company's construction department in 1913. Located across the street from Majestic Theatre and Tally's Broadway, this theater was designed for vaudeville and movies, sat 900, and upon opening was described as "perhaps the best moving picture house, not only in Los Angeles, but in the United States." Its opening night screening was a double feature consisting of Dr. Nicholson and the Blue Diamond and Never Again.

The theater was referred to as Woodley Theater until at least 1917. In 1917, Mack Sennett acquired the theater and renamed it Sennett Theater; the following year, the theater was renamed Victory Theatre. Then, in 1920, it was sold, re-constructed, and renamed Mission Theatre. The re-construction was designed and built by Frank Meline Company and the total cost, including the purchase of the theater, was $750,000 ($12.1 million in 2025). The theater's first screening after re-opening was The Mark of Zorro.

The theater closed in 1925; its last showing was a double feature consisting of The Tie That Binds and The Printer's Devil. The theater was demolished soon after and replaced by Orpheum Theater, which opened the following year.

== Architecture and design ==
Woodley Theatre was two-stories tall and originally featured a colonial architecture facade illuminated by 120 electric lamps in a variety of colors. The theater's entrance was finished in Mexican onyx and mahogany.

In 1920, the theater was re-designed in the Mission Revival style, complete with ornamental iron work and an iron marquee that extended the entire front of the building. The new facade was constructed of stone and colored plaster. The new lobby occupied the full width of the building and featured a high vaulted ceiling. Box offices were located at each end and the lobby also featured an Aztec fountain with colored lighting effects.

The auditorium was 100 by 60 feet (30 m × 18 m) and lit by a great shaft tube to prevent glare; it was the first movie theater in Los Angeles to be lit this way. It featured an all music organ and was also equipped with a full orchestra. The seats were made of leather and the theater also featured loges and sidewall seats, all of which were divans. The auditorium's stage was enlarged during the theater's 1920 re-construction; additionally, a new $50,000 ($803,571 in 2025) organ replaced the original and a 35-foot (11 m) wide pool with cascades of water flowing over glass backlit by colored lights was added to the front of the auditorium.
