= Tail o' the Pup =

Hot dog stand in Los Angeles, California

Coordinates: 34.0773°N 118.3798°W

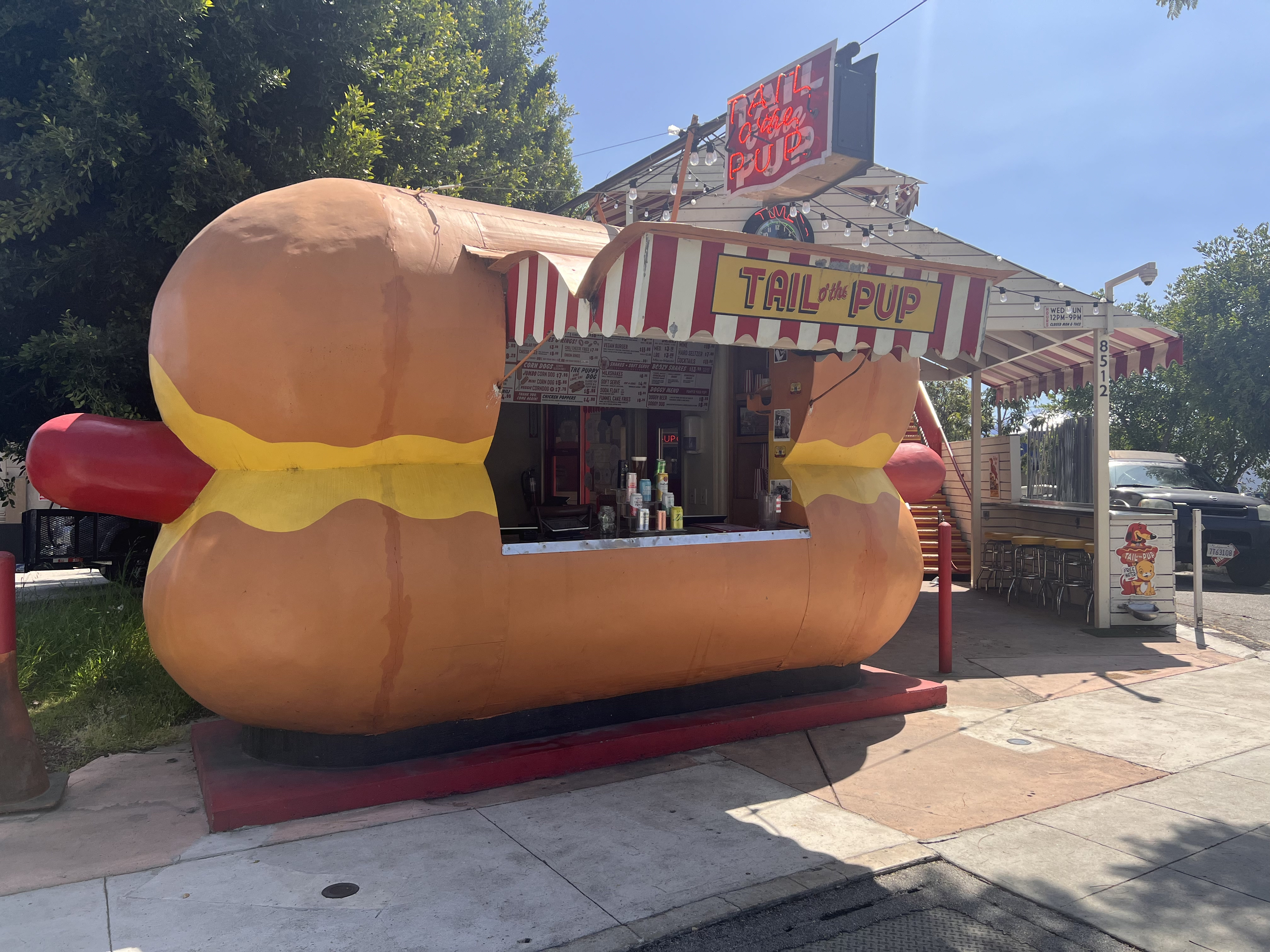
- Tail o' the Pup in 2024
- Interactive map of the Tail o' the Pup area

General information
- Type: Hot dog stand
- Architectural style: Novelty architecture
- Location: 8512 Santa Monica Boulevard, West Hollywood, California, United States
- Completed: 1946
- Renovated: 2018-2022
- Owner: 1933 Group

Design and construction
- Architect: Milton J. Black

Tail o’ the Pup is a Los Angeles, California hot dog stand shaped like a hot dog. Built in 1946, it is considered a prime example of programmatic architecture. It is one of the last surviving mid-20th century buildings built in the shape of the product it sold.

== History ==
Designed by Milton J. Black, the stand opened at 311 La Cienega Boulevard in 1946. Eddie Blake purchased the business from Veloz and Yolanda in 1976. Eddie ran it with the help of his son, Dennis.

Tail o' the Pup, 1981

The stand faced demolition in the mid-1980s, resulting in public outcry. The stand was instead moved 0.3 miles (0.48 km) to 329 North San Vicente Boulevard.

Regent Properties purchased the Pup's site from Cedars-Sinai Medical Center in the early 2000s and announced plans to build 152 condominium and apartment units at the location. The stand closed in 2005, after which the structure was moved into a Torrance warehouse. The City of Los Angeles declared the building a cultural landmark in 2006.

Blake's grandson Jay Miller and his wife Nicole inherited the Pup in 2017. After a failed attempt to partner with Killer Shrimp, the structure was donated to the Valley Relics Museum. 1933 Group purchased the structure in 2018 with plans to restore and reopen the stand. The stand reopened in 2022 at 8512 Santa Monica Blvd in West Hollywood.

== Architecture and design ==
Tail o' the Pup is 17 feet (5.2 m) long, reinforced with steel, and designed to resemble a hot dog with mustard. The design is considered programmatic.

== Film location ==
Tail o' the Pup was featured in several television shows and movies including: Columbo, Body Double, The Rockford Files, L.A. Story, and the music video for George Benson's 'Give Me The Night'..

== See also ==
- Coney Island Hot Dog Stand
- List of hot dog restaurants
- Randy's Donuts
