= Frank L. Meline =

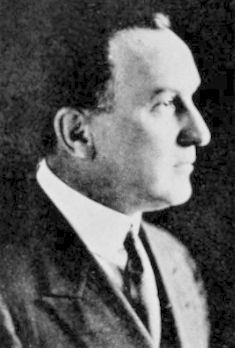
- Born: August 5, 1875; Jacksonville, Illinois, U.S.
- Died: August 17, 1944 (aged 69); Brentwood, Los Angeles, California, U.S.
- Occupations: Real estate developer, architect
- Spouse: Alma Meline

Frank L. Meline (August 5, 1875 – August 17, 1944) was an American real estate developer and architect who worked extensively in subdivisions and constructed more than 1,000 houses in southern California. He also designed numerous other buildings, several of which are listed either in the National Register of Historic Places or as Los Angeles Historic-Cultural Monuments.

== History ==
Frank L. Meline was born in Jacksonville, Illinois on August 5, 1875. He moved to Los Angeles in 1902.

Meline began his career as a window trimmer and later he was the first sales agent in Bel Air for developer Alphonzo Bell. In 1912, he formed his own construction company and in 1919 he expanded the company into full-service real-estate development and sales. By 1924, he had 18 branch offices and more than 300 employees throughout the Los Angeles area. Meline also founded the Meline Bond and Mortgage Company, allowing him to issue mortgages for the properties he built, and as a broker, he sold half the houses purchased in Beverly Hills before 1930.

Meline also operated laundry companies in Hollywood and Beverly Hills. His Hollywood laundry company, founded in 1915, was one of the first to provide regular service to individual residences.

Meline was appointed Board of Harbor Commissioners by Los Angeles mayor George E. Cryer in 1924, and he was also a member of the Los Angeles Athletic Club, Los Angeles Yacht Club, Hollywood Athletic Club, Bel Air Club, and Whitley Park Country Club.

In November 1941, due to ailing health, Meline sold his real estate business to his general manager and retired. Meline died in Brentwood, Los Angeles, California on August 17, 1944.

== List of works ==
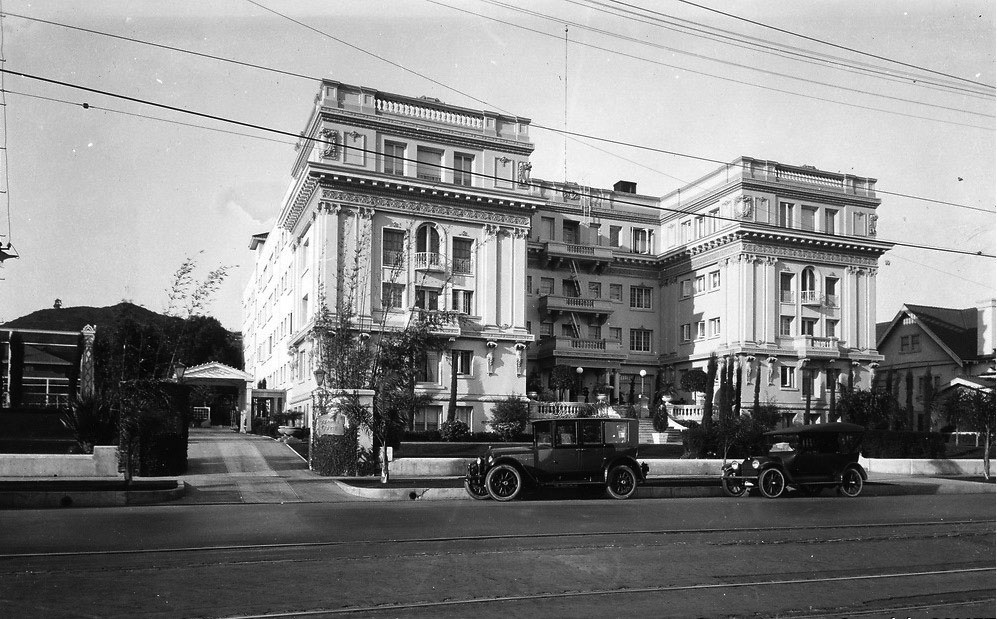
Garden Court Apartments in the 1920s

=== In Los Angeles ===
- Commercial building at 1501 N. Cahuenga Blvd (1914)
- Fifth Church of Christ, Scientist (1914-1915), LAHCM No. 1097
- Garden Court Apartments (1916), LAHCM No. 243, demolished April 1984
- Iris Theatre (1918)

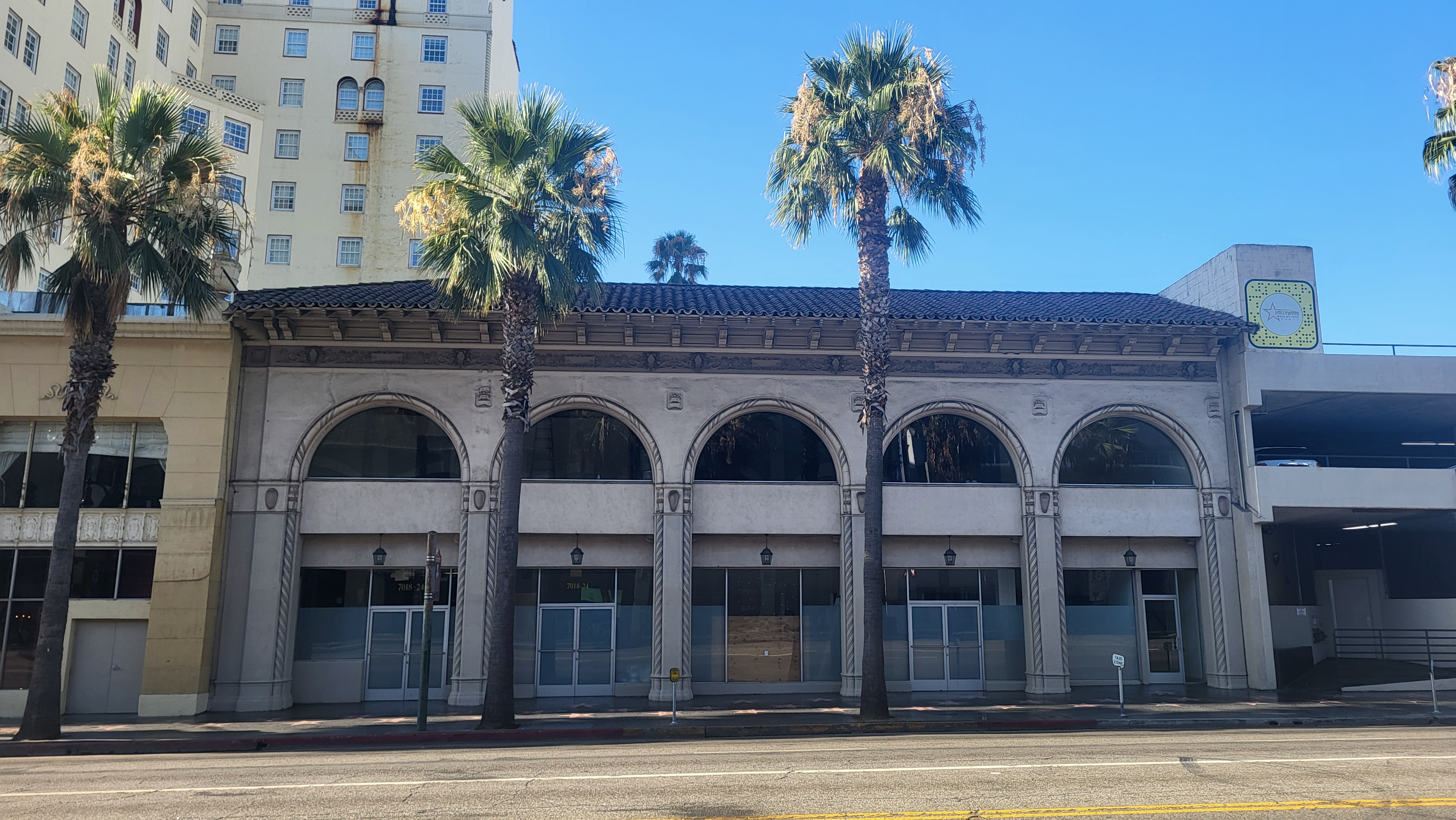
7024 W Hollywood Boulevard, now Johnny Grant Building, in 2024

- 7024 W Hollywood Boulevard (1919), NRHP-listed
- Woodley Theatre (1920 remodel, demolished 1925)
- H.H. Yanow Building (1920)
- Victor Schertzinger home (1921)
- Streetcar Commercial Building (1921)
- Ruskin Art Club (1922), LAHCM No. 639
- Lake Vista Apartments

Meline also developed subdivisions in Bel Air, Brentwood, Pacific Palisades, north San Fernando Valley, and Los Angeles's foothill areas.

=== Elsewhere ===
- 331 Palisades Ave, Santa Monica (1913), SML No. 65
- C. Reed Waterman Mausoleum, Inglewood

Meline also developed subdivisions in Beverly Hills and Ventura.

== See also ==
- List of American architects
- List of people from Los Angeles
