= Valley Relics Museum =

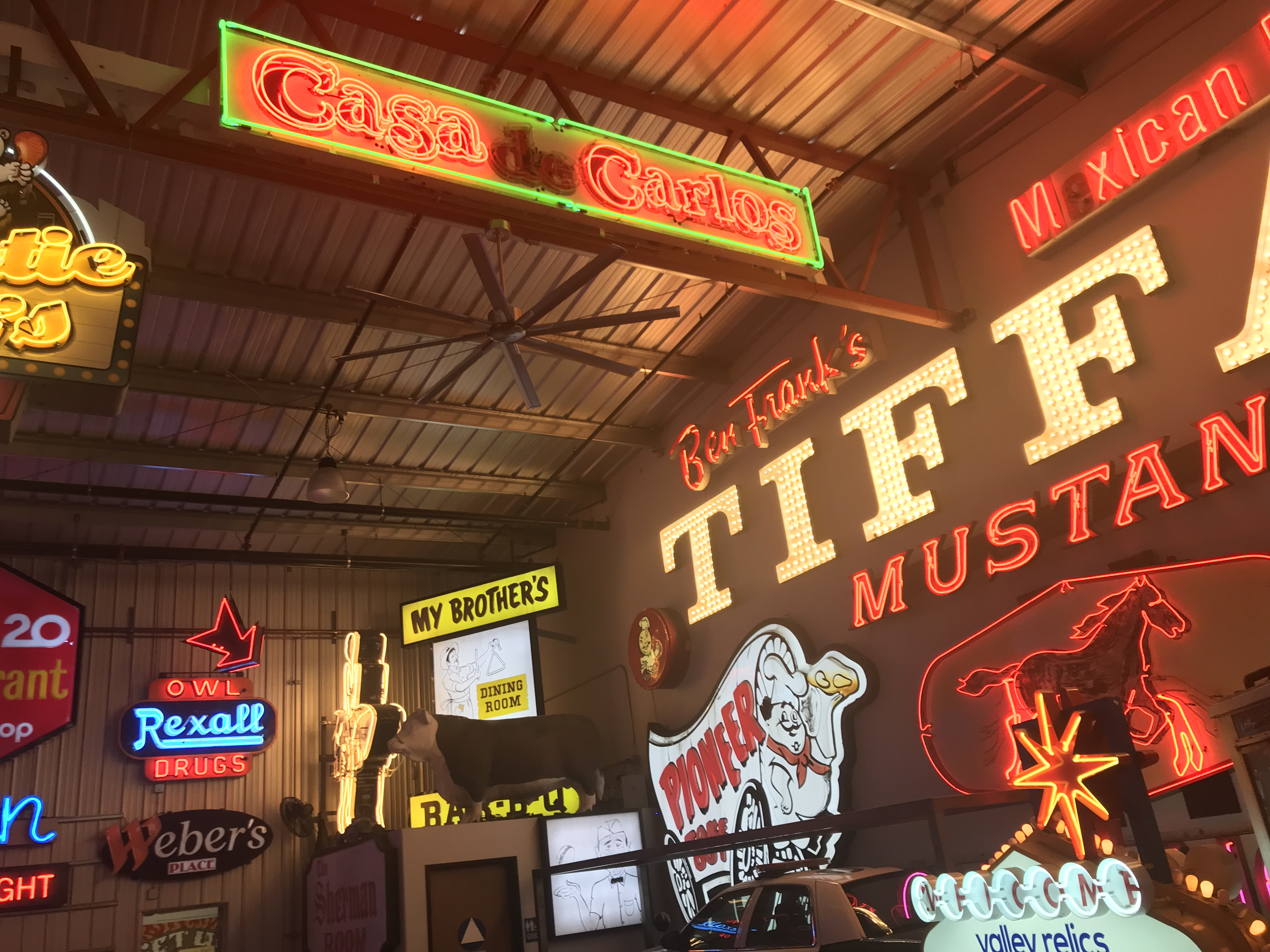
- An assortment of neon signs from defunct Valley businesses decorate the museum's interior.
- Established: 2013
- Location: 7900 Balboa Blvd. Van Nuys, CA 91406
- Coordinates: 34°12′44″N 118°30′3″W
- Type: History museum
- Director: Tommy Gelinas
- Website: valleyrelicsmuseum.org

Valley Relics Museum is a museum located in the San Fernando Valley of Los Angeles. The LA Weekly named the Valley Relics Museum one of its 2017 winners of "Best Of L.A.: Arts & Entertainment".

Founded in 2013 by Tommy Gelinas, Valley Relics Museum's collection spans from the 1800s to the present day, with over 20,000 items. Notable items include the original signage of popular North Hollywood country music venue the Palomino Club, and other San Fernando Valley landmarks. It also houses original costumes designed and made by North Hollywood-based rodeo tailor Nudie Cohn, costume designer for country music stars as well as Elvis Presley; two of the "Nudiemobiles", cars that were customized by Cohn, that remain in Cohn's family are housed at the museum (Cohen's 1975 Cadillac Eldorado convertible and 1964 Pontiac Safari wagon).

The museum also houses items from outside the valley, including the West Hollywood Tiffany Theater sign. The museum was also instrumental in preserving and housing the Tail o' the Pup hot dog stand, previously located in Beverly Hills and West Hollywood.

In addition, the collection includes over 150 BMX bikes from the 1970s to the 1980s (many were manufactured in the San Fernando Valley). The museum's total collection also includes vintage neon signs, postcards and fast food memorabilia, as well as a letter written by Isaac Newton Van Nuys, a 19th-century businessman and namesake of its Van Nuys neighborhood.

In 2018, the museum relocated from Chatsworth to a location near the Van Nuys Airport. According to the Los Angeles Daily News, despite increase in size of the Van Nuys location (over 10,000 square feet), the museum will only display about 45 percent of its collection at a time. It was only able to present 30 percent of its collection at a time at its Chatsworth location.

== Gallery ==
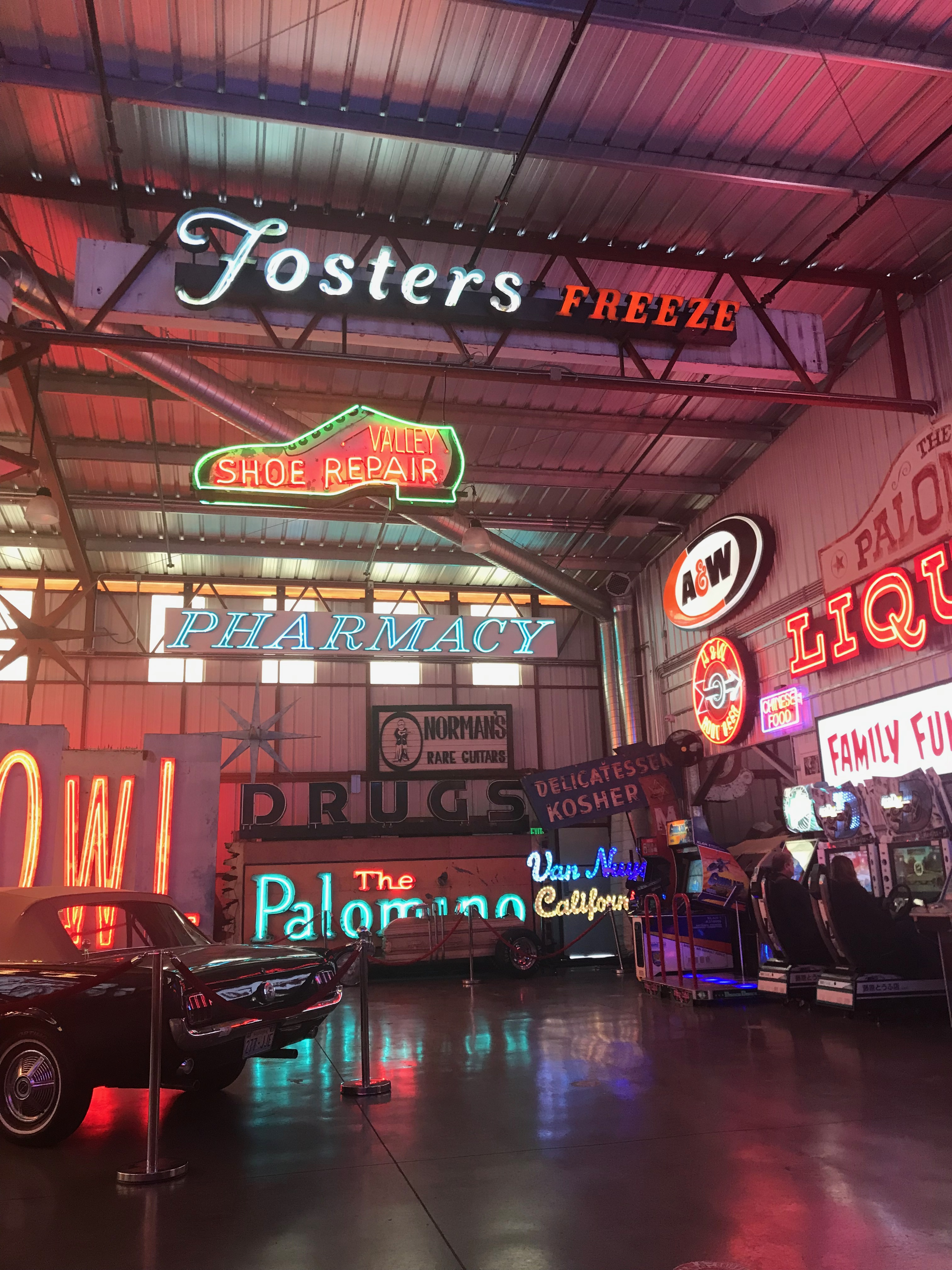
Neon signs are a major part of the museum's collection

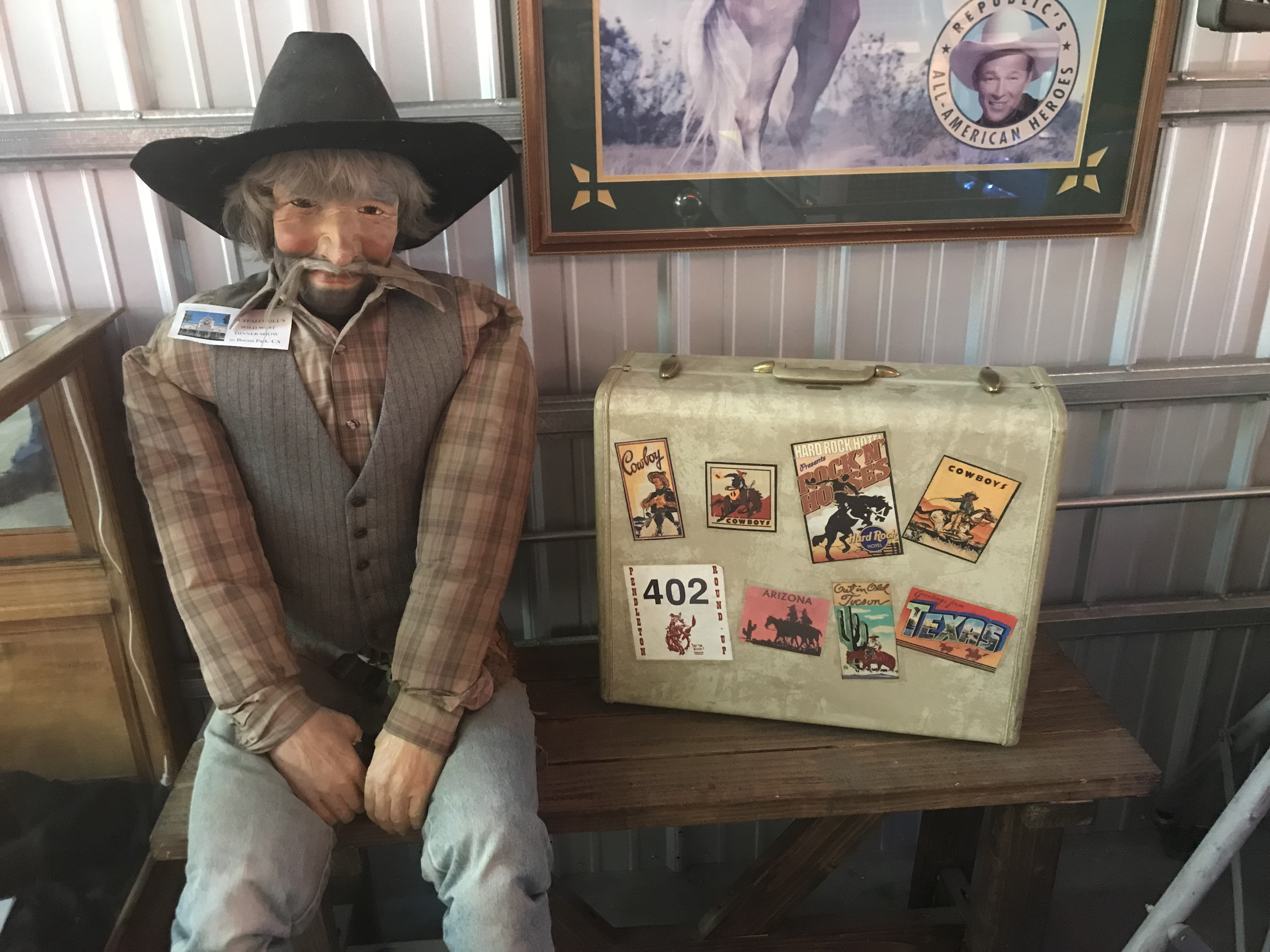
A mannequin from Buffalo Bill's Wild West show in Buena Park

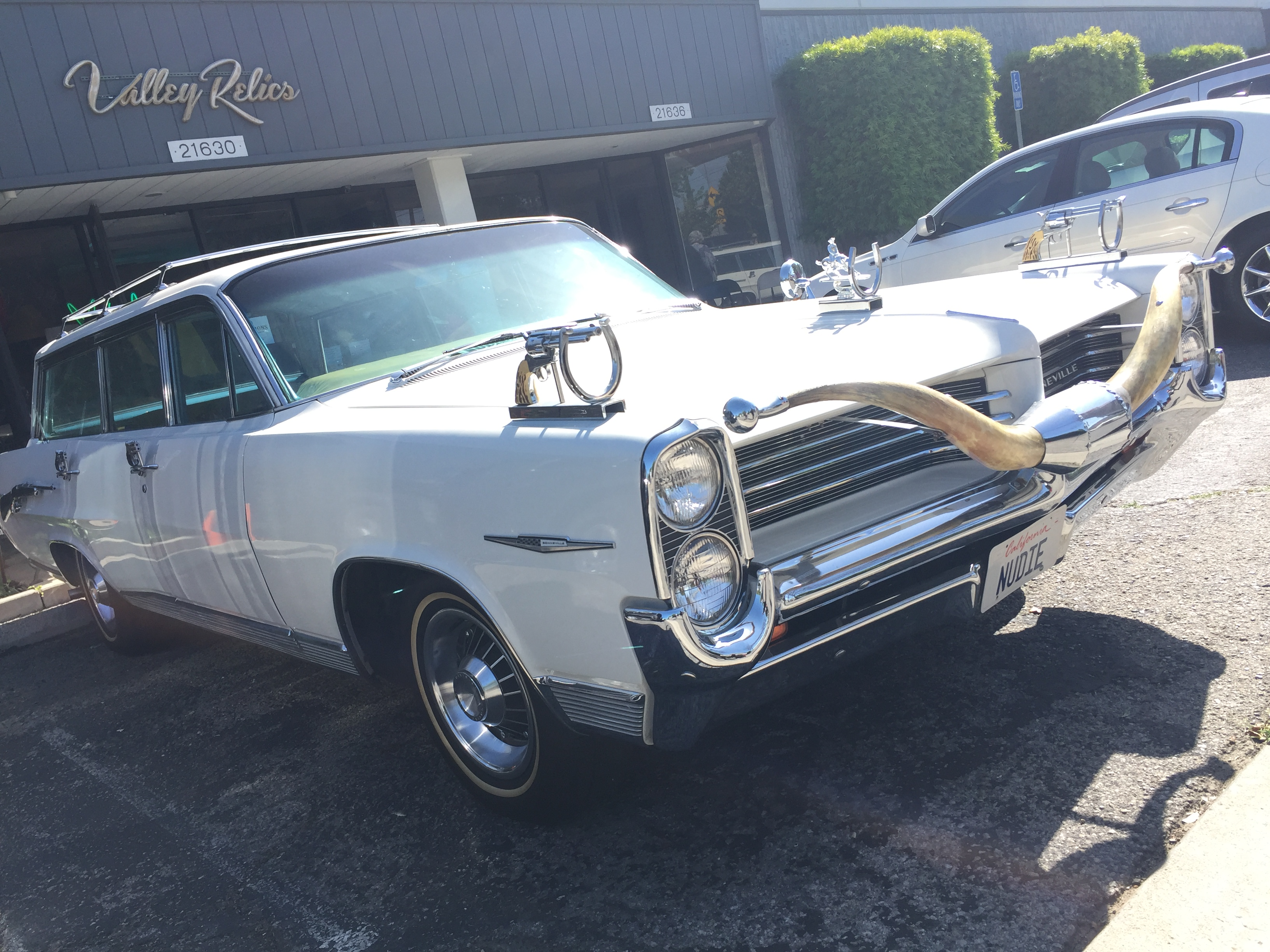
The original Chatsworth location museum and one of Nudie Cohn's cars
