= Agfa Ansco Corporation Building =

Historic commercial building in Los Angeles, California

- Location within the Los Angeles metropolitan area

General information
- Type: Commercial
- Architectural style: Art Deco/Streamline Moderne blend
- Location: 6424 West Santa Monica Boulevard, Hollywood, California
- Coordinates: 34.0907°N 118.3297°W
- Named for: Agfa Ansco Corporation
- Year built: 1937

Design and construction
- Architect: T. H. Pettit

Los Angeles Historic-Cultural Monument
- Designated: May 12, 2019
- Reference no.: 1181

Agfa Ansco Corporation Building is a historic commercial building located at 6424 West Santa Monica Boulevard in Hollywood, California. It was designated a Los Angeles Historic-Cultural Monument in 2019.

== History ==
Agfa Ansco Corporation Building was designed by T. H. Pettit for Agfa Ansco Corporation and built in 1937. The building housed the company until the 1959, after which Birns & Sawyer Cine Equipment Company occupied the building.

The building was designated Los Angeles Historic-Cultural Monument No. 1181 on May 12, 2019. It was owned by Jeremy Scott at the time.

== Architecture and design ==
Agfa Ansco Corporation Building consists of a one-story commercial structure and a two-and-a-half story tower, all of which blend Art Deco and Streamline Moderne styles in a design that was meant to make an architectural statement and attract attention. The building is rectangular in plan, built of brick and reinforced concrete with smooth stucco cladding, and topped by a flat roof with a raised parapet wall.

The building's primary entrance is centered in the building's tower, which is located on its northwest corner and also features a stepped decorative feature accented by incised geometric patterns. The entrance itself consists of a fully glazed metal door with a single-lite transom and stucco surround. Two dentilled bands and rounded metal signage are located above the door, with two pairs of multi-lite steel sash casement windows with fixed multi-lite transoms and circular medallions located above the signage. Bas relief spandrel panels with an Egyptian-inspired floral motif separate the tower's first and second levels, with multi-light steel sash windows in two of the three bays on the second level. The tower also features zigzag detailing, geometric ornament, and bas relief medallions that depict scrolls, scales, and sheaves of wheat.
