= Nirvana Apartments =

Historic apartment complex in Hollywood, California. U.S.

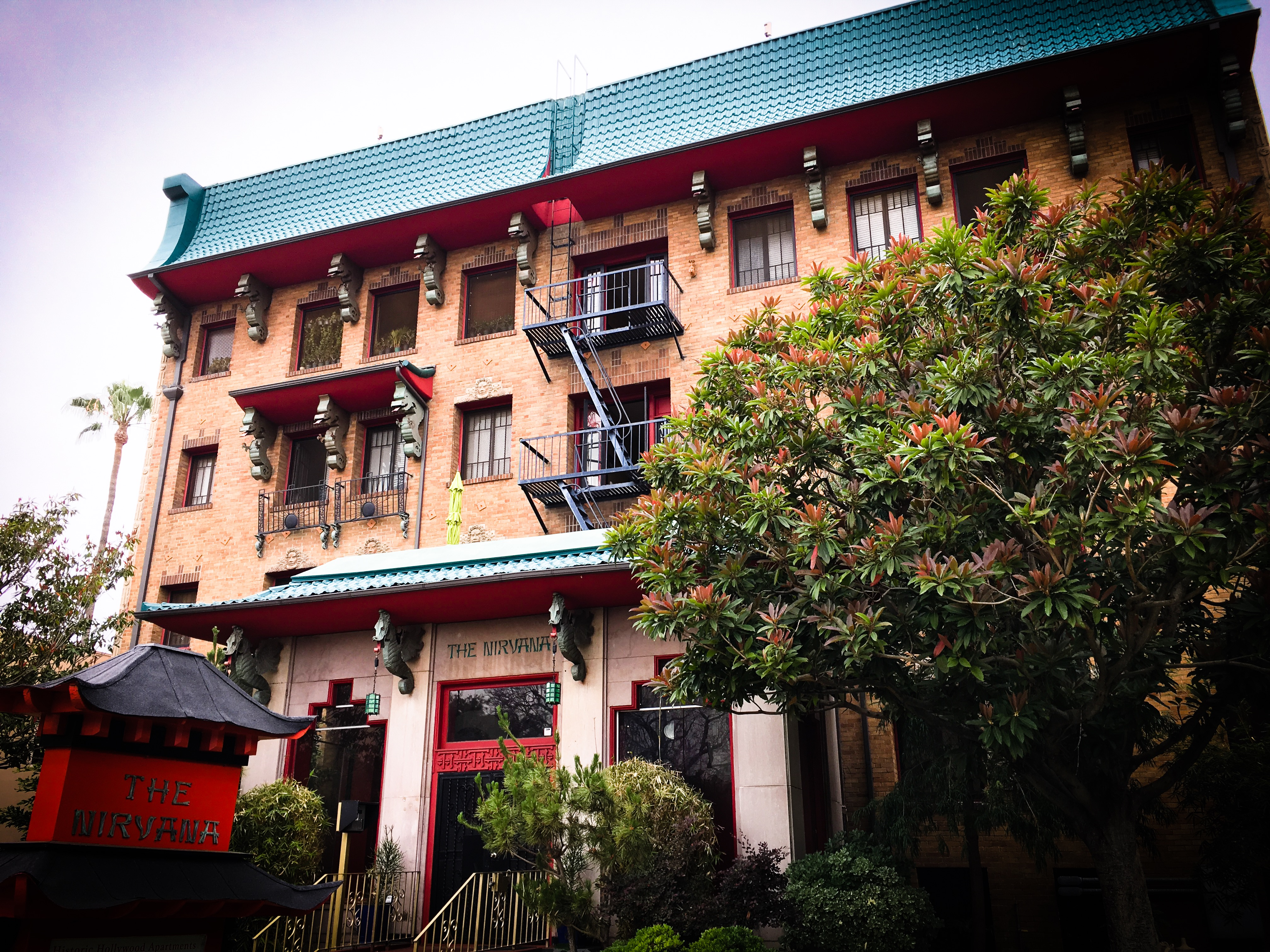
- The building in 2017

General information
- Type: Apartment hotel
- Architectural style: Oriental vernacular
- Location: 1775-1781 North Orange Dr. Hollywood, Los Angeles, California, U.S.
- Coordinates: 34°06′14″N 118°20′32″W
- Completed: 1925

Design and construction
- Architect: E.M. Erdaly

Los Angeles Historic-Cultural Monument
- Designated: July 13, 2005
- Reference no.: 816

Nirvana Apartments is a historic apartment hotel located at 1775-1781 North Orange Drive in Hollywood, California. It was declared Los Angeles Historic-Cultural Monument No. 816 in 2005.

== History ==
Nirvana Apartments was designed by E. M. Erdaly for Mr. and Mrs. S. G. Kraus and built in 1925. It was originally built as an apartment hotel and furnished with items from China and Japan. Considered "luxurious to the extreme," at one point the building contained the most expensive apartments in Hollywood. Former residents of the building include Lili Damita and Anna May Wong.

Nirvana Apartments was sold by Indemnity Mortgage Security Company to Hollywood Business Properties Limited for $250,000 in 1930 ($4.82 million in 2025), and from Mr. and Mrs. Frank C. Wheeler to an undisclosed buyer for $200,000 in 1945 ($3.58 million in 2025). The building was reported to contain about $40,000 ($715,342 in 2025) worth of Oriental furnishings when it was sold in 1945.

The building was declared Los Angeles Historic-Cultural Monument No. 816 on July 13, 2005.

== Architecture and design ==
Nirvana Apartments is four stories and features an Oriental vernacular design that includes brick cladding, rectangular massing, a symmetrical facade, a flat roof, a parapet, sheet metal and cast stone detailing, and divided light wood casement and double-hung windows. The city of Los Angeles has described the design as "fantastical".
