= Christine Wetherill Stevenson =

American dramatist

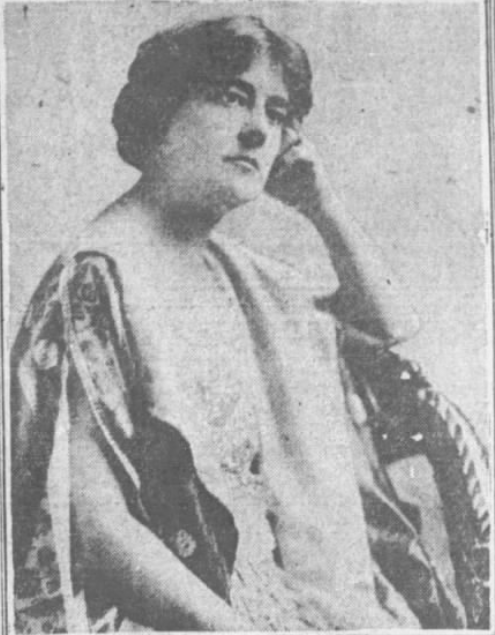
- Born: Christine Wetherill; April 12, 1878; Philadelphia, Pennsylvania, U.S.
- Died: November 21, 1922 (aged 43–44); Media, Pennsylvania, U.S.
- Resting place: Laurel Hill Cemetery, Philadelphia, Pennsylvania, U.S.
- Occupations: Philanthropist, dramatist, actress
- Known for: Founded the Philadelphia Art Alliance and The Pilgrimage Theater (now the John Anson Ford Amphitheatre)
- Spouses: John V. Rice, Jr.; William Yorke Stevenson

Christine Wetherill Stevenson (April 12, 1878 – November 21, 1922) was an heiress of the Pittsburgh Paint Company and founder of the Philadelphia Art Alliance.

She helped fund the Daisy Dell which became the Hollywood Bowl, in the Hollywood Hills neighborhood of Los Angeles, California. She established the Pilgrimage Theatre (now known as the John Anson Ford Amphitheatre) in Hollywood Hills. She played a major role in the theater's first production, Life of Christ, which received significant advance newspaper coverage and was described "an American Oberammergau".

== Early life ==
Born on April 12, 1878, in Philadelphia, Pennsylvania, as Christine Wetherill, she was a daughter of Samuel Price Wetherill (1846-1926) and Christine (Northrop) Wetherill (1852-1930). Her father was a descendant of Samuel Wetherill, who was a fellow member, with Betsy Ross, of the Free Quaker Meeting House.

Christine Wetherill was married twice, first to John V. Rice, Jr., whom she divorced in 1902, and then to William Yorke Stevenson, son of Cornelius and Sara Yorke Stevenson, in 1908.

== Career ==
During the late 1910s and early 1920s, Stevenson formed an art alliance with Marie Rankin Clarke, and raised money with her to buy a piece of land on Cahuenga Pass called "Daisy Dell". They then rehearsed together for their first play there, Light of Asia. A second series of plays was planned, The Pilgrimage, when resistance was met from Clarke and others in the group who wanted to expand the venue's themes. Leaving them to form the Hollywood Bowl, she bought twenty-nine acres (12 ha) of land on the other side of Cahuenga Pass to build a new amphitheater for her plays, naming it The Pilgrimage Theatre, and created the Pilgrimage Play.

Today The Pilgrimage Theatre is known as the John Anson Ford Amphitheatre in Los Angeles.

Stevenson was also known as the founder of the Philadelphia Art Alliance, which is housed in the former Samuel Price Wetherill Mansion.

== Death and legacy ==
She died in Media, Pennsylvania, on November 21, 1922, and was interred at Philadelphia's Laurel Hill Cemetery.

A memorial service was held in her honor on Sunday, November 26, 1922, at 3:00 p.m. in the Pilgrimage Theater. In pre-memorial announcements about the planned event, newspapers reported: "Hollywood is asked to attend the service, and pay tribute in all reverence to the woman who brought the Pilgrimage Play to Hollywood."

The Hollywood Cross, a thirty-two-foot-high steel cross, at 2580 Cahuenga Boulevard was erected in 1923 to her memory.

== Timeline – Hollywood Bowl and Pilgrimage Theatre ==
- 1916 – Hollywood's first outdoor theatre production takes place in nearby Beachwood Canyon.
- 1918 – First organizational meeting leads to plans for a permanent park and art center in Hollywood; Christine Wetherill Stevenson produces the religious drama, Light of Asia, on the grounds of the Theosophical Society above Beachwood Canyon.
- 1919 – Theatre Arts Alliance incorporated, with Christine Wetherill Stevenson as president; purchase of 59 acres (24 ha) in Bolton Canyon for $47,500 on which to build a community park and art center.
- 1920 – Christine leaves the Theatre Art Alliance and purchases 29 acres (12 ha) of land on the other side of Cahuenga Pass to build a new amphitheater for her plays.
- 1920 – Community Park and Art Association established, replacing Theatre Arts Alliance
- 1922 – Christine Wetherill Stevenson dies
- 1929 – Fire destroys Pilgrimage Theatre and theatre rebuilt
