= El Cadiz Apartments =

Historic apartment complex in Hollywood, California. U.S.

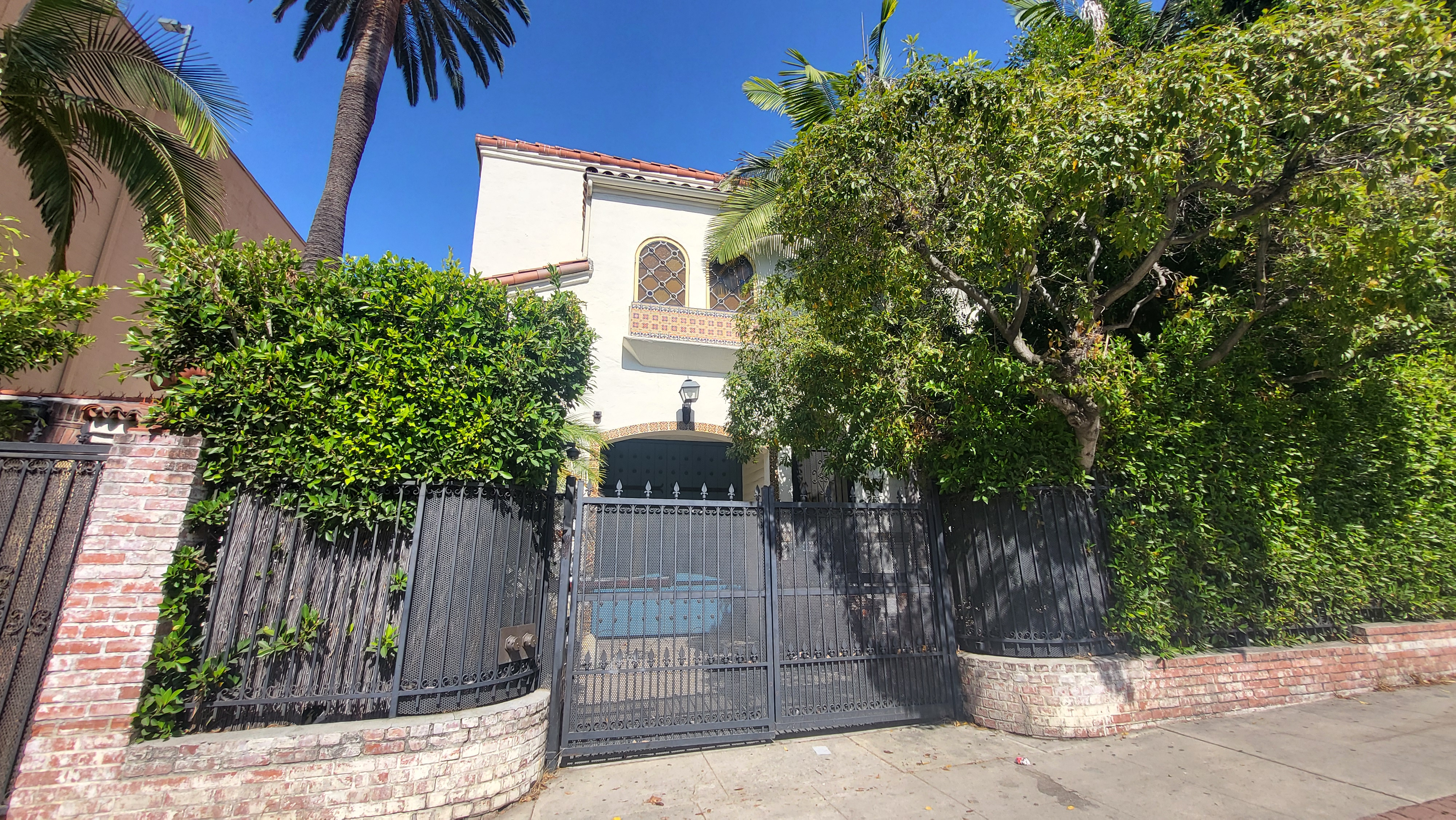
- The building in 2026
- Interactive map of the El Cadiz Apartments area

General information
- Type: Apartment building
- Architectural style: Spanish Colonial Revival/Andalusian
- Location: 1721 N. Sycamore Avenue, Hollywood, Los Angeles, California, U.S.
- Coordinates: 34°06′09″N 118°20′37″W
- Completed: 1937

Design and construction
- Architect: Milton J. Black

Los Angeles Historic-Cultural Monument
- Designated: April 27, 2004
- Reference no.: 775

El Cadiz Apartments is a historic apartment building located at 1721 North Sycamore Avenue in Hollywood, California. It was declared Los Angeles Historic-Cultural Monument No. 775 in 2005.

== History ==
El Cadiz Apartments was designed by Milton J. Black and built in 1937.

The building was restored by Ryland Hawkins in 2003 and bought by the Church of Scientology for $4.6 million ($8.05 million in 2025) that same year. It was declared Los Angeles Historic-Cultural Monument No. 775 six months after its purchase, on April 27, 2004.

== Architecture and design ==
El Cadiz Apartments features a courtyard and a Spanish Colonial Revival/Andalusian design. The building’s garage is in its basement.
