= Hollywood Premiere Motel =

Motel in Hollywood, Los Angeles, California

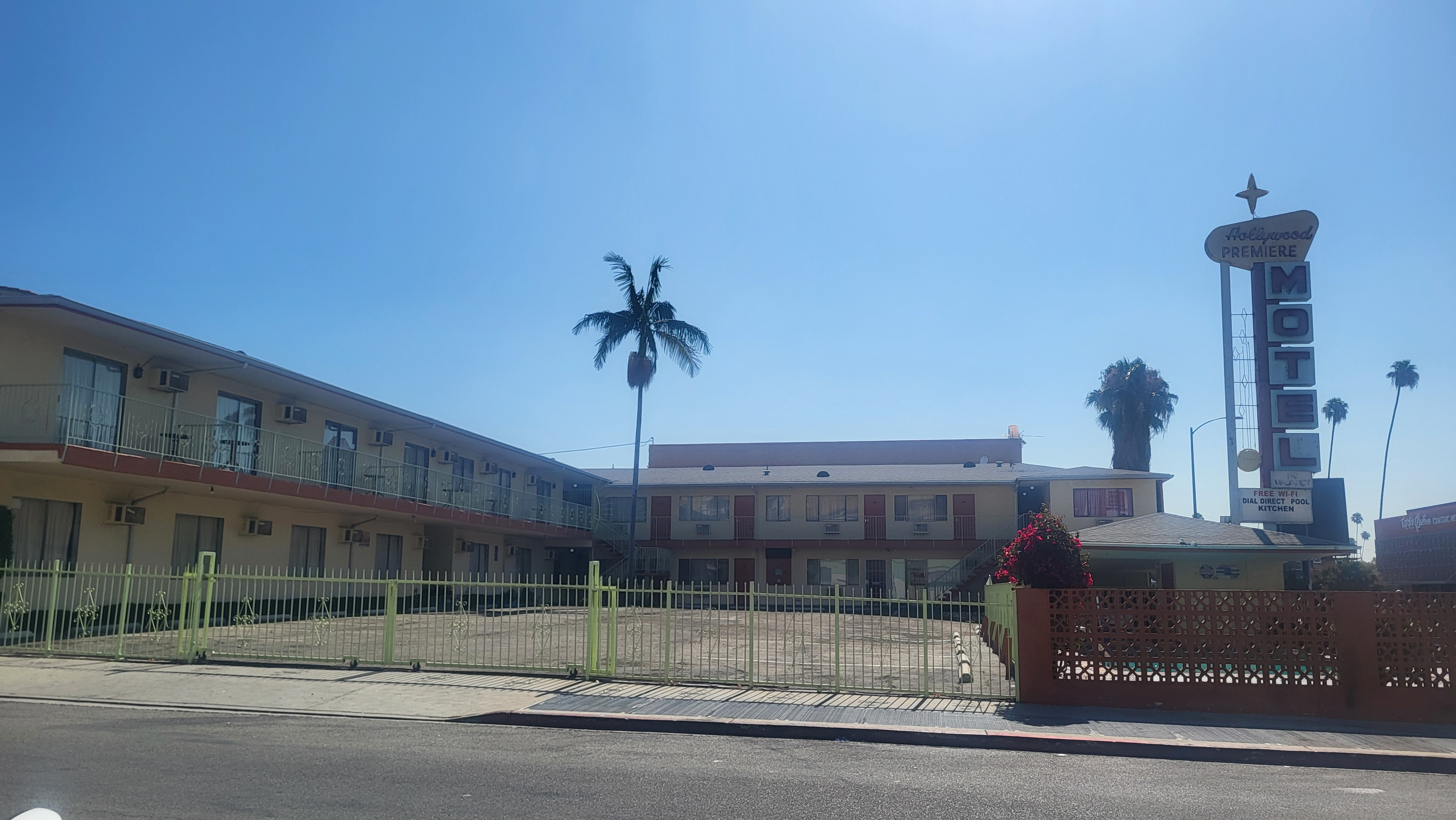
- The building (looking east) in 2026

- Location within the Los Angeles metropolitan area

General information
- Type: Motel
- Architectural style: Mid-century Modern
- Location: 5329-5337 W. Hollywood Boulevard and 1716-1718 N. Serrano Avenue, Hollywood, California
- Coordinates: 34.10204°N 118.30694°W
- Completed: 1960
- Owner: Bonnie Xi

Technical details
- Floor count: 2

Design and construction
- Architect: Joyce Miller

Other information
- Number of rooms: 42

Website
- hollywoodpremieremotella.us

Los Angeles Historic-Cultural Monument
- Designated: July 30, 2025
- Reference no.: 1325

Hollywood Premiere Motel is a historic two-story motel located at 5329-5337 W. Hollywood Boulevard and 1716-1718 N. Serrano Avenue in Hollywood, California. It was declared Los Angeles Historic-Cultural Monument No. 1325 in 2025.

== History ==
Hollywood Premiere Motel was designed by Joyce Miller and built in 1960. Bonnie Xi became its owner in the 1980s. (Note: Bonnie Xi had owned the building for four decades in 2025)

The motel was declared Los Angeles Historic-Cultural Monument No. 1325 on July 30, 2025. Los Angeles City Council voted 13-2 in favor of the designation, which was nominated by James Dastoli. The motel was the first of its kind to achieve this designation and with this designation, Joyce Miller became the third female architect to have a building listed as a Los Angeles Historic-Cultural Monument.

== Architecture and design ==
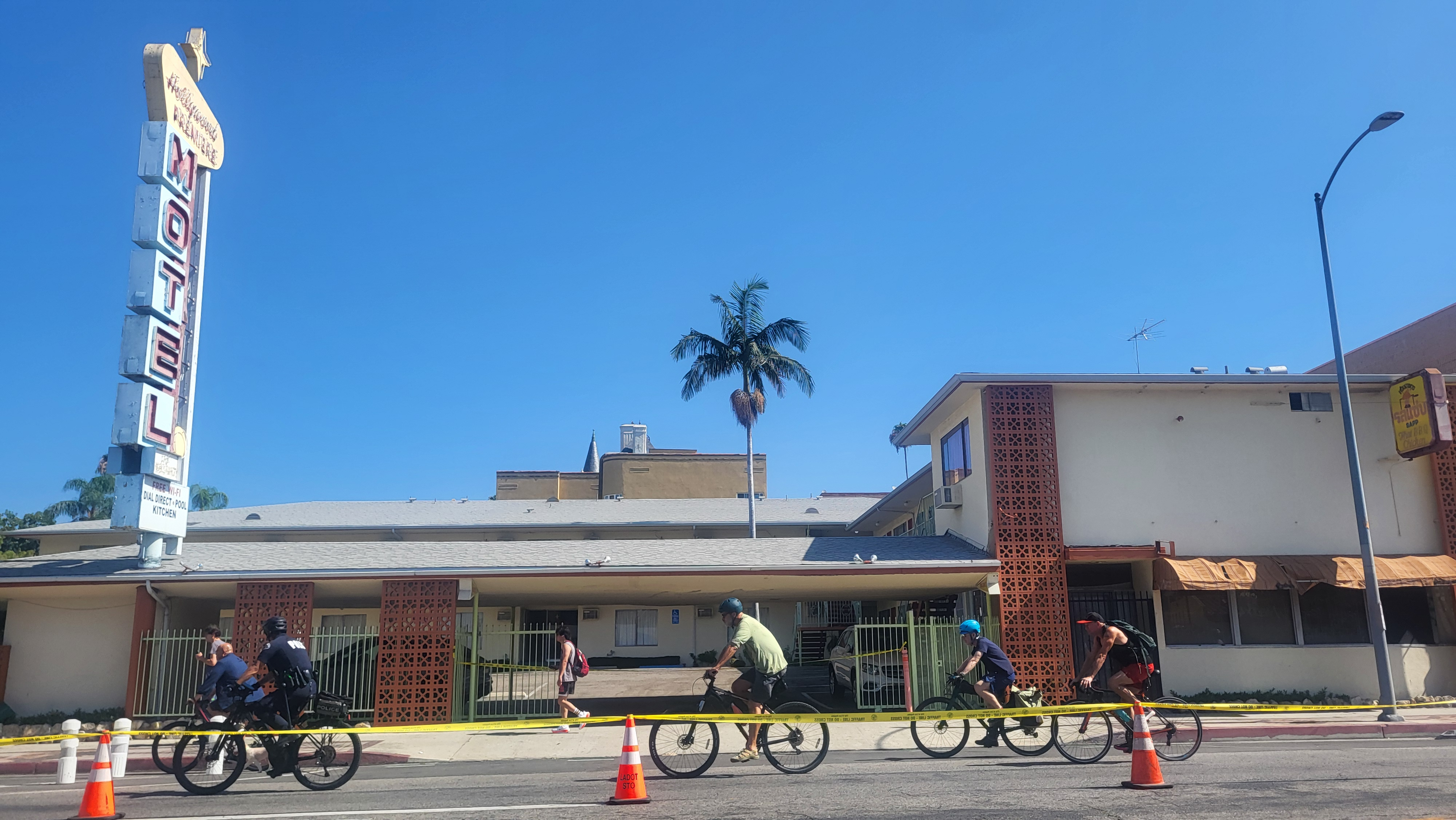
Hollywood Boulevard front during CicLAvia

Hollywood Premiere Motel is a two-story, 42-unit wood-frame construction with stucco cladding. It features a Mid-century Modern design that includes simple geometric volumes, relatively chaste exterior walls, decorative concrete blocks, and a low slope hipped roof clad in composition shingles with overhanging eaves. Alterations to the building are minimal and consist mostly of the addition and remodel of signs.

The building is roughly U-shaped and consists of four connecting volumes. The primary facade is south-facing and fronts Hollywood Boulevard. Most of this elevation consists of an extended porte cochere with perforated block screens that cover the motel's driveway and several parking spots, while the eastern portion features perforated block screens, a large wall sign, four fixed windows covered by a cloth awning, and a storefront whose entrance is recessed, covered by a woodshed roof, and consists of a steel-framed assembly around a glazed door flanked by sidelights and a transom window. Additionally, the eastern-most portion of the south-facing elevation cantilevers over a second driveway.

The building has a secondary south-facing facade, located behind the parking lot that itself is located behind the primary facade. This elevation features a centered first-floor breezeway and a second-story balcony and metal railing that spans the entire width of the facade. This elevation also features first-floor sliding windows and second-floor sliding glass doors.

The building's west-facing facade is mostly fronted by a parking lot, the parking lot fronted by a decorative metal fence, rolling gate, and perforated block wall that connects to the primary south-facing facade. The west-facing facade features two sets of floating staircases (one V-shaped, the other not) with metal railings that lead to a second-story balcony also with metal railings. Entries to individual units are located on the first and second floors of this elevation and consist of a metal slab door beside tripartite metal windows consisting of a fixed center window and two sliding windows. The southern end of this elevation protrudes westward and connects to the south-facing porte cochere, while the northern end is also the western side of the building's northern volume and features two floating staircases with decorative metal railings that connect to a landing, the landing connected to a centered, recessed stairway that lead to a recessed entryway.

The building's north-facing rear facade mirrors the secondary south-facing facade excepting eastern-most portion of the second story, where the eastern volume protrudes to the width of the north facade's balcony. The building's eastern facade elevation is utilitarian in design. Fenestration consists of flush-mounted aluminum sliding windows on all facades.

The motel grounds also contain a pool screened by a perforated block wall, while the motel itself features a neon-colored Googie sign that reads "Hollywood Premiere Motel" and "No Vacancy" and has been described as "iconic". Guests who've stayed at the motel have described it as "eerie" and "sketchy", and the motel has also been described as "rundown" and "a survivor". In 2025, the motel ranked 112th out of 118 hotels in Los Angeles on Tripadvisor. The City of Los Angeles considers the building an "excellent example of a 1960s motel that accommodated automobile tourism in Hollywood;" however, the city also stateed the building "does not exhibit quality of design through distinctive features and is not an excellent example of the Mid-Century Modern architectural style."

== Filming location ==
Hollywood Premiere Motel and its sign were featured in Twin Peaks, season 3 of Fargo, NCIS: Los Angeles, and the music video for Justin Timberlake’s "Can’t Stop the Feeling".
