= John Anson Ford Amphitheatre =

Music venue in Los Angeles, California

- The Ford
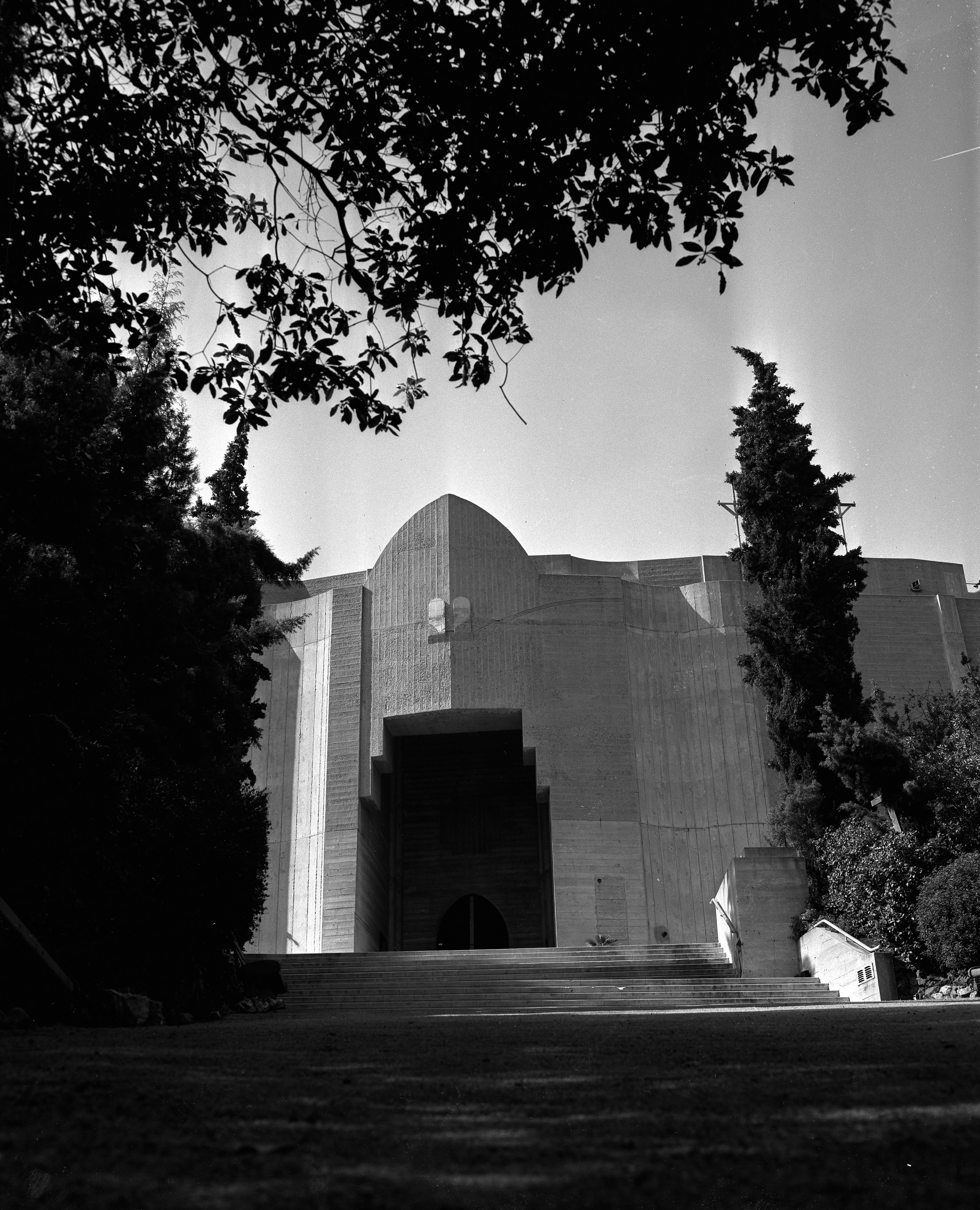
- The Ford as photographed by the Los Angeles Times in 1956
- Interactive map of John Anson Ford Amphitheatre
- Former names: The Pilgrimage Theatre
- Address: 2580 Cahuenga Blvd E
- Location: Los Angeles, California
- Coordinates: 34°6′49.76″N 118°20′7.9″W
- Owner: County of Los Angeles
- Capacity: Amphitheatre: 1,200
- Type: Amphitheatre
- Public transit: Los Angeles Metro Rail; B Line at Hollywood/Vine; Los Angeles Metro Bus; Line 222 (northbound only)

Construction
- Built: 1920
- Renovated: 1931; July 8, 2016

Website
- fordtheatres.org

The John Anson Ford Amphitheatre, officially nicknamed The Ford, is a music venue in the Hollywood Hills of Los Angeles, California. The 1,200-seat outdoor amphitheatre is situated within the Cahuenga Pass within the Santa Monica Mountains, directly across the U.S. 101 freeway from its official sister venue, the Hollywood Bowl. Located in a County regional park, the facility is owned by the County of Los Angeles and operated in partnership with the Ford Theatre Foundation and the Los Angeles County Department of Parks and Recreation. Built in 1920 and named after LA County Supervisor John Anson Ford in 1976, the Ford has been operated by the Los Angeles Philharmonic since 2020.

== History ==
=== Christine Wetherill Stevenson and The Pilgrimage Play ===
An amphitheatre was built in 1920 as a venue for The Pilgrimage Play. The author, Christine Wetherill Stevenson, believed the rugged beauty of the Cahuenga Pass would provide a dramatic outdoor setting for the play. And for this reason, Stevenson named it the Pilgrimage Theatre. Together with Mrs. Chauncey D. Clark, she purchased the land along with that on which the Hollywood Bowl now sits. A wooden, outdoor amphitheatre was built on the site and the play was performed by noted actors every summer from 1920 to 1929, until the original structure was destroyed by a brush fire in October 1929.

=== Rebuild and Renaming ===
A new theatre was constructed of poured concrete and designed in the style of ancient Judaic architecture to resemble the gates of Jerusalem on the same site and opened in 1931. The Pilgrimage Play was again performed there, interrupted only by World War II. In 1941 the land was deeded to the County of Los Angeles. The Pilgrimage Play continued to be presented until a lawsuit in 1964 forced its closure because of its religious nature. Still, the bridge connecting the Ford to Cahuenga Boulevard over U.S. 101 was named the Pilgrimage Bridge, in honor of the play.

In 1976, the Pilgrimage Theatre was renamed the John Anson Ford Theatre in honor of the late LA County Supervisor's significant support of the arts. John Anson Ford (1883–1983) helped found the LA County Arts Commission, encouraged the Board of Supervisors to support the building of The Music Center and led the County's acquisition of Descanso Gardens, among many other achievements. The 1,200 seat amphitheatre and an 87-seat indoor black box theatre built underneath the amphitheatre in 1971 were used intermittently for Shakespearean theatre, jazz concerts and dance performances until former County Supervisor Ed Edelman revived the historic theatre, spurring the creation of the Ford Amphitheatre Summer Season (originally called "Summer Nights at the Ford") in 1993 and obtaining funding for capital improvements to the facility.

=== Ford Theatres Project ===
Starting in 2014, the Ford Theatres began the process of undergoing a series of renovations that would rehabilitate and improve the current historic theatre and add new facilities and amenities within the current boundaries of the Ford Theatres property. After two years of renovations, the Ford reopened in 2016 with completion of Phase One of the Ford Theatres Project.

== Summer Season and Partnership Program ==
The Ford summer season's partnership program was designed to enable Los Angeles County music, dance and theatre groups to produce successfully in a major venue. Unlike a typical presenting model, groups and producers are selected through a competitive application process and receive front of house, production and marketing support, while keeping the bulk of the box office proceeds. From that first summer series in 1993, the program has supported hundreds of local arts organizations and producers.

The Ford Theatres presents an eclectic season of music, dance, theatre, film and family events reflective of the communities that comprise Los Angeles County. In addition to its multidisciplinary partnership program, the Ford's summer season includes a 10-part series showcasing artists from around the world, a six-part series for families and interactive participatory arts events that take place at its amphitheatre in Hollywood and at public sites across the County.
