= Garden Court Apartments (Los Angeles) =

Former apartment building in California, United States

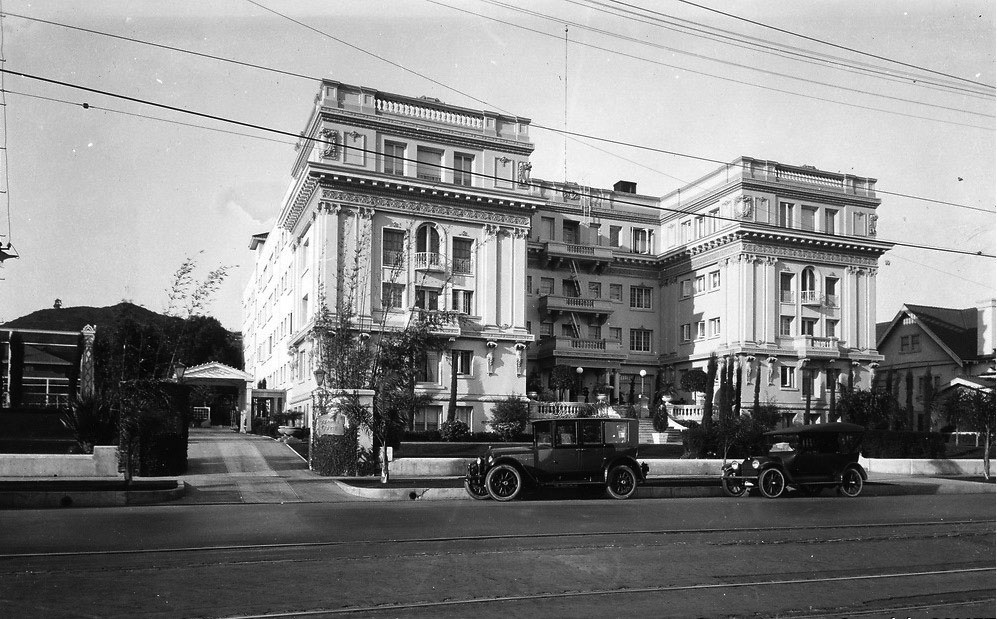
- The building in the 1920s
- Interactive map of the Garden Court Apartments area

General information
- Type: Apartment
- Location: 7021 Hollywood Blvd., Los Angeles, California
- Coordinates: 34.1018°N 118.3430°W
- Construction started: 1916 or 1917
- Demolished: 1984
- Governing body: Private

Design and construction
- Architect: Frank Meline

Los Angeles Historic-Cultural Monument
- Designated: April 28, 1981
- Reference no.: 243

Garden Court Apartments was a four-story, 190-room apartment complex on Hollywood Boulevard in the Hollywood neighborhood of Los Angeles, California. The complex was notable for its history, tenants, and luxurious nature.

== History ==
Garden Court Apartments was designed by Frank Meline and built in 1916 or 1917, at the behest of J.E. Ransford. The complex, which contained 190 rooms, was considered high luxury for its time, and featured tennis courts, ballrooms, a billiard room, and suites furnished with oriental carpets, oil paintings, and grand pianos. Some of the building's most notable residents include Clara Bow, John Gilbert, Carl Laemmle, Stan Laurel, Louis B. Mayer, Mae Murray, and Mack Sennett.

The building's fortunes declined in the 1960s, and in the late 1970s, it became the rallying point for Hollywood preservation. Numerous plans were announced and fundraisers held to transform the building into a film museum, but to no avail; the site was purchased with plans to build a new 13-story building on the property.

Although Garden Court Apartments was designated a Los Angeles Cultural-Historic Monument, one that emphasized the rarity of its architectural style, it succumbed to resident and fire damage. By 1980, the building was inhabited by squatters and nicknamed "Hotel Hell". In 1985, it was considered as a contributing property in the Hollywood Boulevard Commercial and Entertainment District, but it ultimately was not included due to its damage and partial demolition. It was fully demolished later that year.

The 13-story building planned for the site was never built. Instead, the Hollywood Galaxy was built and served as home of the Hollywood Entertainment Museum until it closed in 2007.

== Architecture and design ==
Garden Court Apartments was made of brick and concrete and designed in the Beaux Arts/Italian Renaissance style. It had an H-shaped layout with symmetrical massing. Its facade was white and featured with a portico entrance guarded by caryatids holding up pilasters above the first story, and figural corbels that supported second-story molding.

Each apartment interior was decorated with rich mahogany and ivory trim, and included hard wood floors and plate glass windows. The building also contained an ornately carved mahogany staircase.
