= Scientology properties =

- Type: Properties owned or operated by Church of Scientology
- Description: Facilities used for religious services, administration, training, outreach, preservation of materials
- Major locations: Clearwater, Florida; Los Angeles, California; international sites
- Functions: Churches, advanced organizations, administrative centers, and archival facilities
- Expansion: Acquisition of historic buildings, fundraising campaigns, renovation projects
- Associated controversies: Zoning disputes, community opposition, questions about financial transparency

The Church of Scientology (COS) owns hundreds of properties worldwide, with major concentrations in Los Angeles, California and Clearwater, Florida, a 500-acre compound in Southern California, a 55-acre campus in England, and a cruise ship in the Caribbean. In Clearwater, the church has purchased most of the surrounding real estate near its facilities, a practice critics describe as creating a buffer zone from the public. In Hollywood, COS has become the largest private owner of historic buildings through its acquisition program. In recent decades, the church has engaged in extensive fundraising campaigns and has continued to acquire properties across the United States and internationally. Because much of their property is designated "for religious purposes", the Church of Scientology has saved millions of dollars in property taxes.

== Clearwater, Florida ==
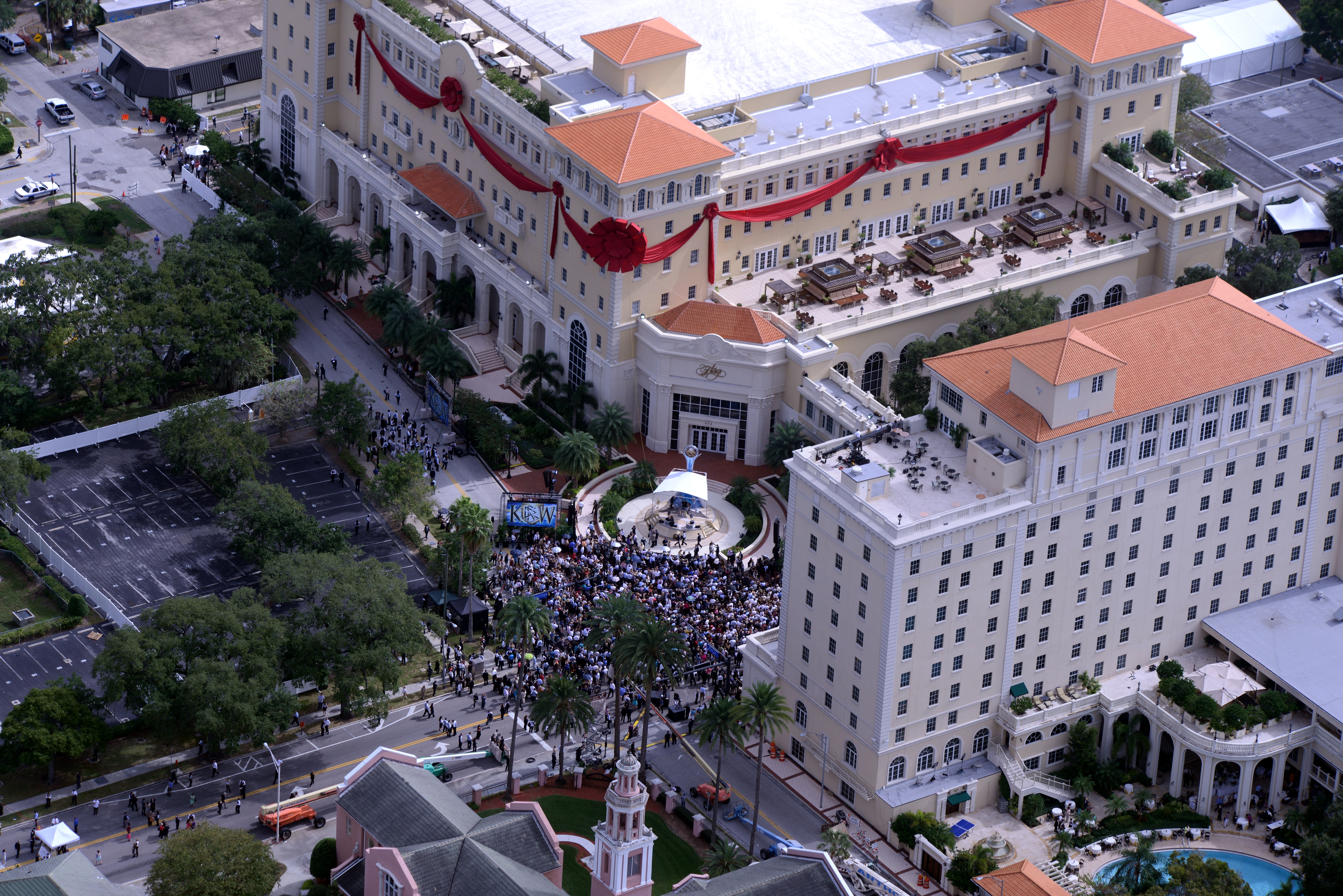
The Fort Harrison Hotel (foreground) and the Flag Building (background) in Clearwater

Starting with their first purchase of buildings in 1975 when L. Ron Hubbard's flotilla of ships came ashore, the Clearwater campus is called the Flag Land Base, and has come to be considered the "worldwide spiritual headquarters" and mecca of Scientology.

The Church of Scientology (COS) has been buying up properties in Clearwater. By 2019, 185 properties covering 101 acres of commercial real estate in downtown Clearwater were owned by COS or its members. According to an investigative report by the Tampa Bay Times, half were bought in the 20 months prior to the report, and numerous properties lay vacant. By 2024, that number had swelled to 200 properties purchased since 2017, leaving just 7 remaining non-Scientology owners of commercial properties in the downtown core, while "most of the vacancies in the downtown core are in buildings owned by companies tied to the church", according to the Times. Former Scientology official Tom De Vocht suggested COS was creating a buffer around its core properties to keep the public away.

About 75% of the Church's holdings in Clearwater are exempt from property taxes because of "religious purposes". The use of the Fort Harrison Hotel was a combination of hotel and religious services, since their purchase in 1975—until the Flag Building was opened in 2013 and the Fort Harrison was renovated and reopened as a hotel only. The Church saved approximately $1.2 million in property taxes on this property alone.

== Los Angeles, California ==
Daniel Miller of The Hollywood Reporter wrote that as of 2011 "the Church of Scientology owns, by most accounts, more historic buildings in Hollywood than any other entity and is one of the community's biggest property owners... In total, the church owns seven historic Hollywood properties worth about $400 million, part of a Hollywood real estate empire of 26 properties, according to real estate experts." Professor of religious studies Hugh Urban believes COS has purchased so many historic properties to "imbue itself with historical significance". Other issues brought up about the Church of Scientology's purchase of so many properties is that many of the buildings are exempt from paying property taxes, and there are claims that "the historic-building program is simply part of a public relations and marketing campaign designed to bolster the church's ranks of celebrity adherents and distract from the group's controversies".

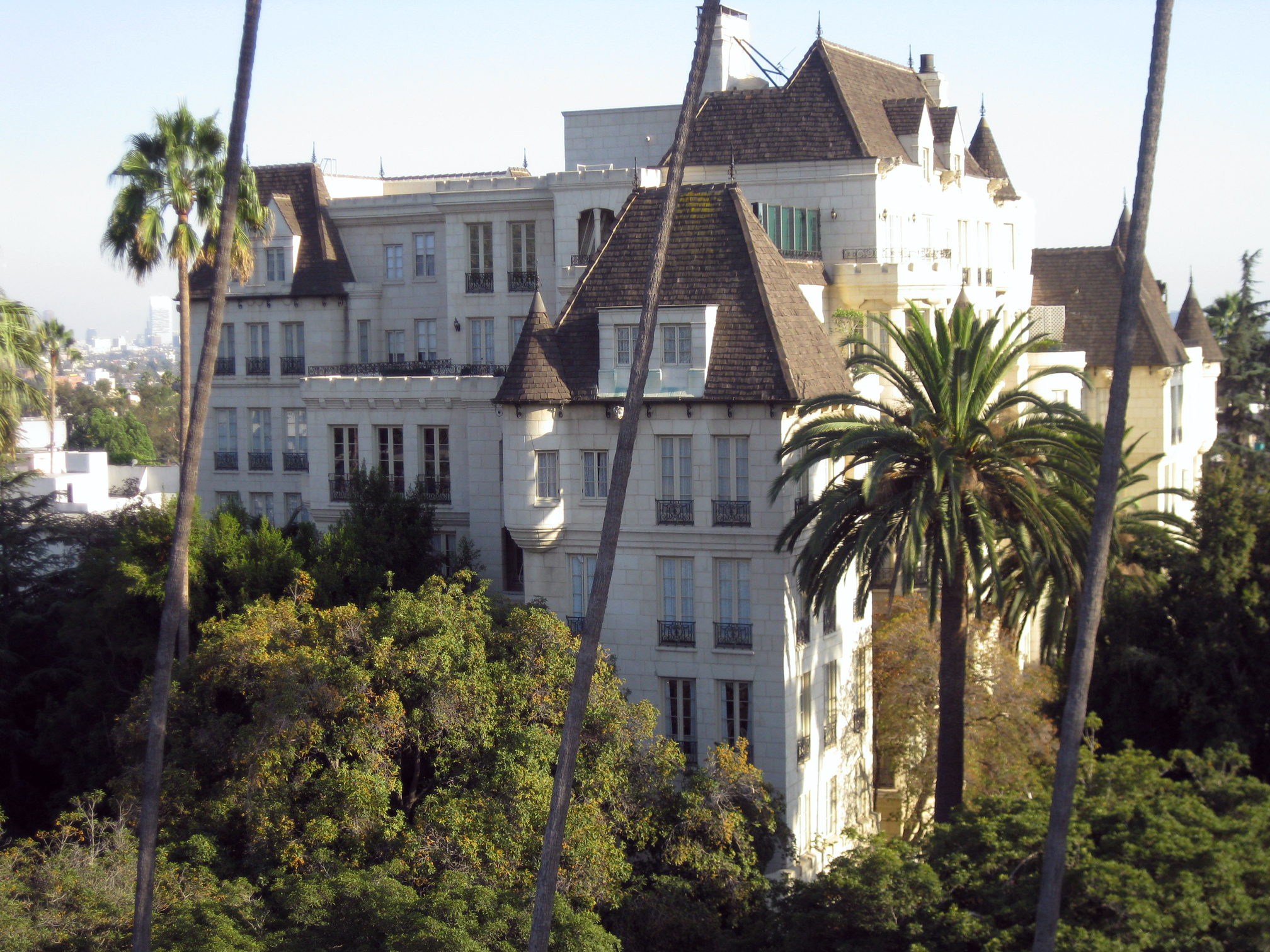
Château Élysée, location of the Celebrity Centre in Hollywood

The Church also owns historic buildings, including the 1927 hotel Château Élysée, remodeled as the Celebrity Center International, the 1923 Christie Hotel on Hollywood Boulevard which is now the Church of Scientology Information Center, a community center in South L.A., (a 1930s art deco building), and the Braley building in Pasadena, now a church, constructed in 1906 for Edgar Braley's bicycle emporium. In 2016, the Church opened the Scientology Media Productions, previously the KCET Studios. It was purchased from KCET in 2011 for $42 million ($56.3 million in 2025) and preserved as a Los Angeles Historic-Cultural Monument. Although Church spokesperson Karin Pouw has said that restoring buildings of historical significance is a way that the Church "gives back to the community", according to LA Weekly, former high-ranking Scientology officials claim that profit is the main reason why the studio was built, while the Church maintains its tax-free status.

== Other locations ==
Buildings in other countries are typically restored architectural landmarks. The Church also owns a 500-acre compound in Southern California, a cruise ship called the Freewinds and a 64,000 square-foot medieval-style castle and resort in South Africa.

== Expansion and fundraising ==
Scientology leader David Miscavige called for "massive expansion" following 9/11, leading to the purchase of even more buildings along with lucrative fundraising. For example, donations collected for the new Super Power Building in Clearwater were around $145 million, though the proposed construction costs were just $25 million. This led to the Ideal Org project in 2003, a building purchase-and-renovation plan which has been called "a real estate scam", a "money-making scheme", and "Scientology's principle cash cow". Many of the expensively renovated buildings remain empty or nearly so.

== Landmark sites program ==
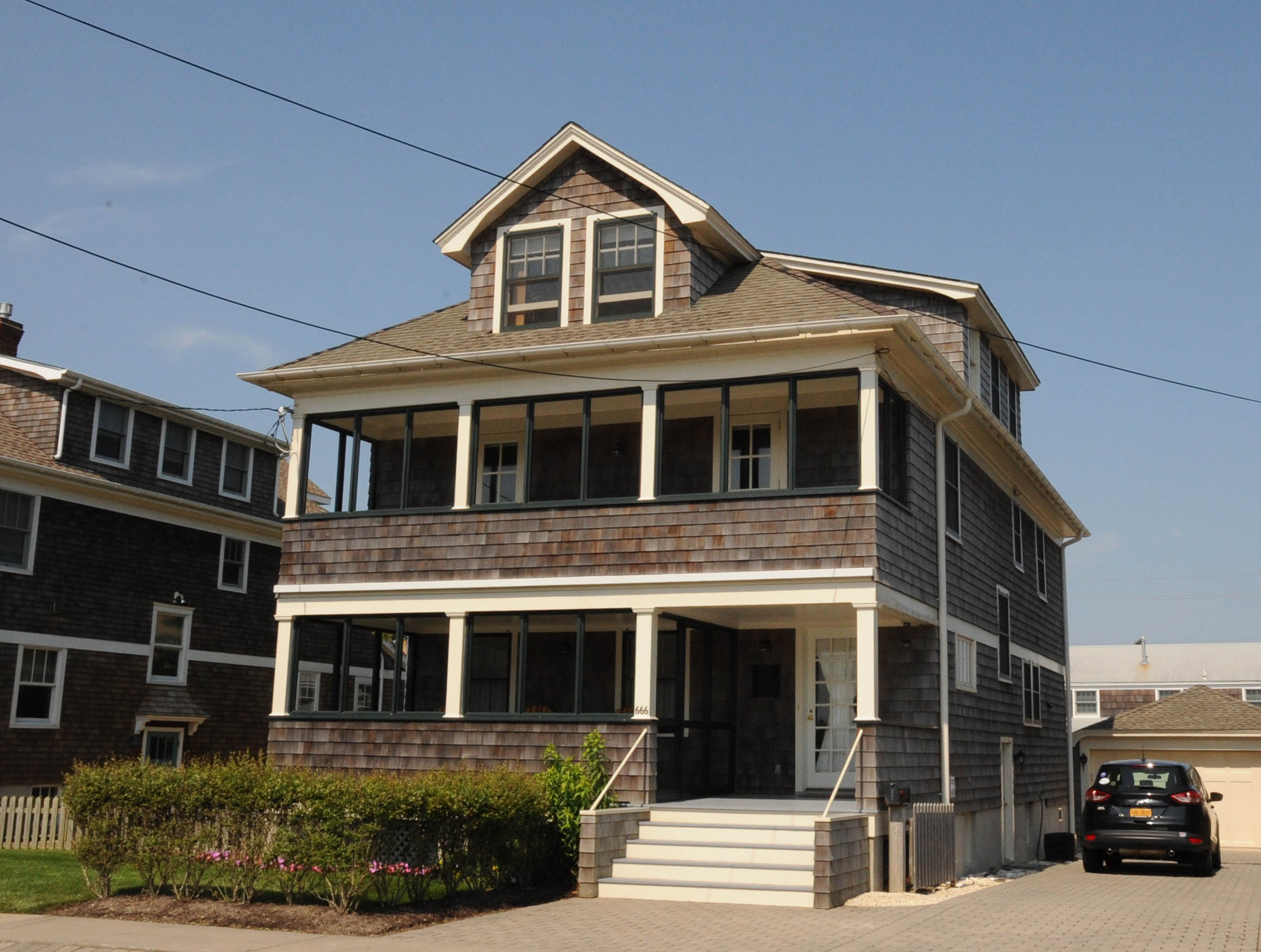
The L. Ron Hubbard residence at Bay Head, New Jersey

The L. Ron Hubbard Landmark Sites program is a Scientology-run initiative that restores and preserves buildings where L. Ron Hubbard lived, worked, or conducted Scientology-related activities. It is an internal branding and heritage program operated by the Church of Scientology, rather than an independently recognized preservation effort. According to Scientology publications, these sites are presented as historically significant within Scientology's internal narrative, and serve commemorative and promotional functions for the Church. They are set up like a writer's house museum and are not always open to the general public. As of 2026, Scientology listed nine such sites, including:

- Saint Hill Manor, England
- Fitzroy House, England
- Alexandra Park, Zimbabwe
- Linksfield Ridge, South Africa
- Original Founding Church of Scientology, Washington D.C.
- Osborn Road, Arizona
- Camelback House, Arizona
- Aberdeen Road, New Jersey
- Bay Head, New Jersey

== List of properties ==
=== United States ===
==== Florida ====
- Flag Land Base — Campus of numerous buildings known as "Scientology's international spiritual headquarters" in Clearwater
  - Atrium office tower at 601 Cleveland St, built 1985, bought in 2017 for $13M.
  - Clearwater Bank Building — 500 Cleveland St, built in 1918, bought in 1975. Used as an information center, and the Sea Org staff dining hall (in the rear).
  - Coachman Building — 503 Cleveland St, built 1917. Used for Scientology student classrooms.
  - Flag Building — Formerly known as the Super Power Building. Construction by COS began in 1996 and completed in 2013.
  - Fort Harrison Hotel — 1926 hotel in Clearwater. The original purchase by COS (along with the Clearwater Bank Building) when they "came ashore" in 1975.
  - Hacienda Gardens — A multiple-building apartment complex at 551 N Saturn Ave, built 1972, bought in 1986 for $4.6M. Used as Sea Org staff housing.
  - Mariner Hotel — 711 Cleveland St, built 1964, bought 1997 for $475K. Used as a hotel for COS members.
  - Oak Cove Hotel — 210 S Osceola Ave, 13-stories, built in 1975, bought in 2001 for $5M. Used as a hotel for parishioners at Flag.
  - Sherwood Garden Apartments — An eight building apartment complex at 1791 Sherwood St, built 1972, bought in 1999 for $4M. Used as Sea Org staff housing.
  - Yachtsman Hotel — 1024 Cleveland St, built 1970, bought 1979 for $950K. Used as a hotel for COS members.
- Ybor Factory Building — 1886 cigar factory in Tampa. Purchased in 2010.

==== California ====
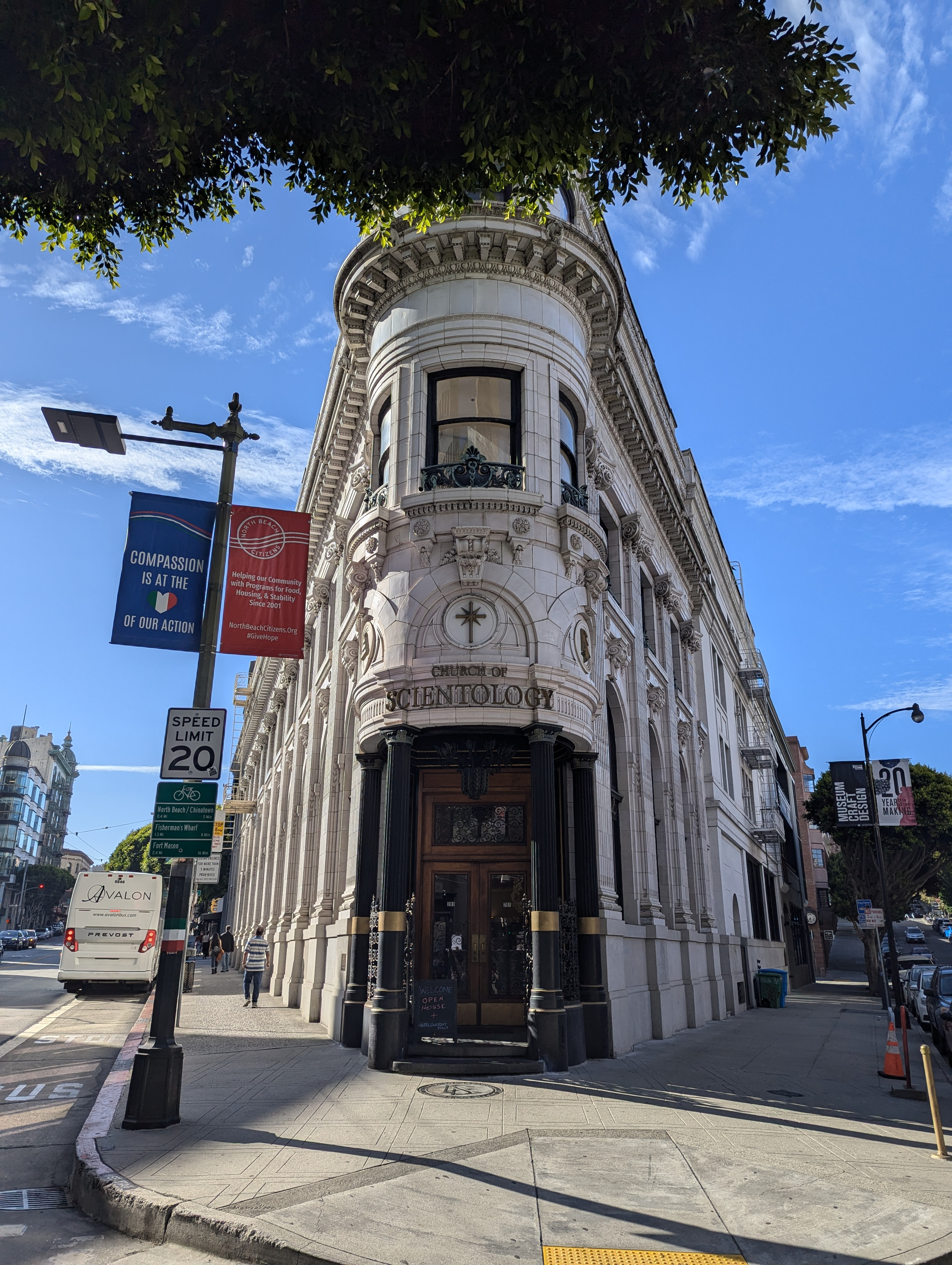
The Fugazi Bank Building in San Francisco

- Hollywood
  - Château Élysée — 1920s replica of a 17th-century French-Normandy chateau. Purchased in 1973, home to Celebrity Centre International.
  - Christie Hotel — 1922 building, used as an information center
  - El Cadiz Apartments — 1937 Spanish Colonial Revival apartment building
  - Guaranty Building — tall 1923 building, offices of many of international management departments, first floor is the L. Ron Hubbard Life Exhibition
  - Hollywood Congregational Church — 1920 building used by Association for Better Living and Education
  - KCET Studios — film studio which replaces much of Gold Base's filming and production facilities
  - PAC Base — "Big Blue", old hospital compound in Los Angeles containing multiple Church of Scientology organizations
  - Regal Shoes Building — 1939 building
  - Security Trust — 1928 building, used by Author Services
- Elsewhere
  - Fugazi Bank Building — 1909 classical revival building, home of the Church of Scientology of San Francisco
  - Gold Base — 500 acre campus in San Jacinto containing much of international management's crew including film production facilities
    - The Hole — a building on Gold Base which became used as a detention building

==== Other ====
- Fall School — 1898 building in Nashville, Tennessee. Houses the Church of Scientology & Celebrity Centre Nashville.
- Fraser Mansion — 1890 building in Washington, D.C.. Houses the National Affairs Office for the Church of Scientology
- L. Ron Hubbard House — Built 1904 in Washington, D.C. It was used by Hubbard and the Founding Church of Scientology from the mid-1950s to the mid-1970s, and was bought by the Church of Scientology in 2004 and turned into a writer's house museum.
- L. Ron Hubbard Residence at Bay Head — New Jersey, built c. 1910. Hubbard lived there 1949-50 and wrote Dianetics: The Modern Science of Mental Health. Bought by the Church of Scientology and turned into a writers museum.
- One Griswold Street — Michigan. Purchased in 2007, houses the Church of Scientology Detroit.
- Trementina Base — New Mexico

=== Other countries ===
- Alhambra Cinema — 1937 Art Deco style building in Tel Aviv, Israel. Purchased in 2010 as the Ideal Center of Scientology for the Middle East.
- Castle Kyalami — 1992 castle in South Africa, originally a tourist attraction and hotel. Purchased in 2008, marking it the 66th global purchase.
- Freewinds — A cruise ship that operates in the Caribbean
- Hockley Highlands Inn — 200-acre resort property in Canada, purchased in 2009 and left idle
- Saint Hill Manor — An English country house and 55-acre campus in East Grinstead, England
