= Kyalami (disambiguation) =

Kyalami (or Kyalami Grand Prix Circuit) is a racetrack in Midrand, Gauteng, South Africa.

Kyalami can also refer to:

== Places ==
- Kyalami Agricultural Holdings, a suburb in Midrand, South Africa
- Kyalami Estates, a gated suburb in Midrand, South Africa
- Kyalami Business Park, a gated suburb in Midrand, South Africa
- Kyalami Castle, a castle in Midrand, Gauteng, South Africa; owned by the Church of Scientology

== Other uses ==
- Maserati Kyalami, an Italian sports car.
- Kyalami 9 Hours, an endurance race for sports cars at the Kyalami Circuit

== See also ==
- South African Grand Prix at Kyalami, Midrang, Gauteng
