= List of Kyalami Grand Prix Circuit fatalities =

This is a list of fatal accidents to competitors, officials and public at the Kyalami Grand Prix Circuit during the South African Grand Prix and other national and international motor-sport events.

== List of fatal accidents involving competitors ==
No.	Competitor	Date of incident	Location of incident on track	Vehicle type	Race	Incident description
1 (Note: Many records show that the first fatality was Peter Engelbrecht in 1963 in the Esses driving a Porsche 550 Spyder. This in incorrect, as Engelbrecht was indeed involved in a serious accident in 1963, but survived. He died of natural causes on 15 March 1976.)	Zunia Leibavicius	13 Sep 1965	The Kink	Lotus 11	Kyalami Club races	Leibavicius suffered extensive burns during a sports-car club race after being doused with fluid from a leaking fuel cap. He stopped the car but fire marshals were too slow in coming to his assistance. He was badly burned and died the next day in a Johannesburg hospital.
2	(South Africa) Paul Richards	28 May 1966	Jukskei Sweep	Porsche 550 Spyder	1966 South African Sports Car Championship round no. 6	Richards was driving a famous Porsche 550 Spyder and stalled at the start. (Note: Porsche only built 90 RS 550 Spyders between 1952 and 1956. South African named Ian Fraser-Jones bought one of these cars and brought to South Africa where he raced it for a while. It was then sold to Dr. Dawie Gous who was also an amateur racing driver. Gous won the 1961 Kyalami 9 Hours race as overall winner with John Love and as Class B winner and third overall in the 1962 Kayalami 9 Hours race, partnered with Al Klesse. In 1963 Gous sold, what was then a famous South African racing car, to sports car driver Peter Engelbrecht, who Gous partnered in the 1963 Kyalami 9 Hours race. During the race Engelbrecht lost control of the car in the Esses due to stuck throttle and the car hit an embankment and burst into flames. The car was very badly damaged by fire and Engelbrecht was seriously injured. Three years later, the car was bought and restored by Paul Richards.) Once he got started he was at the back of the field and lost control of the Porsche at the Jukskei Sweep. He crashed into a pole, killing him on impact.
3	(South Africa) Douglas Norton	15 April 1972	First Esses bend	Honda 350	Club production motorcycle races	On first lap of the race, he was hit by a fellow competitor as they entered the first of the Esses, causing him to lose control of his Honda 350cc motorcycle. He hit the earth bank on the inside of the track and was killed instantly.
4	(South Africa) Brian Ferreira	3 Sep 1972	Crowthorne Corner	Mini Cooper S	1972 RDM 9 Hour race Practice	During practice for the race, Ferreira spun his Mini Cooper S when he hit a sudden downpour. The car hit the Armco in Crowthorn Corner after which Ferreira got out of the car and was then hit by a fellow competitor caught by the same downpour. He died from his injuries later that night.
5	(United States) Peter Revson	22 March 1974	Barbecue Bend	Shadow DN3 - Cosworth	Testing Session prior to 1974 South African Grand Prix	Revson lost control of his car on the approach to Barbecue Bend and crashed into the barriers at around 220 kilometres per hour (140 mph). The Shadow caught fire on impact and was totally destroyed, with Revson being unable to exit the car. Graham Hill, Eddie Keizan, Emerson Fittipaldi and Denny Hulme stopped their cars and vainly tried to retrieve Revson from the burning wreckage. It was reported that a possible cause of the crash was the left front titanium suspension upright having collapsed.
6	(United Kingdom) Tom Pryce	5 March 1977	Pit-Straight/Crowthorne Bend	Shadow DN8 - Cosworth	1977 South African Grand Prix	The Shadow DN8 of Renzo Zorzi had stopped opposite on the main straight and was on fire. Two marshals ran across the track with fire extinguishers to put out the fire. Pryce was slipstreaming Hans Joachim Stuck down the straight to a crest opposite the pit area and on cresting the hill, Stuck saw the fire marshals and had adequate time avoid them while Pryce was unable to do so. Pryce hit the one marshal, flailing him into the air and killing him instantly. The 18.2 kilograms (40 lb) fire extinguisher carried by the marshal struck Pryce on his helmet, killing him upon impact as well.
7	(South Africa) Johan Boshoff	11 June 1977	Jukskei Sweep	Yamaha 0W31	Practice for 1977 Republic Trophy Races	Boshoff crashed his works Yamaha during early morning practice. He was rushed to hospital with a badly broken leg as his worst injury but was later impacted by an embolism that affected his heart. He died six days later in hospital.
8	(South Africa) Keith Petersen	10 Oct 1982	Leeukop	Ducati Pantah 500cc	Superbike Race	On a wet day, Petersen lost control of his bike while attempting to avoid a collapsed rider. He crashed at Leeukop bend after colliding with another rider. Petersen was awarded the South African Championship title posthumously.
9	(South Africa) John Martin Sneesby	28 Jan 1984	Barbecue Bend	Honda 750	Production motorcycle race	Sneesby died after crashing into a guardrail in Barbeque Bend. Jan Dirksen was killed in a separate race on the same day.
10	(Netherlands) Jan Dirksen	28 Jan 1984	Esses		Production motorcycles race	Injured in crash during same race as John Sneesby above. Unknown if he died in the crash or afterwards.
11	(South Africa) Mark Welthagen	25 May 1990	Arwa Corner	Yamaha FZR 750	Practice for Yellow Pages Challenge of 26 May 1990	Welthagen lost control of his bike entering the corner and hit the inside curb before crashing into straw bales on the outside of the track. Welthagen was flown to Johannesburg General Hospital and died several hours after being admitted.
12	(South Africa) George Jeroudis	29 Aug 1992	Total Corner (end of pit straight)	Kawasaki ZX	1992 Kyalami Spring Meeting Superbike Race	Jeroudis' bike left the circuit on lap two of the race going into Total Corner at an estimated speed of 260 kilometres per hour (160 mph) and crashed into a concrete retaining wall.
13	(South Africa) Brett MacLeod	28 March 1999	Gestetner Corner	Suzuki 600	1999 FIM World Supersport Championship race	MacLeod was leading the race when his bike stalled and then restarted as he came out of the final chicane. MacLeod fell into the path of an oncoming rider, who couldn't avoid impact. MacLeod was rushed to hospital, where he died shortly after admission.
14	(South Africa) Warren Banfield	9 February 2013	Start line	Kawasaki ZX10	Festival of Speed Kyalami Grand Prix Circuit: Zwartkops Brunch Run Challenge	48-year-old bike rider Warren Banfield was killed in a pile-up at the open of the day's second Brunch Run Challenge. Banfield was hit by a number of other bikes. Six other riders were also injured, one of them in critical condition.
15	(South Africa) Marco Pugi	9 February 2013	Mineshaft	Suzuki GSXR 1000	Festival of Speed Kyalami Grand Prix Circuit: Thunderbike Series	Pugi touched wheels with another competitor at high speeds, resulting in both riders crashing. He was taken to a hospital in Sunninghill, Gauteng, where he died the following morning.

== List of fatal accidents involving officials ==
No.	Official	Role	Date of incident	Race	Location of incident on track	Vehicle involved	Driver involved	Incident description
1	(South Africa) Frederick Jansen van Vuuren	Marshal	5 March 1977	1977 South African Grand Prix	Pit-Straight	Shadow DN8	(United Kingdom) Tom Pryce	van Vuuren was a junior fire marshal in the pit lane. While crossing the track with another marshal to extinguish a fire that had engulfed Renzo Zorzi's vehicle, he was struck by Tom Pryce, who was unable to see van Vuuren. The impact killed van Vuuren instantly, while his fire extinguisher smashed into Pryce, killing him as well.

== List of fatal accidents involving spectators ==
No.	Person	Date of incident	Race	Location of incident on track	Vehicle involved	Driver involved	Incident description
1	Name unknown	8 November 1969	1969 Nine Hours of Kyalami	Clubhouse Corner	Porsche 908/02	(Germany) Willi Kauhsen	About 21h30 spectator climbed the safety fence and ran onto the track in the dark, where they were subsequently fatally struck by Kauhsen's 908. (Note: The car was badly damaged in the accident and was forced to withdraw from competition with Kauhsen-Schultze classified in eighth place overall. Kauhsen and Schultze's Porsche 908/02 did not race again in the series.)
