= Kyalami Superbike World Championship round =

Kyalami Superbike World Championship round may refer to:

- 1999 Kyalami Superbike World Championship round
- 2002 Kyalami Superbike World Championship round
- 2009 Kyalami Superbike World Championship round
- 2010 Kyalami Superbike World Championship round

== See also ==
- Kyalami Circuit
- Kyalami (disambiguation)
