= 1995 Birkin Cars/TVR Invitational Race =

Race details
- Date: 29 January 1995
- Official name: Birkin Cars/TVR Invitational Race
- Location: Kyalami Grand Prix Circuit
- Course: Asphalt
- Course length: 4.26 km (4.26 miles)
- Distance: 35 laps, 149.135 km (93.209 miles)

Pole position
Driver	(Sweden) Kenny Bräck	Madgwick International
- Time: 1:27.670

Podium
First	(Netherlands) Jan Lammers	Vortex Motorsport
Second	(Sweden) Kenny Bräck	Madgwick International
Third	(United Kingdom) Richard Dean	Madgwick International
- Lap leaders: Jan Lammers (1-35)

The 1995 Birkin Cars/TVR Invitational Race was a non-championship Formula 3000 race held at the Kyalami Grand Prix Circuit in South Africa. Jan Lammers won the race after passing polesitter Kenny Bräck in the first turn.

== Summary ==
Number two starter Jan Lammers had a very good start and passed polesitter Kenny Bräck for the lead in the opening lap. Lammers opened up a gap towards Bräck having a seven-second advantage at one point. South African driver Stephen Watson was running in fourth place until he tried to overtake Richard Dean. This resulted in Watson losing two spots. Less than a lap later he went off course attempting to overtake another driver. He damaged his rear wing and had to retire. Near the end of the race Bräck was closing in on Lammers. But as he attempted a pass for the lead the Swedish driver spun. As he completed a perfect 360 degree spin he did not lose a spot but could not threaten Lammers for the win.

== Classification ==
=== Qualifying ===
Pos	Driver	Team	Constructor	Time
1	(Sweden) Kenny Bräck	Madgwick International	Reynard 94D-Judd	1:27.670
2	(Netherlands) Jan Lammers	Vortex Motorsport	Reynard 94D-Cosworth	1:27.670
3	(Brazil) Tarso Marques	Vortex Motorsport	Reynard 94D-Cosworth	1:28.142
4	(United Kingdom) Phil Andrews	Apache Racing	Reynard 93D-Cosworth	1:28.553
5	(Germany) Sascha Maassen	Team Monninghoff	Reynard 93D-Cosworth	1:28.627
6	(United Kingdom) Richard Dean	Madgwick International	Reynard 92D-Cosworth	1:29.175
7	(South Africa) Stephen Watson	Nordic Racing	Lola T94/50-Cosworth	1:29.277
8	(Germany) Klaus Panchyrz	Team Monninghoff	Reynard 92D-Cosworth	1:29.414
9	(United Kingdom) Dino Morelli	Omegaland International	Reynard 94D-Judd	1:29.474
10	(United Kingdom) Gareth Rees	Omegaland International	Reynard 94D-Judd	1:29.670
11	(South Africa) Hilton Cowie	Nordic Racing	Lola T94/50-Cosworth	1:29.847
12	(Finland) Pekka Herva	Fred Goddard Racing	Reynard 91D-Cosworth	1:31.078
13	(United Kingdom) Dominic Chappell	Apache Racing	Reynard 93D-Cosworth	1:31.369
14	(United Kingdom) Nigel Smith	Team Schemes	Reynard 92D-Cosworth	1:31.628
15	(Italy) Guido Dacco	Weylock Racing	Reynard 91D-Cosworth	1:33.008
16	(South Africa) Iain Pepper	Fred Goddard Racing	Reynard 90D-Cosworth	1:33.173
17	(Austria) Frederico Careca	Weylock Racing	Reynard 93D-Cosworth	1:33.223
18	(United Kingdom) David Mercer	Weylock Racing	Reynard 92D-Cosworth	1:38.119

=== Race result ===
Pos	Driver	Team	Constructor	Laps	Time/Retired
1	(Netherlands) Jan Lammers	Vortex Motorsport	Reynard 94D-Cosworth	35	53:15.833
2	(Sweden) Kenny Bräck	Madgwick International	Reynard 94D-Judd	35	53:18.130
3	(United Kingdom) Richard Dean	Madgwick International	Reynard 92D-Cosworth	35	53:57.773
4	(United Kingdom) Gareth Rees	Omegaland International	Reynard 94D-Judd	35	54:02.119
5	(United Kingdom) Dino Morelli	Omegaland International	Reynard 94D-Judd	35	54:02.981
6	(South Africa) Hilton Cowie	Nordic Racing	Lola T94/50-Cosworth	35	54:20.451
7	(Finland) Pekka Herva	Fred Goddard Racing	Reynard 91D-Cosworth	35	54:38.463
8	(Germany) Sascha Maassen	Team Monninghoff	Reynard 93D-Cosworth	34	Out of fuel
9	(United Kingdom) Dominic Chappell	Apache Racing	Reynard 93D-Cosworth	34	Running
10	(Austria) Frederico Careca	Weylock Racing	Reynard 93D-Cosworth	34	Running
11	(Italy) Guido Dacco	Weylock Racing	Reynard 91D-Cosworth	34	Running
12	(Brazil) Tarso Marques	Vortex Motorsport	Reynard 94D-Cosworth	33	Spin
13	(Germany) Klaus Panchyrz	Team Monninghoff	Reynard 92D-Cosworth	32	Out of fuel
14	(United Kingdom) David Mercer	Weylock Racing	Reynard 92D-Cosworth	32	Running
Ret	(United Kingdom) Phil Andrews	Apache Racing	Reynard 93D-Cosworth	29	Spin
Ret	(United Kingdom) Nigel Smith	Team Schemes	Reynard 92D-Cosworth	13	Input shaft
Ret	(South Africa) Stephen Watson	Nordic Racing	Lola T94/50-Cosworth	8	Accident
DNS	(South Africa) Iain Pepper	Fred Goddard Racing	Reynard 90D-Cosworth	0	Ignition
