= 2027 Kyalami 24 Hours =

(South Africa) 2027 Kyalami 24 Hours
Event Information
- Round {{{round_no}}} of {{{season_no}}} in the [[ ]]
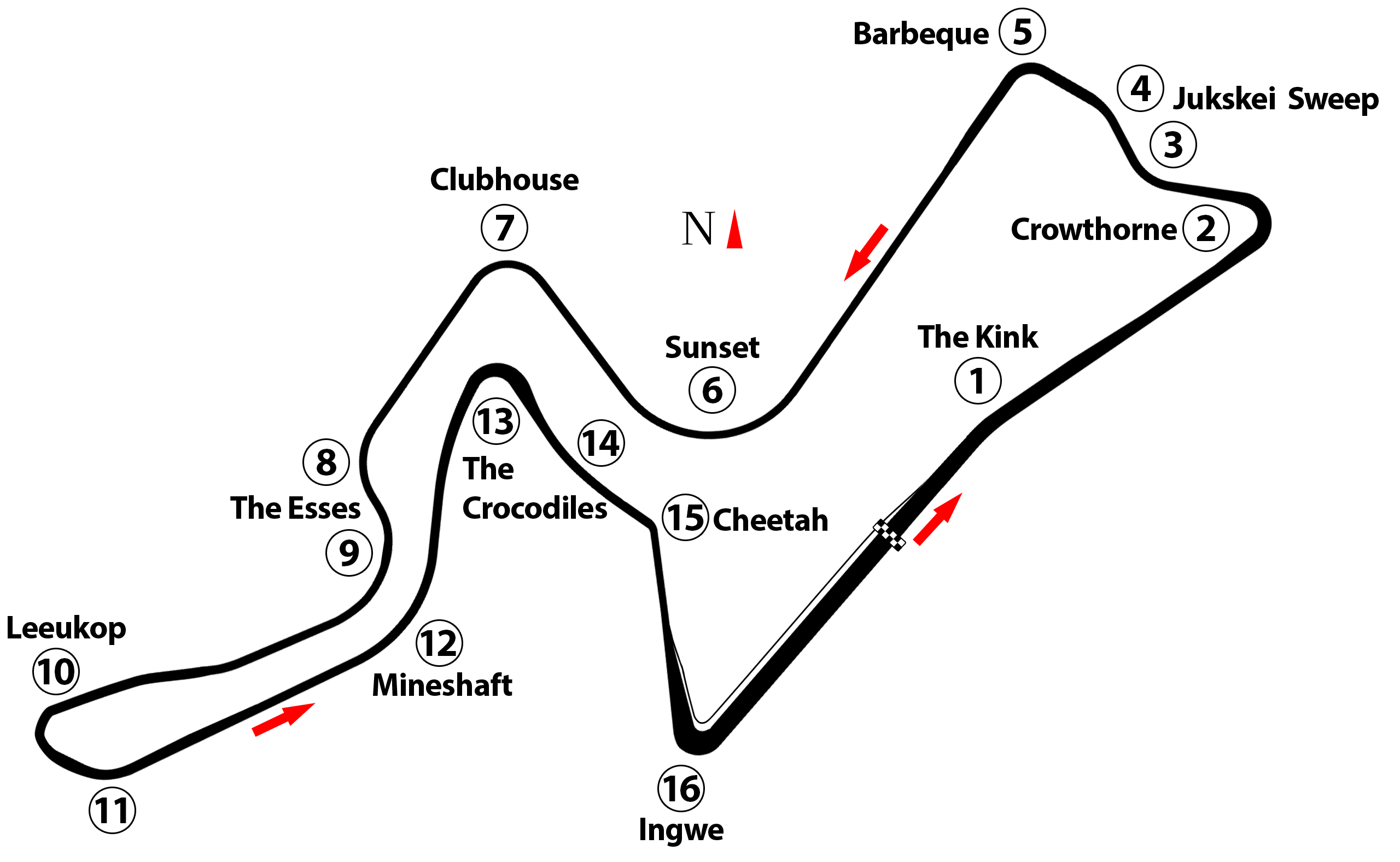
- Date: 8–10 January 2027
- Location: Midrand, Gauteng, South Africa
- Venue: Kyalami Grand Prix Circuit

Results
Race 1
Distance	laps	km

The 2027 Michelin Kyalami 24 Hours will be the inaugural running of the Kyalami 24 Hours, a motorsport endurance race at the Kyalami Grand Prix Circuit in Midrand, South Africa. The race will be held from 8 to 10 January 2027.

== Teams and drivers ==
No.	Entrant	Car	Class	Driver 1	Driver 2	Driver 3	Driver 4	Driver 5
GT3 (14 entries)
8	(Germany) Car Collection Motorsport	Porsche 911 GT3 R (992.2)		TBA	TBA	TBA	TBA	TBA
24	(Germany) GetSpeed Performance	Mercedes-AMG GT3 Evo	Am	(United States) Alexandra Hainer	(United States) Tanner Harvey	(Luxembourg) Steve Jans	(United States) Patrick Liddy	(Germany) Adam Osieka
26	(France) Saintéloc Racing	Audi R8 LMS Evo II		TBA	TBA	TBA	TBA	TBA
37	(South Africa) MJR Motorsport	Audi R8 LMS Evo II		TBA	TBA	TBA	TBA	TBA
42	(United Kingdom) Century Motorsport	BMW M4 GT3 Evo		TBA	TBA	TBA	TBA	TBA
44	(Slovakia) ARC Bratislava	Lamborghini Huracán GT3 Evo 2		TBA	TBA	TBA	TBA	TBA
63	(South Africa) Into Africa Racing	Lamborghini Huracán GT3 Evo 2		TBA	TBA	TBA	TBA	TBA
65	(Malaysia) Viper 65 Racing Team	Mercedes-AMG GT3 Evo		TBA	TBA	TBA	TBA	TBA
69	(United Arab Emirates) Continental Racing by Simpson Motorsport	Audi R8 LMS Evo II		TBA	TBA	TBA	TBA	TBA
86	(Austria) Baron Motorsport	Ferrari 296 GT3 Evo		TBA	TBA	TBA	TBA	TBA
91	(Germany) Herberth Motorsport	Porsche 911 GT3 R (992.2)		TBA	TBA	TBA	TBA	TBA
123	(Belgium) Mühlner Motorsport	Porsche 911 GT3 R (992.2)		TBA	TBA	TBA	TBA	TBA
914	(Austria) Razoon – more than racing	Porsche 911 GT3 R (992.2)		TBA	TBA	TBA	TBA	TBA
TBA	(Belgium) Comtoyou Racing	Aston Martin Vantage AMR GT3 Evo		TBA	TBA	TBA	TBA	TBA
GTX (4 entries)
701	(France) Vortex V8	Vortex 2.0		TBA	TBA	TBA	TBA	TBA
702	(France) Vortex V8	Vortex 2.0		TBA	TBA	TBA	TBA	TBA
710	(Germany) Leipert Motorsport	Lamborghini Huracán Super Trofeo Evo 2		TBA	TBA	TBA	TBA	TBA
778	(Belgium) SpeedLover	Porsche 992 GT3 Cup (992.1)		TBA	TBA	TBA	TBA	TBA
992 (9 entries)
888	(France) SebLajoux Racing	Porsche 992 GT3 Cup (992.1)		TBA	TBA	TBA	TBA	TBA
909	(Netherlands) Red Camel-Jordans.nl	Porsche 992 GT3 Cup (992.2)		TBA	TBA	TBA	TBA	TBA
910	(France) SebLajoux Racing	Porsche 992 GT3 Cup (992.1)		TBA	TBA	TBA	TBA	TBA
918	(Belgium) Mühlner Motorsport	Porsche 992 GT3 Cup (992.2)		TBA	TBA	TBA	TBA	TBA
921	(Belgium) Mühlner Motorsport	Porsche 992 GT3 Cup (992.1)		TBA	TBA	TBA	TBA	TBA
937	(South Africa) MJR Motorsport	Porsche 992 GT3 Cup (992.1)		TBA	TBA	TBA	TBA	TBA
TBA	(France) GP Racing Team	Porsche 992 GT3 Cup (992.2)		TBA	TBA	TBA	TBA	TBA
TBA	(Japan) SHR ABSSA by Seblajoux Racing	Porsche 992 GT3 Cup (992.1)		TBA	TBA	TBA	TBA	TBA
GT4 (4 entries)
444	(France) Circuit Toys	Toyota GR Supra GT4 Evo2		TBA	TBA	TBA	TBA	TBA
TBA	(France) Circuit Toys	Toyota GR Supra GT4 Evo2		TBA	TBA	TBA	TBA	TBA
TBA	(South Africa) Team Africa Le Mans	Ginetta G55 GT4		TBA	TBA	TBA	TBA	TBA
TBA	(South Africa) Team Africa Le Mans	Ginetta G55 GT4		TBA	TBA	TBA	TBA	TBA
TCE/TCX (6 entries)
101	(Germany) asBest Racing	Cupra León TCR		TBA	TBA	TBA	TBA	TBA
111	(Germany) asBest Racing	Porsche 718 Cayman GT4 CS (982)		TBA	TBA	TBA	TBA	TBA
178	(United Kingdom) CWS Engineering	Ginetta G55 GT4		TBA	TBA	TBA	TBA	TBA
278	(United Kingdom) CWS Engineering	Ginetta G56 GT4 Evo		TBA	TBA	TBA	TBA	TBA
TBA	(Germany) Team Sorg Rennsport	Porsche 718 Cayman GT4 CS (982)		TBA	TBA	TBA	TBA	TBA
TBA	(Germany) Team Sorg Rennsport	Porsche 718 Cayman GT4 CS (982)		TBA	TBA	TBA	TBA	TBA

GT3 entries
Icon	Class
P	GT3-Pro
PA	GT3-Pro Am
Am	GT3-Am
992 entries
Icon	Class
P	992-Pro
Am	992-Am
TC entries
Icon	Class
TC	TC
TX	TCX
