= Francis Tucker =

- Nationality: South African citizenship
- Born: 30 April 1923 Johannesburg, Transvaal South Africa
- Died: 4 April 2008 (aged 84) Somerset West, Western Cape, South Africa

Championship titles
- 1966: South African Rally Drivers Championship

Awards
- 1966 2002: Springbok Colours; MSA Lifetime Achievement Award

Francis Bagnal Kidger Tucker (30 April 1923 – 4 April 2008) was a South African rally driver, who was the 1966 South African Rally Drivers Champion.

Tucker was heavily involved with the development of the Kyalami racetrack and served as Steward for all the Grand Prix events at Kyalami until SAMRAC sold the circuit. He was also involved with the organization of the Castrol International Rally and a recipient of the Motorsport South African (MSA) Lifetime Achievement award.

Sporting positions
Preceded by EL van Bergen	SA Rally Driverschampionship; 1966	Succeeded by Jan Hettema
