= Hockley Highlands Inn =

Building in Mono, Ontario, Canada

Hockley Highlands Inn and Conference Centre
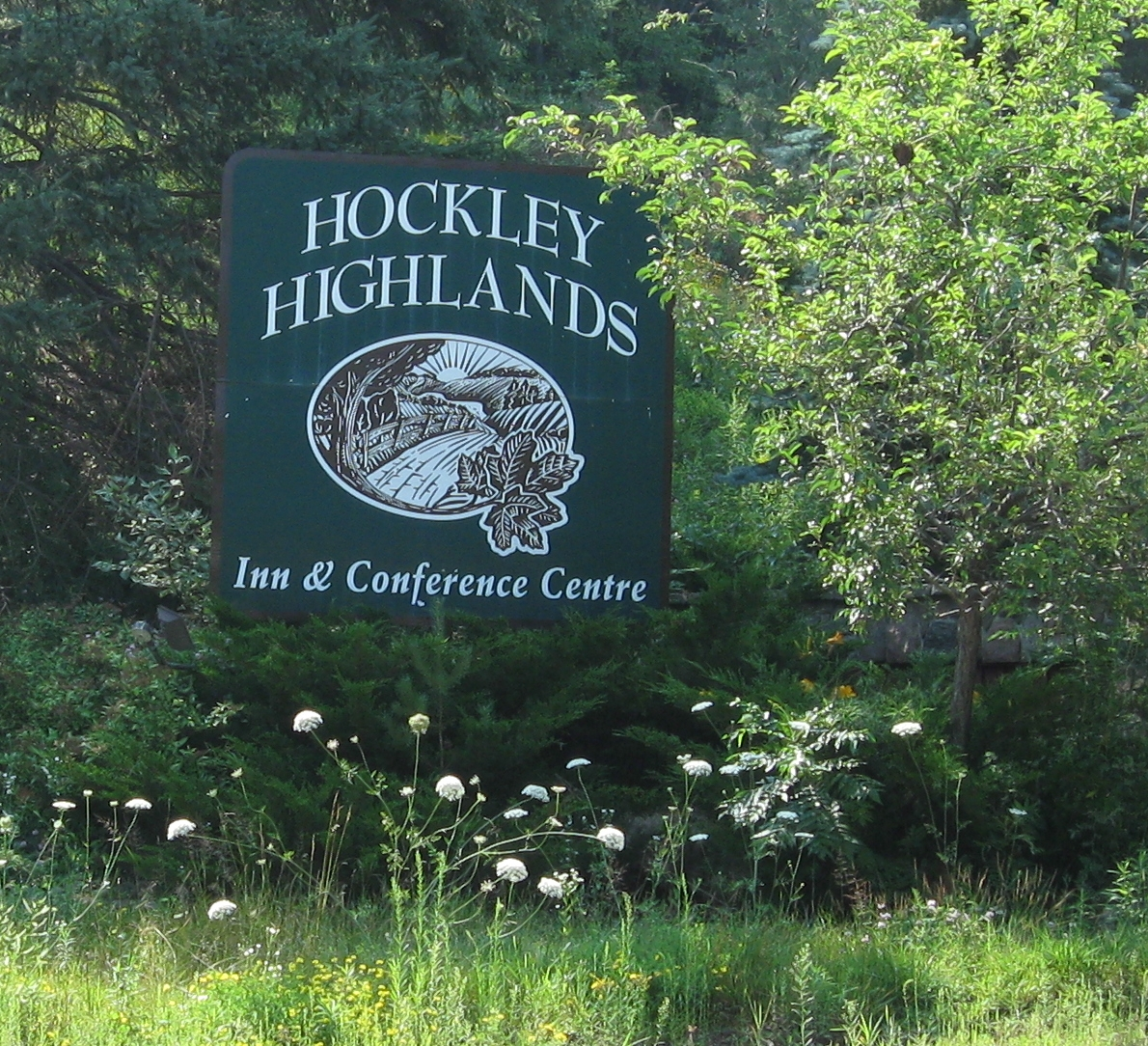

General information
- Location: Mono, Ontario
- Coordinates: 43°58′28.54″N 80°2′8.83″W
- Opening: Late 1990s
- Closed: 2007-05-18
- Owner: Goldman Hotels Inc.

Design and construction
- Developer: Ontario Hydro

Other information
- Number of rooms: 174

The Hockley Highlands Inn and Conference Centre, on the East side of 3rd Line Road, Mono, Ontario, south of Dufferin County Road 7 (Hockley Road), opposite the Hockley Valley Resort, is a hotel and conference centre with 5 main buildings on 200 acres (0.81 km^{2}) of forested land sloping towards the Hockley Valley. It has been closed to the public since May 2007.

== History ==
Originally built in the 1960s by Ontario Hydro for internal corporate use as the Glen Cross Conference and Training Centre. It was sold to Goldman Hotels Inc. in the late 1990s and opened as public hotel, catering mainly to large conferences and local functions such as weddings. In May 2007, it was abruptly closed. From 2003 to 2007, the inn donated space to Theatre Orangeville, which used 5,000 square feet (460 m^{2}) of space for set design, prop storage and rehearsal space.

=== Scientology ===
In 2009 the property was purchased by the Church of Scientology Canada who plans to establish a national headquarters and retreat site there.

== Niagara Escarpment ==
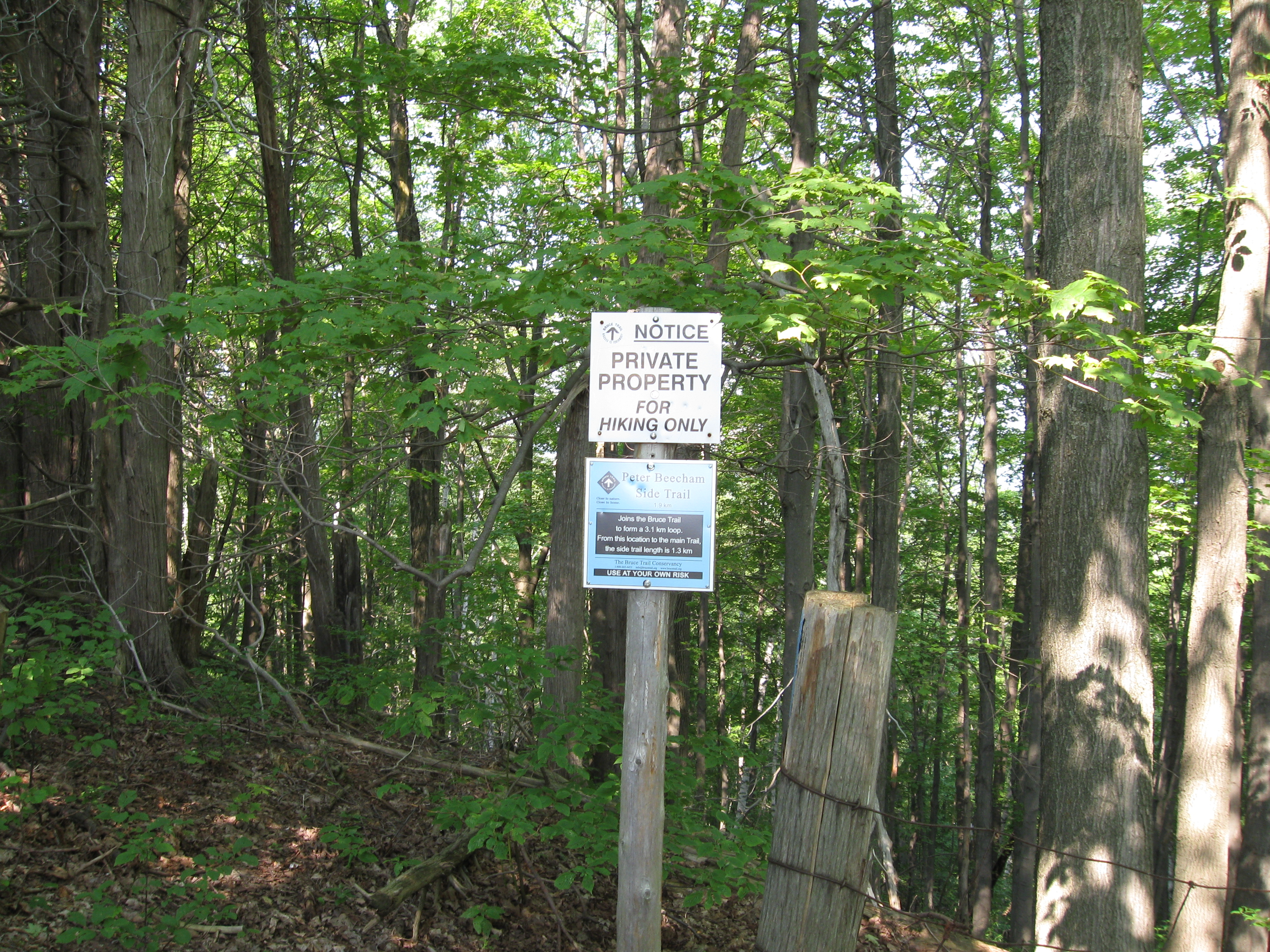
Entrance to Peter Beecham Side Trail

The property is located on the Niagara Escarpment and classified as Escarpment Protection Area by the Niagara Escarpment Commission, which limits use and development. In April 2004, an application was made for an amendment to rezone the property to Escarpment Recreation Area, and re-applied for in May 2008.

The main Bruce Trail hiking trail runs through the property, as well as the Peter Beecham Side Trail. A Scientology representative said that they have no plans to alter the existing Bruce Trail.
