= One Griswold Street =

High-rise building in Detroit, United States

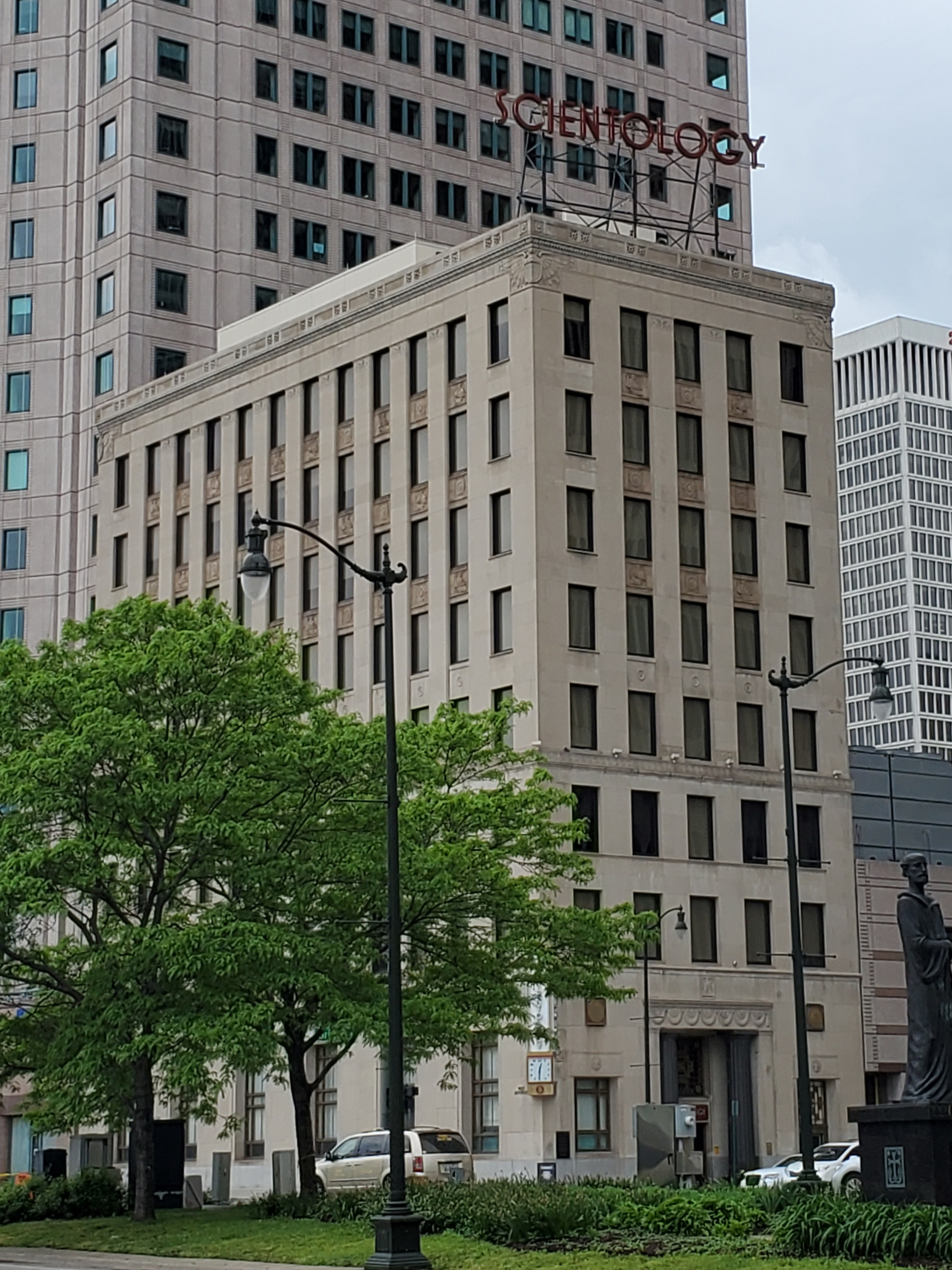
- The building in 2022
- Interactive map of the One Griswold Street area
- Former names: Standard Savings Building; Raymond James Building
- Alternative names: Church of Scientology Detroit

General information
- Type: High-rise
- Architectural style: Neoclassical
- Location: 1 Griswold Street, Detroit, Michigan, United States
- Coordinates: 42°19′42.5″N 83°02′45.5″W
- Completed: 1927
- Renovated: 2017 – October 15, 2018
- Owner: Church of Scientology

Height
- Architectural: 122 feet (37 m)
- Roof: 110 feet (34 m)

Technical details
- Material: Concrete; Limestone
- Floor count: 9
- Floor area: 50,000 square feet (4,600 m^{2})

Design and construction
- Architect: George D. Mason

Renovating team
- Main contractor: Roncelli, Inc.
- One Griswold Street
- U.S. Historic district – Contributing property
- Part of: Detroit Financial District (ID09001067)
- Added to NRHP: December 14, 2009

One Griswold Street (formerly also known as the Standard Savings Building and the Raymond James Building) is a high-rise building in the Financial District of Detroit, Michigan, United States. The building sits at the intersection of Griswold Street and West Jefferson Avenue, on the same city block occupied by 150 West Jefferson. Since 2007, the building has been owned by the Church of Scientology, which operates the building as the Church of Scientology Detroit. Between 2017 and 2018, the building underwent a renovation that restored much of its interior appearance, including a grand staircase and mezzanine for the first and second floors.

== Site ==
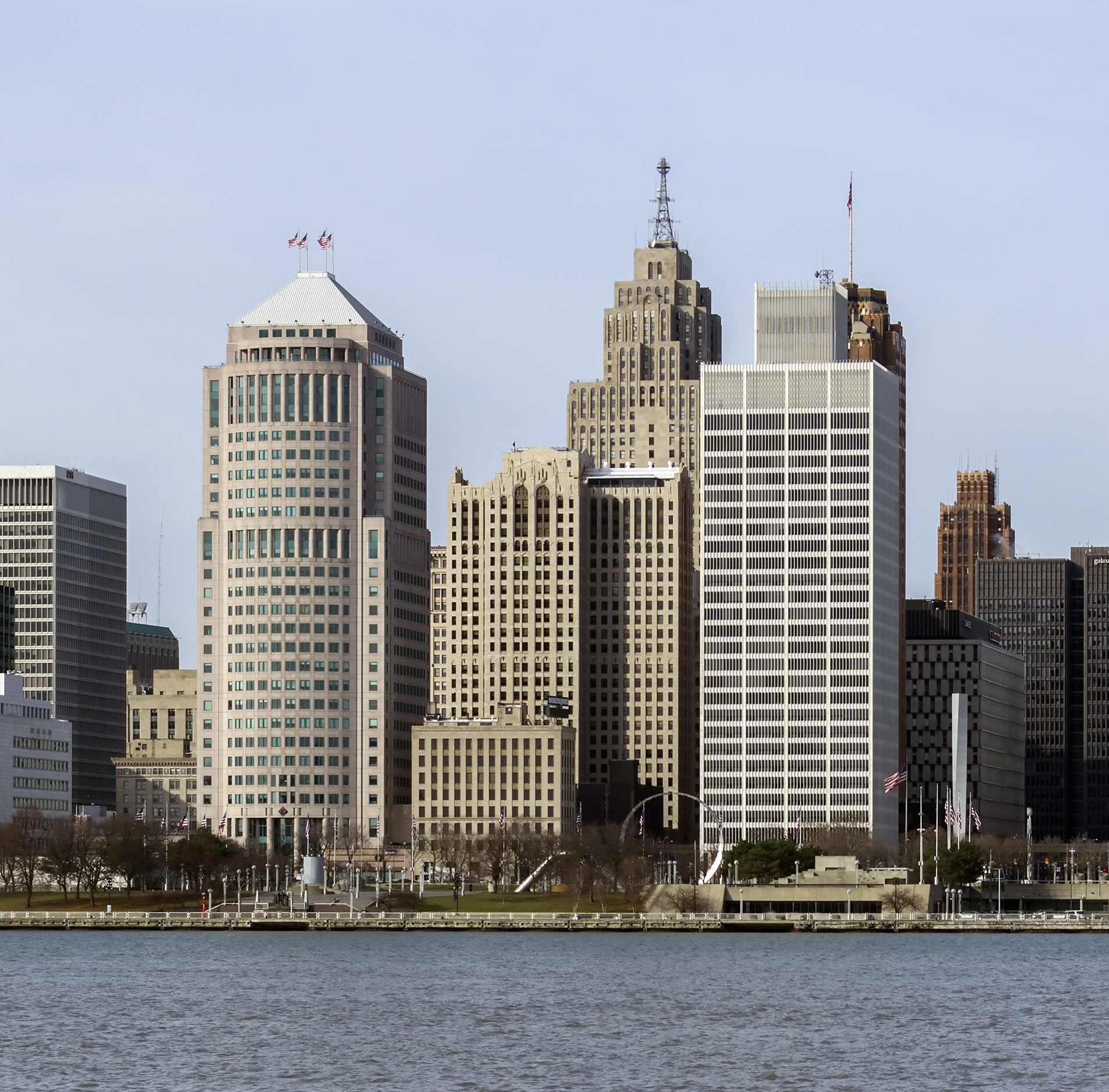
A partial skyline view of Detroit in 2014, with One Griswold Street in the center

One Griswold Street is located at the intersection of Griswold Street and West Jefferson Avenue in the Financial District of downtown Detroit. Nearby buildings include 150 West Jefferson, located adjacent to One Griswold Street on the same city block, and One Woodward Avenue, across Griswold Street. Philip A. Hart Plaza is located across Jefferson Avenue from the building. The site is historically notable as the location of the first church founded in the city of Detroit, Ste. Anne de Detroit, established by French explorer Antoine de la Mothe Cadillac in 1701. A historical marker for the church is present at the site, while the church moved to its current location in southwest Detroit in 1886.

== Architecture ==
One Griswold Street is a nine-story-tall (Note: Sources differ between 9 stories and 8.5 stories. This discrepancy may be due to whether or not the mezzanine above the first floor is counted as its own floor or not.) high-rise with a limestone facade that was built in the neoclassical style. The interior features a grand staircase on the first floor that leads up to a mezzanine second floor, in addition to stained glass windows and a tiled roof. The exterior corner facing the intersection has a large street clock attached to the building. Some of the design elements for the building were designed by Detroit-based sculptor Corrado Parducci, while, according to Emporis, the architect responsible for the building was George D. Mason. The building has a total floor area of roughly 50,000 square feet (4,600 m^{2}). A large sign bearing the name of the building's tenant is displayed on top of the building.

== History ==
The building was constructed in either 1927 or 1930 to serve as the headquarters for the Standard Savings bank. As such, it was also known as the Standard Savings Building. The building later served as offices for Raymond James Financial, leading to it also being known as the Raymond James Building. However, by 2007, the building was vacant.

=== Ownership by the Church of Scientology ===
In October 2007, the building was purchased by the Church of Scientology for $3.5 million. The organization has had a presence in the Detroit area since 1963 and originally operated a facility along James Couzens Highway, though at the time of the purchase, the organization's main site in the area was in nearby Farmington Hills, Michigan. The organization announced that One Griswold would serve as their new regional headquarters, with the staff of the Farmington Hills location to make up the core staff of the new downtown location. Following the purchase, the organization listed their Farmington Hills property for sale for $1.5 million.

By 2015, the building was still vacant and unused. However, on May 13 of that year, the Historic District Commission (HDC) held a hearing that included a proposal by the Church of Scientology to renovate the building. At the meeting, Gensler, a global architecture firm that works with the Church of Scientology in the United States, made several proposals, including replacing a large sign on the top of the building that read "Raymond James" with one reading "Scientology", installing another "Scientology" sign above the building's street clock, adding a large ornamental cross over the front door, and adding both HVAC equipment and a deck to the building's rooftop. Additionally, Gensler stated that interior renovations would include returning the first and second floors to their original appearance by restoring a grand staircase and a mezzanine that had been removed at some point in the building's history. However, the HDC tabled the proposals for a meeting later that year, with Curbed Detroit reporting that the commission was unhappy with the proposed changes to the rooftop and how they would affect the appearance of the historic building.

On July 17, 2017, the Detroit City Council approved a permit for the Church of Scientology to begin a planned $8 million renovation of the building. The general contractor for the renovation was Roncelli, Inc., a firm based in Sterling Heights, Michigan. By September 2018, renovations were well underway, with the "Scientology" sign erected on top of the building. While it is uncommon for buildings in the Detroit Financial District to have rooftop signs, as the Scientology building does, the organization was successful in getting permission for the sign based in part on the precedent set by the former tenants, Raymond James Financial.

On October 7, 2018, the building was dedicated in a private ceremony led by the Church of Scientology's leader, David Miscavige, and attended by about 2,000 spectators. As part of the ceremony, a portion of Griswold Street near the building was closed to traffic. The building opened to the public the following day, with the organization hosting guided tours. According to Church of Scientology representative Karin Pouw, the organization would be the sole tenant of the building but would host activities from nonprofit and community organizations free of charge.
