= Castle Kyalami =

South Africa building owned by Scientology

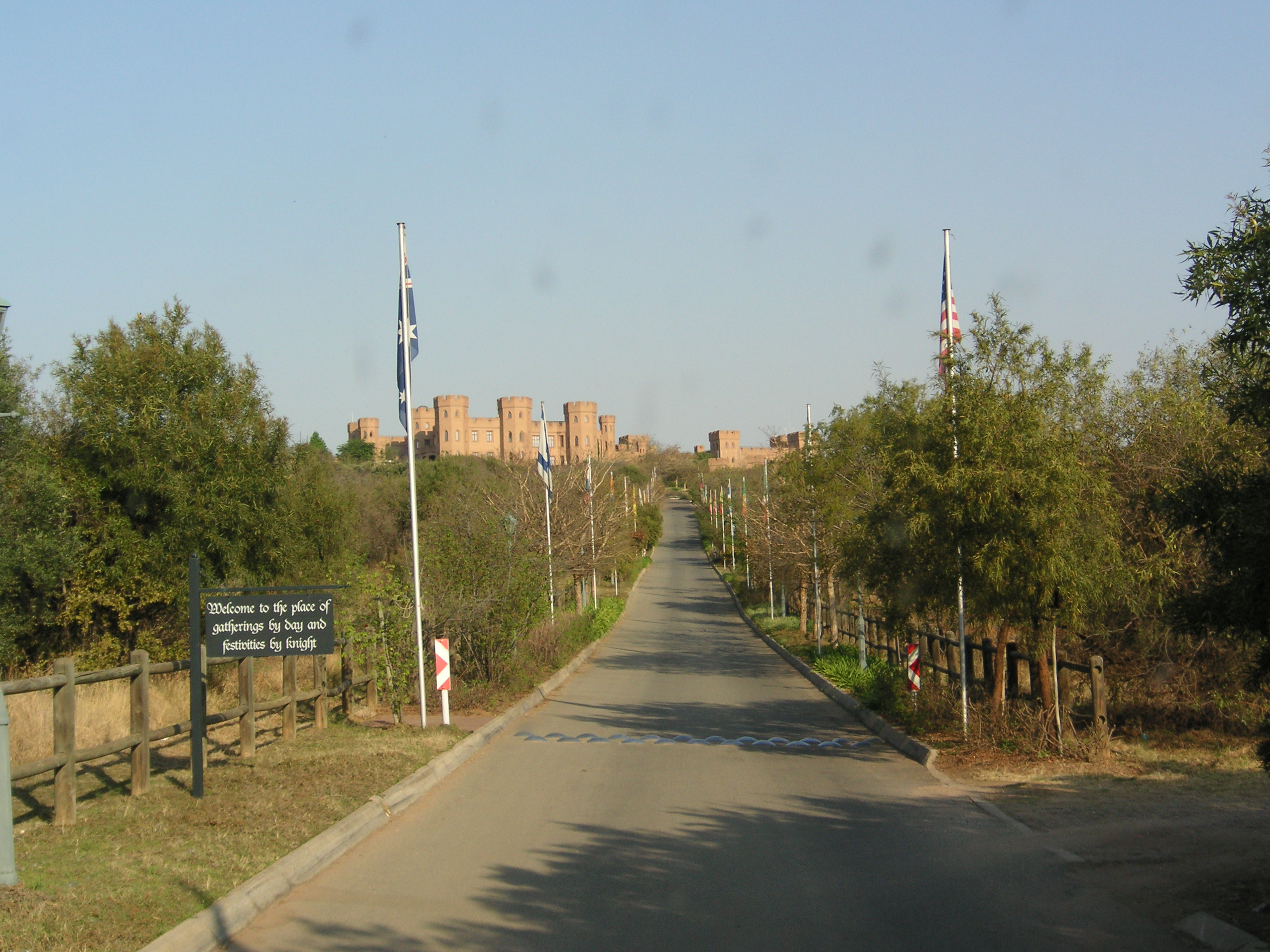
- The castle viewed from the entrance
- Interactive map of the Castle Kyalami area

General information
- Type: mock castle
- Location: Kyalami, Johannesburg, South Africa
- Coordinates: 25°59′53″S 28°3′34″E
- Owner: Church of Scientology

Technical details
- Floor area: 64,000 sq ft (5,900 m^{2})

Design and construction
- Architect: Demos Dinopoulos

Castle Kyalami (also referred to as Kyalami Castle) is a mock castle located in Kyalami in the province of Gauteng, north of Johannesburg, South Africa. Formerly a tourist attraction and hotel, the castle was purchased by the Church of Scientology in March 2008.

== Background ==
Castle Kyalami was built in 1992 by Greek millionaire and architect Demos Dinopoulos. Located in the northern Johannesburg suburb of Kyalami, the castle is set on a 22 acres (8.9 ha) estate. The 64,000-square-foot (5,900 m^{2}) castle has an Arthurian style, and contains a spa, 24 suites, a luxury hotel, a restaurant, a conference centre and its own helipad.

Dinopoulos lived in this expansive building for only nine years before putting it on auction. It was bought by Planet Hotels and opened as a 4-star hotel in 2001. Dinopoulos originally planned the castle to provide for his extended family, so that when his two daughters and son got married, they would live with their families in the castle. The original castle consisted of the main house, three self-contained apartments, garages, yacht workshop and horse stables, stretching over several acres. The main house has now been converted into 11 en-suite rooms, and the self-contained apartments now consist of 13 en-suite rooms.

Room 11 was originally built for Dinopoulos' son, with a private entrance and a spiral staircase to the kitchen, because, in his father's words, "boys get hungry at night". The hotel's restaurant, The Bastion, was originally a sunken lounge with a full-size billiards table. The lounge was levelled and the room now accommodates 120 guests. What was originally the entertainment room of the Dinopoulos family has been converted into the wine cellar of the hotel. It now accommodates 20 people as an intimate dinner venue, with its own private entrance. The original sauna and jacuzzi in a turret have remained, alongside a swimming pool and clay tennis court. The 22-horse stables have been converted into a 500-person conference centre, with a state-of-the-art kitchen attached. The original garage and yacht workshop have been converted into The Bailey conference facility. Dinopoulos actually completed his yacht in the workshop, and sailed to the south of Spain, where he remains still, because his children grew up and left home.

In the guidebook Lonely Planet: South Africa, Lesotho and Swaziland, Fitzpatrick et al. describe the "mock castle" as "one of Jo'burg's true oddities". When the castle was still a tourist attraction, Abigail Wills of the publication Conference & Incentive Travel recommended it for those visiting the area: "Former private residences such as Ballito Manor, 50 km from Durban, The Castle in Kyalami and the Saxon in Johannesburg are ideal for exclusive use."

The castle was the site of the "Ika East Meets Africa" fashion show on 13 August 2003, and has been used in the past for business conferences. Prior to being purchased by the Church of Scientology the castle functioned as a hotel, and as of July 2006 the castle was the flagship for Planet Hotels.

== Purchased by Church of Scientology ==
In March 2008, the castle was purchased by the Church of Scientology for an undisclosed amount. Paul Sondergaard, National Director of the Church of Scientology's Public Affairs Office, stated that the grounds will serve as a Scientology retreat: "We were looking for a building big enough for these purposes, that had some character and was out of the city rush". In a Scientology press release, Sondergaard also said that Scientologists would conduct advanced spiritual training at the castle: "For all African Scientologists, this is a dream finally come true ... It means a lot to the future expansion of the Church in Africa."

The purchase was part of an expansion into South Africa by the Church of Scientology, which purchased buildings in Cape Town, Port Elizabeth, Durban and Pretoria around the same time. The Castle Kyalami is the Church of Scientology's 66th global acquisition to their international property holdings. According to Scopical, "It is believed that the new property will be used as a central base for the organisation's expansion in Africa."

The Scientology Headquarters for Africa in Castle Kyalami celebrated its grand opening on 1 January 2019. Church leader David Miscavige said to the crowd gathered at the site: "Today you are witnessing history: This first new Advanced Organisation in our Golden Age, this nation where new millennium Churches of Scientology first arose."

== See also ==
- List of castles in Africa
- List of Castles and Fortifications in South Africa
- Church of Scientology International
