= Kyalami 9 Hours =

Endurance Race

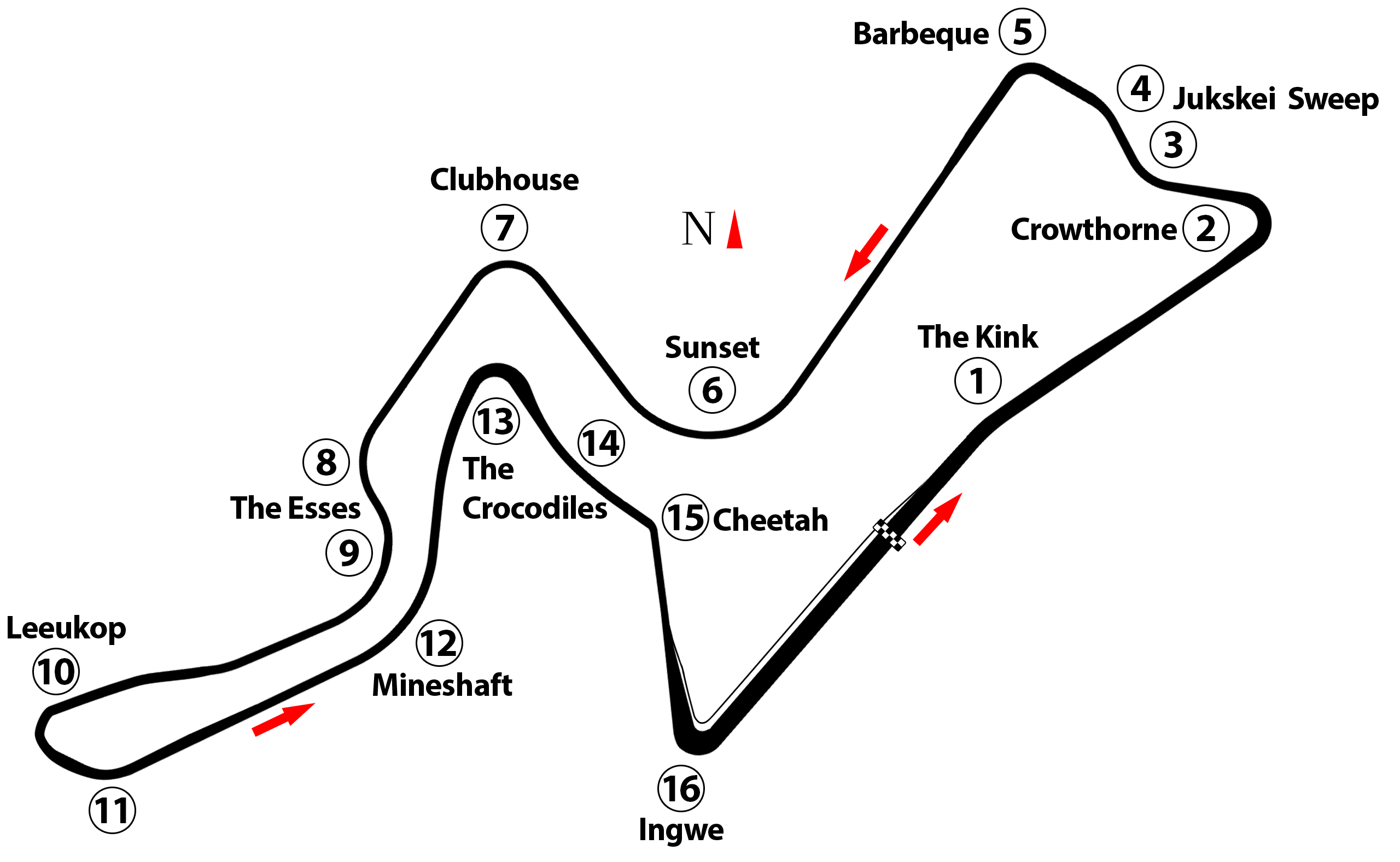

Intercontinental GT Challenge
- Venue: Kyalami
- First race: 1958
- First IGTC race: 2019
- Duration: 9 Hours
- Previous names: South African Nine Hour Endurance Race; Kyalami 6 Hours; 1000km Kyalami; Southern Sun 500

The Nine Hours of Kyalami is an endurance sports car race contested at Kyalami, Midrand, South Africa. The first races were held from 1958 to 1960 at a circuit at the Grand Central Airport near Midrand before moving to Kyalami in 1961. The event was a mainstay until the late 1980s; however, it was only held three times between 1989 and 2018. The 1974 event was a round of the World Championship of Makes and the 1983 and 1984 races were rounds of the World Endurance Championship. The event was revived in 2019 as part of the 2019 Intercontinental GT Challenge.

== History ==
From 1965 to 1973, the race was the centerpiece of the South African Springbok Trophy Series. In 1974, the event was part of the World Championship of Makes, switching to a 6 hour/1000 kilometre format. From 1975 until 1979, the race was held for touring cars. The race returned to sports cars and its 9-hour duration in 1981 and 1982, before being shortened to 1000 km and becoming part of the World Endurance Championship in 1983 and 1984. After not being held in 1985 due to circuit construction, a 500 km event was contested from 1986 to 1988. After a ten-year hiatus, it was revived as a 2-hour, 30 minute, race as part of the SportsRacing World Cup from 1998 to 2000.

On 27 July 2018, circuit officials announced the nine-hour distance event would return to the calendar starting in 2019 as part of a revamped Intercontinental GT Challenge series from the Stéphane Ratel Organisation. The event will be the final event of a global series of GT3-focused events alongside the Bathurst 12 Hour, California 8 Hours, Spa 24 Hours and Suzuka 10 Hours. The race was originally scheduled for 3 November, but moved to 23 November to avoid a date clash with the 2019 Rugby World Cup.

== Grand Central ==
Year	Drivers	Entrant	Car	Distance/Duration	Race title
Non-Championship
15 November 1958	(South Africa) Ian Frazer-Jones (South Africa) Tony Fergusson		Porsche 356	9 hours 902.468 km (560.768 mi)	South African Nine Hour Endurance Race
6 October 1959	(South Africa) Chris Fergusson (South Africa) Hugh Carrington	(South Africa) H. M. Carrington	Dart – Climax	9 hours 922.959 km (573.500 mi)	South African Nine Hour Endurance Race
29 October 1960	(Rhodesia) Dawie Gous (Rhodesia) John Love	(South Africa) A. H. Pillman & Son (Pty.) Ltd.	Porsche 550 RS	9 hours 989.816 km (615.043 mi)	Rand Daily Mail South African Nine Hour Endurance Race

== Kyalami ==
Year	Winning driver(s)	Entrant	Car	Distance/Duration	Race title
Non-Championship
4 November 1961	(Rhodesia) Dawie Gous (Rhodesia) John Love	(South Africa) A. H. Pillman & Son (pty.) Ltd.	Porsche 550 Spyder	9 hours 1,082.509 km (672.640 mi)	South African Nine Hour Endurance Race
3 November 1962	(United Kingdom) David Piper (South Africa) Bruce Johnstone	(United Kingdom) David Piper	Ferrari 250 GTO	9 hours 1,113.022 km (691.600 mi)	Rand Daily Mail Nine Hour Endurance Race
2 November 1963	(United Kingdom) David Piper (South Africa) Tony Maggs	(United Kingdom) David Piper	Ferrari 250 GTO	9 hours 1,198.000 km (744.403 mi)	Rand Daily Mail Nine Hour Endurance Race
21 October 1964	(United Kingdom) David Piper (South Africa) Tony Maggs	(United Kingdom) David Piper Auto Racing Ltd. (United Kingdom) Maranello Concessionaires	Ferrari 250 LM	9 hours 1,222.240 km (759.465 mi)	Rand Daily Mail Nine Hour Endurance Race
South African Springbok Trophy Series
6 November 1965	(United Kingdom) David Piper (United Kingdom) Richard Attwood	(United Kingdom) David Piper Auto Racing Ltd.	Ferrari 365 P2	9 hours 1,240.729 km (770.953 mi)	Rand Daily Mail Nine Hour Endurance Race
5 November 1966	(United Kingdom) David Piper (United Kingdom) Richard Attwood	(United Kingdom) David Piper Auto Racing Ltd.	Ferrari 365 P2/3	9 hours 1,191.590 km (740.420 mi)	Rand Daily Mail Nine Hour Endurance Race
4 November 1967	(Belgium) Jacky Ickx (United Kingdom) Brian Redman	(United Kingdom) J.W. Automotive	Mirage M1-Ford	9 hours 1,403.509 km (872.100 mi)	Rand Daily Mail Nine Hour Endurance Race
9 November 1968	(Belgium) Jacky Ickx (United Kingdom) David Hobbs	(United Kingdom) J.W. Automotive	Mirage M1-Ford	9 hours 1,288.602 km (800.700 mi)	Rand Daily Mail 9 hours
8 November 1969	(United Kingdom) David Piper (United Kingdom) Richard Attwood	(United Kingdom) David Piper Auto Racing Ltd.	Porsche 917	9 hours 1,337.848 km (831.300 mi)	Rand Daily Mail 9 hours
7 November 1970	(Belgium) Jacky Ickx (Italy) Ignazio Giunti	(Italy) SpA Ferrari SEFAC	Ferrari 512 M	9 hours 1,518.400 km (943.490 mi)	Rand Daily Mail 9 hours
6 November 1971	(Switzerland) Clay Regazzoni (United Kingdom) Brian Redman	(Italy) SpA Ferrari SEFAC	Ferrari 312PB	9 hours 1,455.000 km (904.095 mi)	Rand Daily Mail 9 hours
4 November 1972	(Switzerland) Clay Regazzoni (Italy) Arturo Merzario	(Italy) SpA Ferrari SEFAC	Ferrari 312PB	9 hours 1,497.196 km (930.314 mi)	Kyalami 9 Hours
3 November 1973	(West Germany) Reinhold Joest (Switzerland) Herbert Müller	(West Germany) Joest Racing	Porsche 908/3	9 hours 1,475.490 km (916.827 mi)	Kyalami 9 Hours
World Championship of Makes
9 November 1974	(France) Gérard Larrousse (France) Henri Pescarolo	(France) Equipe Gitanes	Matra-Simca MS670C	6 hours 964.440 km (599.275 mi)	Kyalami 6 Hours
Non-Championship
1 November 1975	(West Germany) Hans Heyer (West Germany) Peter Hennige (West Germany) Jochen Mass	(West Germany) Ford Köln	Ford Escort II RS	1,000 km (620 mi)	Wynn's 1000 km Kyalami
6 November 1976	(South Africa) Jody Scheckter (Sweden) Gunnar Nilsson	(West Germany) BMW Motorsport/Faltz-Alpina	BMW 3.0 CSL	1,000 km (620 mi)	
6 November 1977	(West Germany) Hans Heyer (South Africa) Jody Scheckter	(West Germany) Zakspeed	Ford Escort RS Mk II Gr.5	1,000 km (620 mi)	Wynn's 1000 km Kyalami
4 November 1978	(South Africa) Brian Cook (South Africa) Phil Adams		Datsun 140Z	1,000 km (620 mi)	Wynn's 1000 km Kyalami
30 November 1979	(West Germany) Helmut Kelleners (South Africa) Eddie Keizan	(Switzerland) Eggenberger Racing	BMW M1	1,000 km (620 mi)	Wynn's 1000 km Kyalami
1980	Not held				
7 November 1981	(West Germany) Jochen Mass (West Germany) Reinhold Joest	(West Germany) Joest Racing	Porsche 936	9 hours 365 laps	
6 November 1982	(Belgium) Jacky Ickx (West Germany) Jochen Mass	(West Germany) Rothmans Porsche	Porsche 956	9 hours 963.939 km (598.964 mi)	
World Endurance Championship
10 December 1983	(West Germany) Stefan Bellof (United Kingdom) Derek Bell	(West Germany) Rothmans Porsche	Porsche 956	1,000 km (620 mi)	Castrol 1000 km Kyalami
3 November 1984	(Italy) Riccardo Patrese (Italy) Alessandro Nannini	(Italy) Martini Racing	Lancia LC2-84	1,000 km (620 mi)	Kyalami 1000 km
1985	Not held				
Non-Championship
23 November 1986	(Italy) Piercarlo Ghinzani	(West Germany) Joest Racing	Porsche 956B	500 km (310 mi)	Southern Sun 500
28 November 1987	(West Germany) Jochen Mass	(United Kingdom) Richard Lloyd Racing	Porsche 962C	500 km (310 mi)	
26 November 1988	(France) Bob Wollek	(West Germany) Joest Racing	Porsche 962C	500 km (310 mi)	
1989–1997	Not held				
ISRS / SportsRacing World Cup
6 December 1998	(France) Jérôme Policand (South Africa) Gary Formato	(France) Solution F	Riley & Scott Mk III-Ford	2 hours, 30 minutes 383.13 km (238.07 mi)	Vodacom ISRS
28 November 1999	(France) Jean-Marc Gounon (France) Éric Bernard	(France) DAMS	Lola B98/10-Judd	1 hour, 30 minutes 196.28 km (121.96 mi)	Vodacom Festival of Motor Racing
26 November 2000	(South Africa) Gary Formato (Germany) Ralf Kelleners	(Germany) Kremer Racing	Kremer Lola B98/K2000-Ford	2 hours, 30 minutes 375.14 km (233.10 mi)	Vodacom Festival of Motor Racing
2001–2018	Not held				
Intercontinental GT Challenge
23 November 2019	(France) Mathieu Jaminet (Norway) Dennis Olsen (United Kingdom) Nick Tandy	(Germany) Frikadelli Racing Team	Porsche 911 GT3 R	9:00:06; 1,171.198 km (727.749 mi)	Kyalami 9 Hour
12 December 2020	(Brazil) Augusto Farfus (Netherlands) Nicky Catsburg (South Africa) Sheldon van der Linde	(Germany) Walkenhorst Motorsport	BMW M6 GT3	9:00:30; 1,254.533 km (779.531 mi)	Joburg Kyalami 9 Hour
2021	Not held				
6 February 2022	(Russia) Timur Boguslavskiy (France) Jules Gounon (Italy) Raffaele Marciello	(France) AKKA ASP Team	Mercedes-AMG GT3 Evo	9:01:17; 1,390.403 km (863.956 mi)	Joburg Kyalami 9 Hour
25 February 2023	(South Africa) Sheldon van der Linde (Belgium) Dries Vanthoor (Belgium) Charles Weerts	(Belgium) Team WRT	BMW M4 GT3	9:00.56; 1,383.730 km (859.810 mi)	Joburg Kyalami 9 Hour
South African Endurance Series
16 December 2023	(United Kingdom) Nick Adcock (South Africa) Leyton Fourie (Denmark) Michael Jensen (South Africa) Jonathan Thomas	(South Africa) Adjust4Sleep / Rico Barlow Racing	Nova Proto NP02	9:01:22; 1,195.656 km (742.946 mi)	SAES Nine Hours of Kyalami
30 November 2024	(South Africa) Xolile Letlaka (South Africa) Mikaeel Pitamber (South Africa) Stuart White	(South Africa) Into Africa Racing	Lamborghini Huracán GT3 Evo 2	09:01:08; 1,254.533 km (779.531 mi)	SAES Nine Hours of Kyalami
29 November 2025	(Zimbabwe) Axcil Jefferies (South Africa) Xolile Letlaka (South Africa) Stuart White	(South Africa) Into Africa Racing	Lamborghini Huracán GT3 Evo 2	09:00:06; 1,295.294 km (804.858 mi)	SAES Nine Hours of Kyalami

== Multiple winners ==
=== By driver ===
Wins	Driver	Years
6	(United Kingdom) David Piper	1962–1966, 1969
4	(Belgium) Jacky Ickx	1967, 1968, 1970, 1982
4	(West Germany) Jochen Mass	1975, 1981, 1982, 1987
3	(United Kingdom) Richard Attwood	1965, 1966, 1969
2	(Rhodesia) Dawie Gous	1960, 1961
2	(Rhodesia) John Love	1960, 1961
2	(South Africa) Tony Maggs	1963, 1964
2	(United Kingdom) Brian Redman	1967, 1971
2	(Switzerland) Clay Regazzoni	1971, 1972
2	(West Germany) Reinhold Joest	1973, 1981
2	(South Africa) Jody Scheckter	1976, 1977
2	(South Africa) Gary Formato	1998, 2000
2	(South Africa) Sheldon van der Linde	2020, 2023

=== By manufacturer ===
Wins	Manufacturer	Years
12	(Germany) Porsche	1958, 1960, 1961, 1969, 1973, 1981–1983, 1986–1988, 2019
8	(Italy) Ferrari	1962–1966, 1970–1972
4	(Germany) BMW	1976, 1979, 2020, 2023
2	(United Kingdom) Mirage	1967, 1968
2	(United States) Ford	1975, 1977
2	(United Kingdom) Lola	1999, 2000
