= Kyalami =

Race track in Midrand, Gauteng, South Africa

Kyalami Grand Prix Circuit
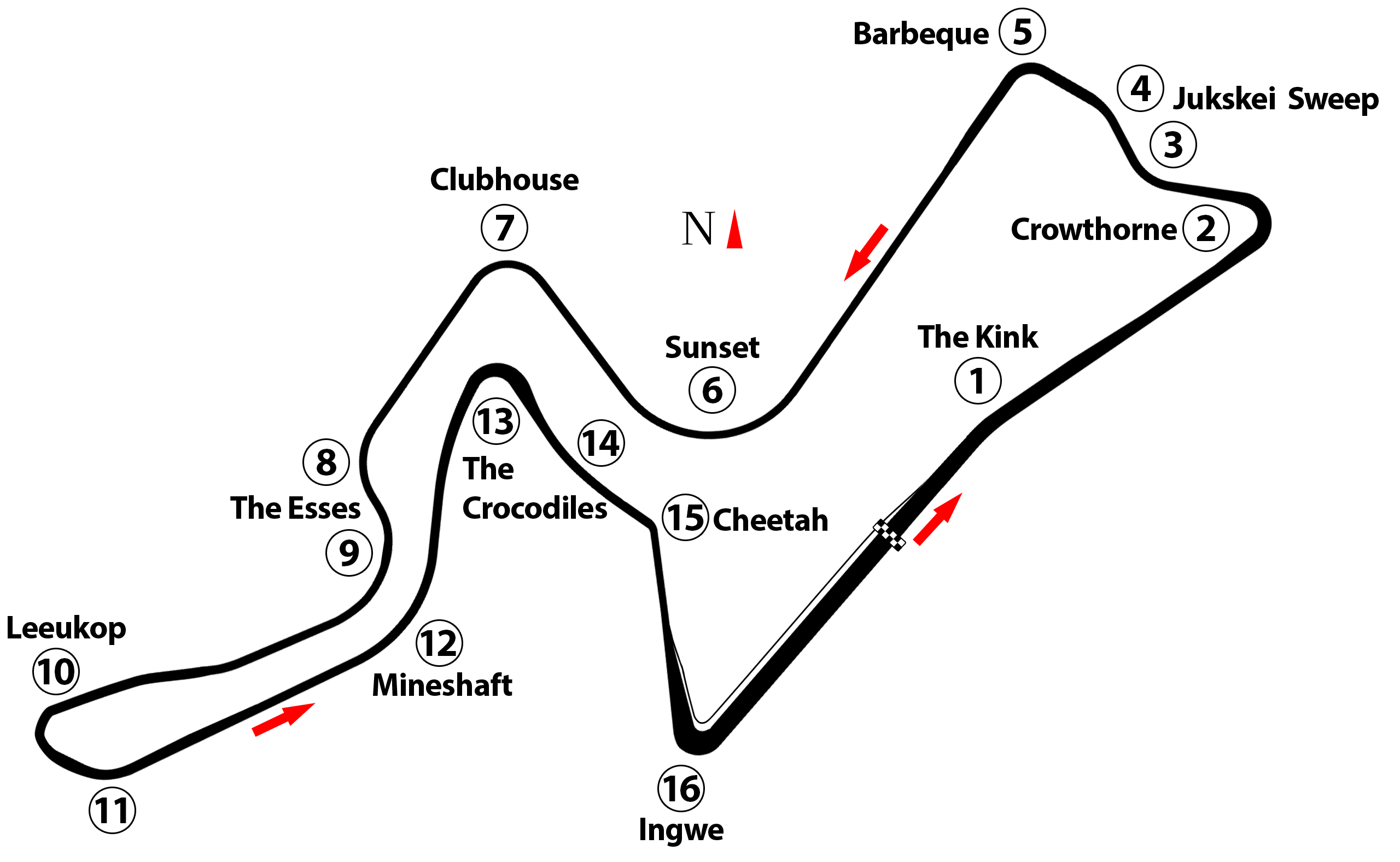
- Grand Prix Circuit (2015–present)
- Location: Midrand, Gauteng, South Africa
- Coordinates: 25°59′53″S 28°4′08″E
- Capacity: 100,000
- FIA Grade: 2 (Note: Kyalami's Grade 2 licence expired on 18 August 2025.)
- Owner: Toby Venter (July 2014–present)
- Broke ground: 1961
- Opened: 4 November 1961; 65 years ago
- Major events: Future: Kyalami 24 Hours (2027); Former: Intercontinental GT Challenge (2019–2020, 2022–2023); Kyalami 9 Hours (1958–1979, 1981–1984, 1986–1988, 1998–2000, 2019–2020, 2022–2025); Formula One; South African Grand Prix (1967–1985, 1992–1993); Grand Prix motorcycle racing South African motorcycle Grand Prix (1983–1985, 1992); World SBK (1998–2002, 2009–2010); A1 Grand Prix (2009); World Sportscar Championship (1974, 1983–1984); Rand Grand Prix (1961–1965)
- Website: kyalamigrandprixcircuit.com

Grand Prix Circuit (2015–present)
- Surface: Asphalt
- Length: 4.529 km (2.814 mi)
- Turns: 16
- Race lap record: 1:40.120 ( (South Africa) Charl Michael Visser, Nova Proto NP02, 2025, Sports prototype)

Grand Prix Circuit (1992–1993 and 2009–2015)
- Surface: Asphalt
- Length: 4.261 km (2.648 mi)
- Turns: 13
- Race lap record: 1:17.578 ( (United Kingdom) Nigel Mansell, Williams FW14B, 1992, F1)

Grand Prix Circuit (1994–2009)
- Surface: Asphalt
- Length: 4.2606 km (2.6474 mi)
- Turns: 13
- Race lap record: 1:28.306 ( (Malaysia) Fairuz Fauzy, A1GP Ferrari, 2009, A1GP)

Grand Prix Circuit (1989–1991)
- Surface: Asphalt
- Length: 3.888 km (2.416 mi)
- Turns: 11
- Race lap record: 1:30.660 ( (Germany) Roland Asch, Mercedes 190E 2.5-16 Evo2, 1990, Group A)

Grand Prix Circuit (1968–1988)
- Surface: Asphalt
- Length: 4.104 km (2.550 mi)
- Turns: 9
- Race lap record: 1:08.149 ( (Finland) Keke Rosberg, Williams FW10, 1985, F1)

Original Grand Prix Circuit (1961–1967)
- Surface: Asphalt
- Length: 4.094 km (2.544 mi)
- Turns: 9
- Race lap record: 1:27.600 ( (South Africa) Dave Charlton, Brabham BT11, 1967, F1)

Kyalami Grand Prix Circuit (from Khaya lami, My home in Zulu) is a 4.529 km (2.814 mi) motor racing circuit located in Midrand, Gauteng, South Africa, just north of Johannesburg. The name Kyalami also commonly refers to the suburb where the race track is located. The circuit has been used for Grand Prix and Formula One races and has hosted the South African Grand Prix twenty times. Among the Formula One races held at the track the 1977 South African Grand Prix stands out, as it is principally remembered for the fatal accident that claimed the lives of race marshal Frederick Jansen van Vuuren and driver Tom Pryce. In recent years, the area surrounding the circuit has developed into a residential and commercial suburb of Johannesburg. More recently, Kyalami has played host to five rounds of the Superbike World Championship from 1998 to 2002 and later in 2009 and 2010, the season finale of the Superstars Series in 2009 and 2010, and the South African round of the 2008–09 A1 Grand Prix season. International racing returned to the circuit in November 2019, when it hosted the 2019 Kyalami 9 Hours, serving as the season finale of the 2019 Intercontinental GT Challenge.

== History ==
The original, sweeping circuit was designed and cleared by Harry Pierce and Dick Bremner along with a few friends and workers in the mid-1950s. The two were also responsible for the hosting and housing of early race teams that ventured to Africa to try out the new track with Bremner being the chairman of the South African Automotive Racing Association. The circuit was opened on 4 November 1961 with the race of Kyalami 9 Hours. Its first major international event was in 1961 until political sanctions (due to apartheid policies) eliminated the Grand Prix after the 1985 race. The final race at the original circuit was held on 26 November 1988.

=== Original layout: 1961–1988 ===
Original layout of Kyalami

The clockwise track layout was based on a long straight with nine corners that had their naming inspired by a mix of local geography, South African cultural elements, and racing terminology. A lap started in close to the pit lane entrance on the Main Straight - a straight that lead downhill into the first bend.

1. Crowthorne Corner – A tight right-hander, being the first turn after the start-finish straight. The corner was named after the Crowthorne Hotel, located near this particular section of the circuit.
2. Barbecue Bend A second right-hand medium speed bend likely named after the tradition of South African barbecues (braais), which were often held near this section of the track during race events.
3. Jukskei Sweep This was a long, fast left-hand curve, named for the Jukskei River, which runs near the track. The river itself is named after the traditional Afrikaner game of Jukskei (similar to horse-shoes), which was played by early settlers.
4. Sunset Bend A fast right-hander considered one of the iconic corners on the track. It was so named because the corner often forced drives to face the setting sun while navigating this section of the track.
5. Clubhouse Bend A 90-degree left-hander named after the motorsport clubhouse that was located at this bend on the track.
6. Esses 1 Bend one: initial left-hander.
7. Esses 2. Right-handed 90-degree bend, leading to steep uphill into turn 8.
8. Leeukop Bend Leeukop was a tight right-hand hairpin that led onto the initial part of the long straight. This corner was named after Leeukop hill (Lion's Head), a common and prominent geographical naming feature in South African topography. It also referred to the Leeukop Prison that was located behind the hill on adjacent land.
9. The Kink This was a right deviation in the track splitting the main straight into two sections.

=== Revised layout: 1989 to present ===
When the circuit was rebuilt in 1989 as part of a commercial development, Leeukop Bend, the Kink, Pit lane, the start/finish straight, Crowthorne Corner and Barbecue Bend were all eliminated. Jukskei Sweep was heavily modified to create the entrance into the bend before the then newly built Pit lane and start/finish straight. The remaining part of the old fast circuit, modified to a lesser degree were Sunset Bend, Clubhouse Bend and the Esses still incorporated into the current configuration, with the result that the circuit became a narrow, twisty ribbon rather than one of the fastest circuits on the calendar. Formula One abandoned the rebuilt circuit in 1993 after just two races on the new layout, caused by a bankruptcy on the part of the promoter.

It hosted the South African motorcycle Grand Prix until 1992.

Kyalami was changed again with the building of the current pit lane and start/finish straight and later again changes were made, with the addition of a chicane which in turn was removed again for the 2009 World Superbike race. Kyalami came under new management and 2008 saw the 50th anniversary of the 9-hour revival being held at Kyalami with golden oldies like David Piper and others. On 6 June 2014, it was announced that Kyalami would be auctioned off on 24 July without reserve. On 24 July 2014, it was auctioned off for R205 million. The winning bidder was Toby Venter, owner of Porsche South Africa. R100 million was invested to upgrade the circuit, allowing it to successfully obtain an FIA Grade 2 status.

On 12 December 2019, the provisional calendar for the 2020–21 FIA World Endurance Championship was announced, containing a six-hour race at Kyalami scheduled for 6 February 2021. However, after the calendar was revised due to the COVID-19 pandemic, Kyalami was removed.

== Layout history ==
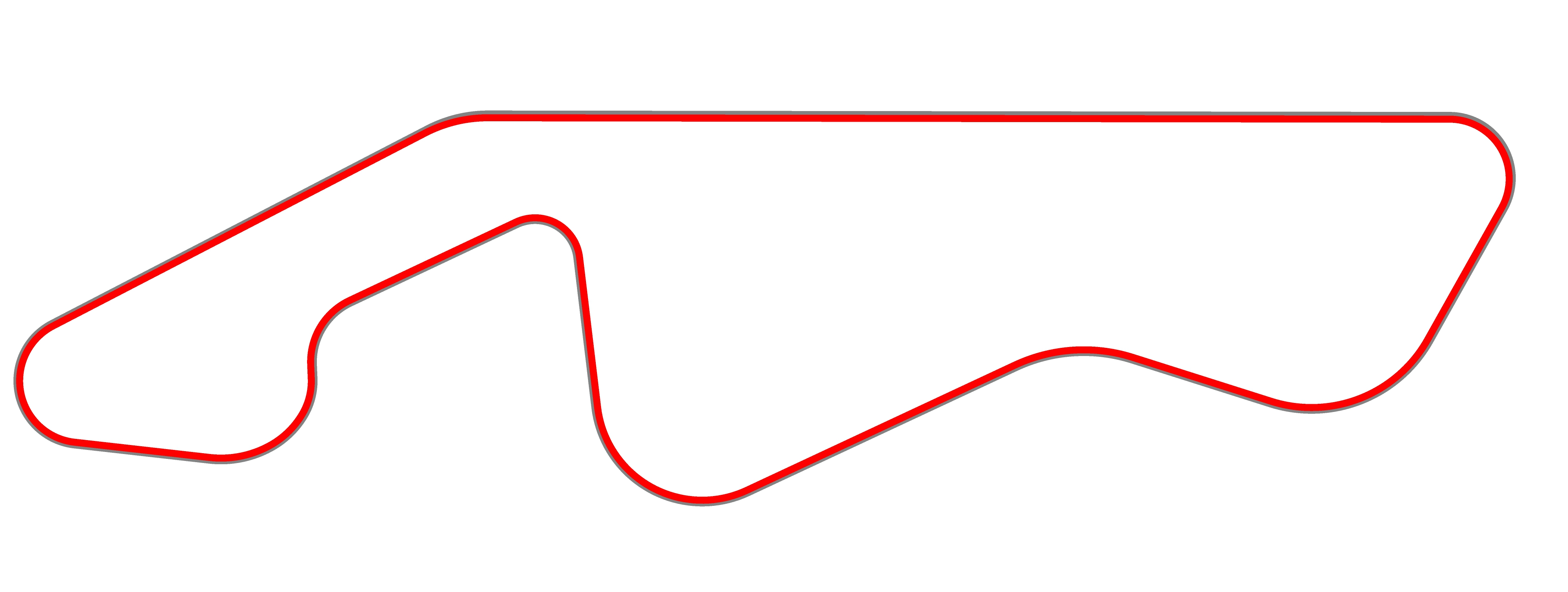
The original grand prix circuit layout in red built in 1961, 26 feet wide and measuring 4.094 km (2.544 mi)

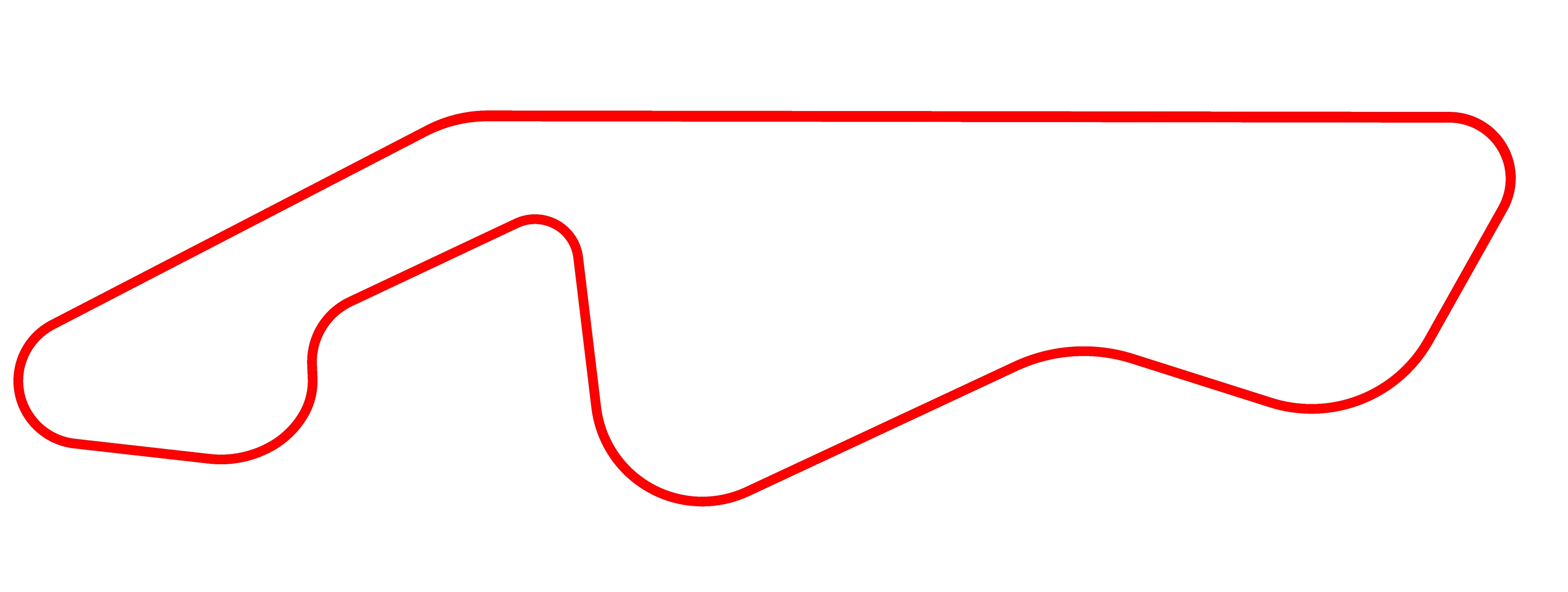
The widened layout in red built in 1968, 36 feet wide and 40 feet from the Kink to Crowthorne and measuring 4.104 km (2.550 mi)

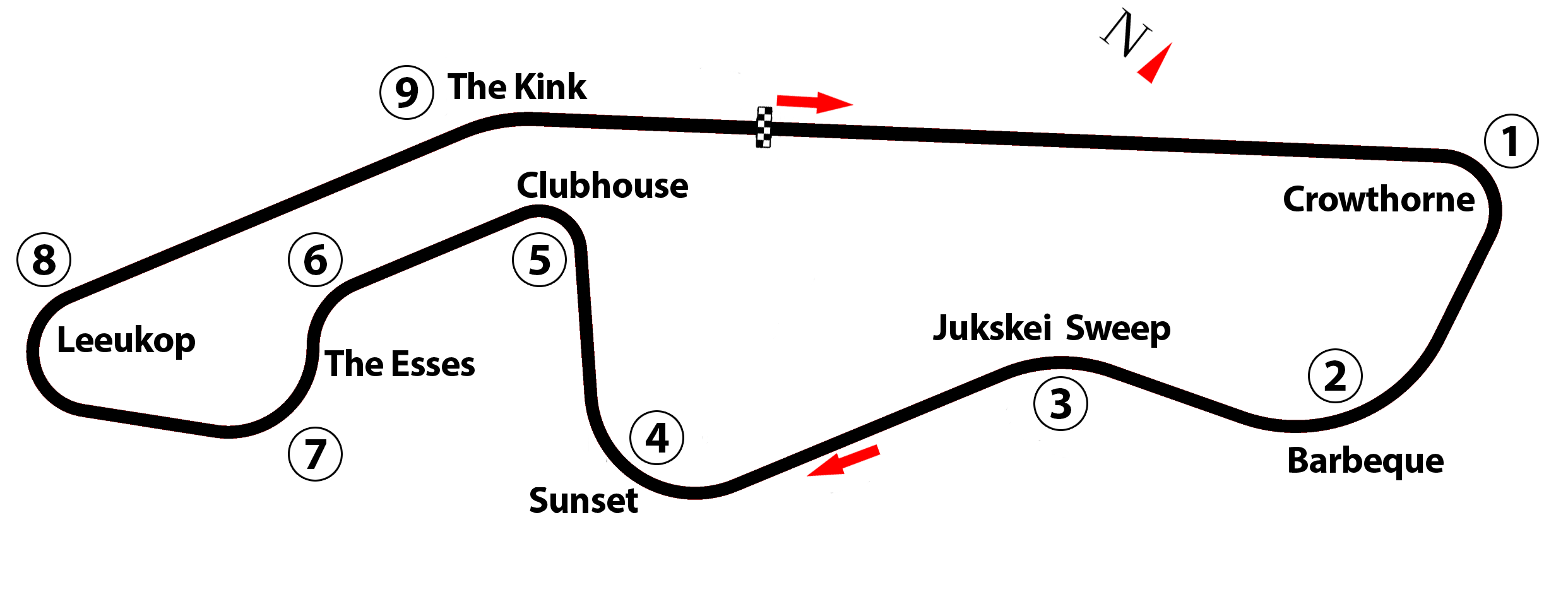
Kyalami Grand Prix Circuit (1968–1988)

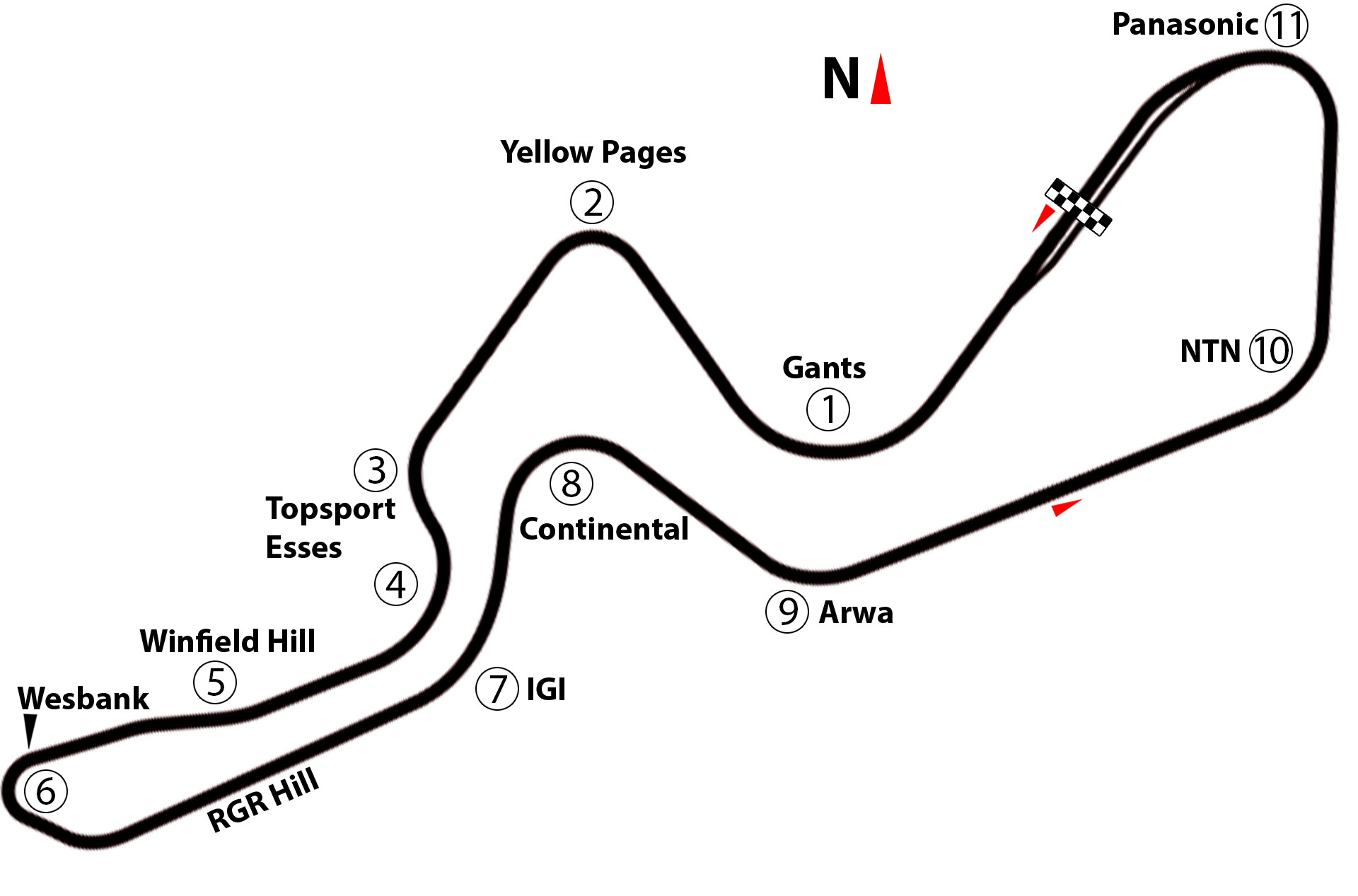
Kyalami Grand Prix Circuit (1989–1991)

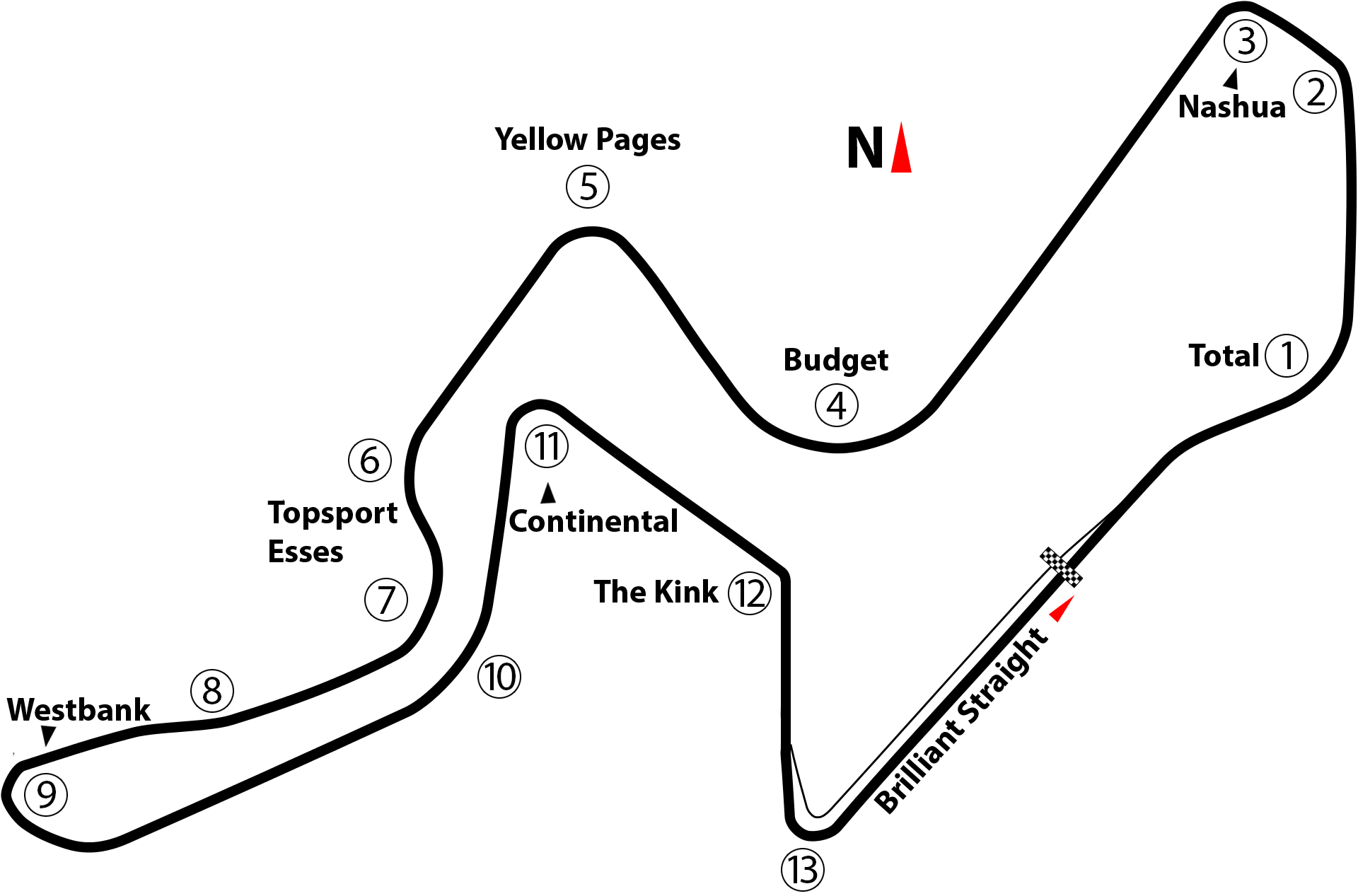
Kyalami Grand Prix Circuit (1992–1993, 2009–2015)

Kyalami Grand Prix Circuit (1994–2008)

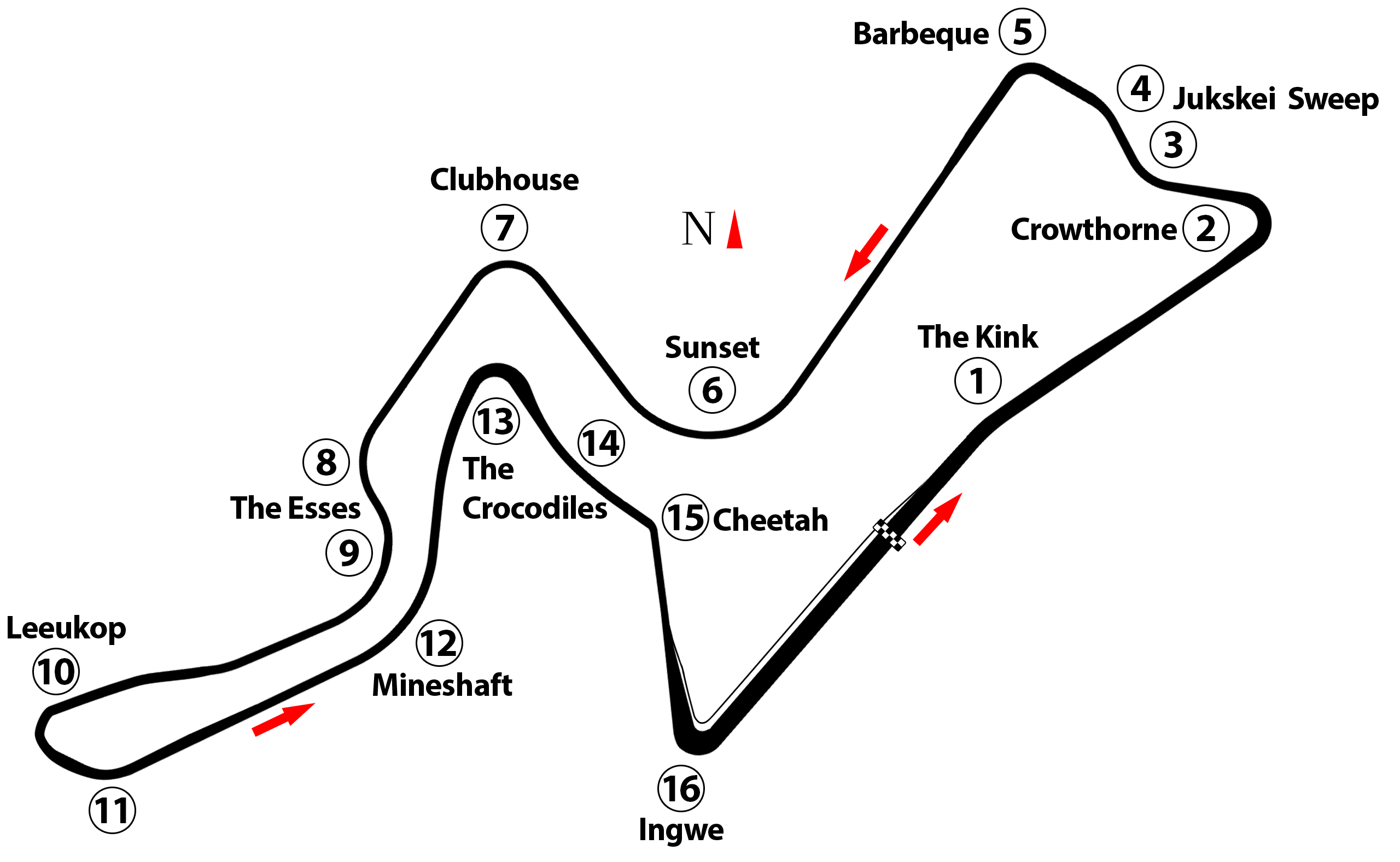
Kyalami Grand Prix Circuit (2015–present)

== South African Grand Prix ==
From 1967 to 1993, Kyalami hosted 21 editions of the South African Grand Prix. Perhaps the most infamous of these was the 1982 edition, when the Grand Prix Drivers' Association staged a strike in protest of new superlicence conditions imposed by FISA.

Niki Lauda became the most successful driver at Kyalami, taking his third victory at the circuit in 1984. Alain Prost, Nigel Mansell and Jackie Stewart are the joint second-most successful drivers at the circuit, with two wins each. Jody Scheckter became the first and only South African driver to win their home race during the 1975 edition. Ferrari and Williams are the most successful constructors at the circuit, with four wins each.

In June 2022 it was reported that Stefano Domenicali, the President of Formula One, had flown to South Africa to meet representatives of the circuit about a possible return for F1 in 2023, but the course was not included in the 2023 provisional calendar.

== Events ==
Current

- August: Festival of Motoring
- November: South African Endurance Series

Future

- Kyalami 24 Hours (2027)

Former

- A1 Grand Prix
  - 2008–09 A1 Grand Prix of Nations, South Africa (2009)
- Birkin Cars/TVR Invitational Race (1995)
- Formula One
  - South African Grand Prix (1967–1985, 1992–1993)
- Grand Prix Masters (2005)
- Grand Prix motorcycle racing
  - South African motorcycle Grand Prix (1983–1985, 1992)
- Intercontinental GT Challenge
  - Kyalami 9 Hours (2019–2020, 2022–2023)
- Rand Grand Prix (1961–1965)
- South African Formula Atlantic Championship (1976–1979)
- South African Formula One Championship (1961–1975)
- South African Springbok Championship Series
  - Kyalami 9 Hours (1965–1973)
- Sidecar World Championship (2000, 2002)
- Sports Racing World Cup
  - Vodacom Festival of Motor Racing (1998–2000)
- Superbike World Championship
  - Kyalami Superbike World Championship round (1998–2002, 2009–2010)
- Supersport World Championship (1998–1999, 2002, 2009–2010)
- Superstars Series (2009–2010)
- World Sportscar Championship
  - Kyalami 1000 km (1974, 1983–1984)

== Lap records ==
As of July 2025, the fastest official race lap records of the Kyalami Grand Prix Circuit are listed as:

Category	Time	Driver	Vehicle	Event
Grand Prix Circuit (6th Configuration) (2015–present): 4.529 km (2.814 mi)
Sports prototype	1:40.120	Charl Michael Visser	Nova Proto NP02	2025 SAES 4 Hours of Kyalami
GT3	1:41.425	Michael Stephen	Audi R8 LMS GT3	2023 Kyalami Festival of Motoring
Group CN	1:47.188	Mikaeel Pitamber	Ligier JS53	2023 Kyalami Wild Rose Gin Sports & GT round
Superbike	1:47.562	Clinton Seller	Kawasaki Ninja ZX-10R	2024 2nd Kyalami ZX10 Masters round
Touring car racing	1:48.495	Paulo Loureiro	BMW 335i	2023 Kyalami BMW M Performance Parts Race Series round
GTC	1:50.256	Michael Stephen	BMW 128TC	2024 Kyalami Global Touring Car Championship round
Porsche Carrera Cup	1:51.774	Nicky Dicks	Porsche 911 (991 II) GT3 Cup	2023 Kyalami Wild Rose Gin Sports & GT round
Formula Ford	1:51.927	KC Ensor-Smith	Mygale M13-SJ	2024 Kyalami Investchem F1600 round
GT4	1:52.127	Joseph Ellerine	Audi R8 LMS GT4	2023 Kyalami Extreme Supercars round
SupaCup	1:54.958	Jonathan Mogotsi	Volkswagen Polo VI	2023 Kyalami Global Touring Car Championship round
Super Touring	1:57.480	Andreas Meier	BMW E36 STC	2023 Kyalami BMW M Performance Parts Race Series round
Gazoo Cup	2:07.105	Alex Shahini	Toyota GR86	2024 Kyalami Gazoo Racing SA Cup round
Grand Prix Circuit (4th Configuration) (1992–1993 and 2009–2015): 4.261 km (2.648 mi)
Formula One	1:17.578	Nigel Mansell	Williams FW14B	1992 South African Grand Prix
World SBK	1:38.170	Michel Fabrizio	Ducati 1098R	2010 Kyalami World SBK round
500cc	1:39.952	Wayne Gardner	Honda NSR500	1992 South African motorcycle Grand Prix
World SSP	1:41.053	Eugene Laverty	Honda CBR600RR	2009 Kyalami World SSP round
250cc	1:42.094	Max Biaggi	Aprilia RSV 250	1992 South African motorcycle Grand Prix
125cc	1:48.687	Carlos Giró Jr	Aprilia RS125R	1992 South African motorcycle Grand Prix
Grand Prix Circuit (5th Configuration) (1994–2009): 4.2606 km (2.6474 mi)
A1GP	1:28.306	Fairuz Fauzy	A1GP Powered by Ferrari car	2009 Kyalami A1GP round
F3000	1:29.855	Kenny Bräck	Reynard 94D	1995 Birkin Cars/TVR Invitational Race
WSC	1:34.776	Mauro Baldi	Ferrari 333 SP	1998 2 h 30 min Kyalami
GP Masters	1:36.390	Nigel Mansell	Delta Motorsport GP Masters car	2005 Kyalami Grand Prix Masters
LMP900	1:36.756	Éric Bernard	Lola B98/10	1999 SportsRacing World Cup Kyalami
World SBK	1:42.178	Noriyuki Haga	Aprilia RSV 1000	2002 Kyalami World SBK round
LMP675	1:43.070	Mark Smithson	Pilbeam MP84	2000 Vodacom Speed Festival Kyalami
WesBank V8 Challenge	1:46.230	Sarel van der Merwe	Chevrolet Camaro	2000 Vodacom Speed Festival Kyalami
World SSP	1:46.975	James Whitham	Yamaha YZF-R6	2002 Kyalami World SSP round
Grand Prix Circuit (3rd Configuration) (1989–1991): 3.888 km (2.416 mi)
Group A	1:30.660	Roland Asch	Mercedes 190E 2.5-16 Evo2	1990 Yellow Pages 200
Grand Prix Circuit (2nd Configuration) (1968–1988): 4.104 km (2.550 mi)
Formula One	1:08.149	Keke Rosberg	Williams FW10	1985 South African Grand Prix
Group C1	1:11.170	Jochen Mass	Porsche 956	1986 Southern Sun 500
Group 5	1:19.300	Gérard Larrousse	Matra-Simca MS670C	1974 Kyalami 6 Hours
Group 6	1:20.100	Mario Andretti	Ferrari 312 PB	1971 Kyalami 9 Hours
Group C2	1:20.680	Wayne Taylor	Tiga GC287	1987 Kyalami Group C2 race
Formula Two	1:22.970	John Love	Chevron B25	1973 Highveld 100
500cc	1:24.910	Freddie Spencer	Honda NSR500	1985 South African motorcycle Grand Prix
Group 4	1:25.340	Jochen Mass	BMW M1	1979 1000 km of Kyalami
Group 2	1:27.400	Hans-Joachim Stuck	BMW 3.0 CSL	1975 1000 km of Kyalami
250cc	1:28.140	Mario Rademeyer	Yamaha TZ 250	1985 South African motorcycle Grand Prix
Original Grand Prix Circuit (1st Configuration) (1961–1967): 4.094 km (2.544 mi)
Formula One	1:27.600	Dave Charlton	Brabham BT11	1967 Rand Spring Trophy
Formula Two	1:39.100	Jo Bonnier	Porsche 718/2	1961 Rand Grand Prix

== See also ==
- Francis Tucker
- List of Kyalami Grand Prix Circuit fatalities

== Bibliography ==
- Klopper, Denis (2021). Kyalami Grand Prix Circuit – 60 Years of Memories. Johannesburg: SA Motorsport Memories. ISBN 978-0-620-95195-1.
