= Colorado Springs Socialists =

Socialist organization in Colorado, US

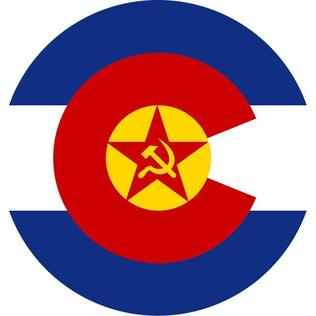
- Founded: 2016
- Dissolved: 2020
- Merged into: Democratic Socialists of America
- Headquarters: Colorado Springs, Co
- Newspaper: Rocky Mountain Revolution
- Ideology: Marxism; Socialism; Non-Tendency
- Political position: Far-left

Website
- cssocialists.com

Colorado Springs Socialists was a small organization located in the city of Colorado Springs, Colorado.

== History ==
The CSS was initially founded as a Marxist reading group in the Autumn of 2016, before developing into a formal political organization in 2017. By late 2018, the group exceeded 100 members, operating on two university campuses and in the city of Pueblo, Colorado. In January 2020 the group announced on their Facebook page that they would be dissolving and merging into the DSA Communist Caucus.

== Ideology ==
The CSS was an organization that holds the position that capitalism must be abolished and replaced with a socialist based political and economic structure. The organization took a non-tendency position on Marxism and Socialism, accepting Democratic Socialists, Anarchists, Libertarian socialists, Left Communists, Maoists and Trotskyists. The CSS was involved in a project called the Marxist Center, an attempt to unite other non-tendency revolutionary socialist organizations across the United States into "the first nation-wide, non-tendency Marxist organization."

== Police infiltration and arrests ==
In March 2017, four members of the CSS were arrested during "March Against Imperialism" protest in downtown Colorado Springs, on charges of obstructing traffic ways, a misdemeanor crime in Colorado. The CSS referred to these arrests as the "Trial of the Socialist Six", alleging The Colorado Springs Police Department took part in outrageous conduct, endangering of protesters, and frequently participating in arbitrary arrests. On August 2, 2017 Colorado Springs Independent writer Nat Stein uncovered body-camera footage of Colorado Springs officers discussing the infiltration of the organization. The Colorado Springs Police Force placed two undercover officers, under the aliases of "Mark" and "Amy", into the CSS as part of a surveillance of the organization.
