= Hollywood Heights, Los Angeles =

Hollywood Heights
- Neighborhood of Los Angeles
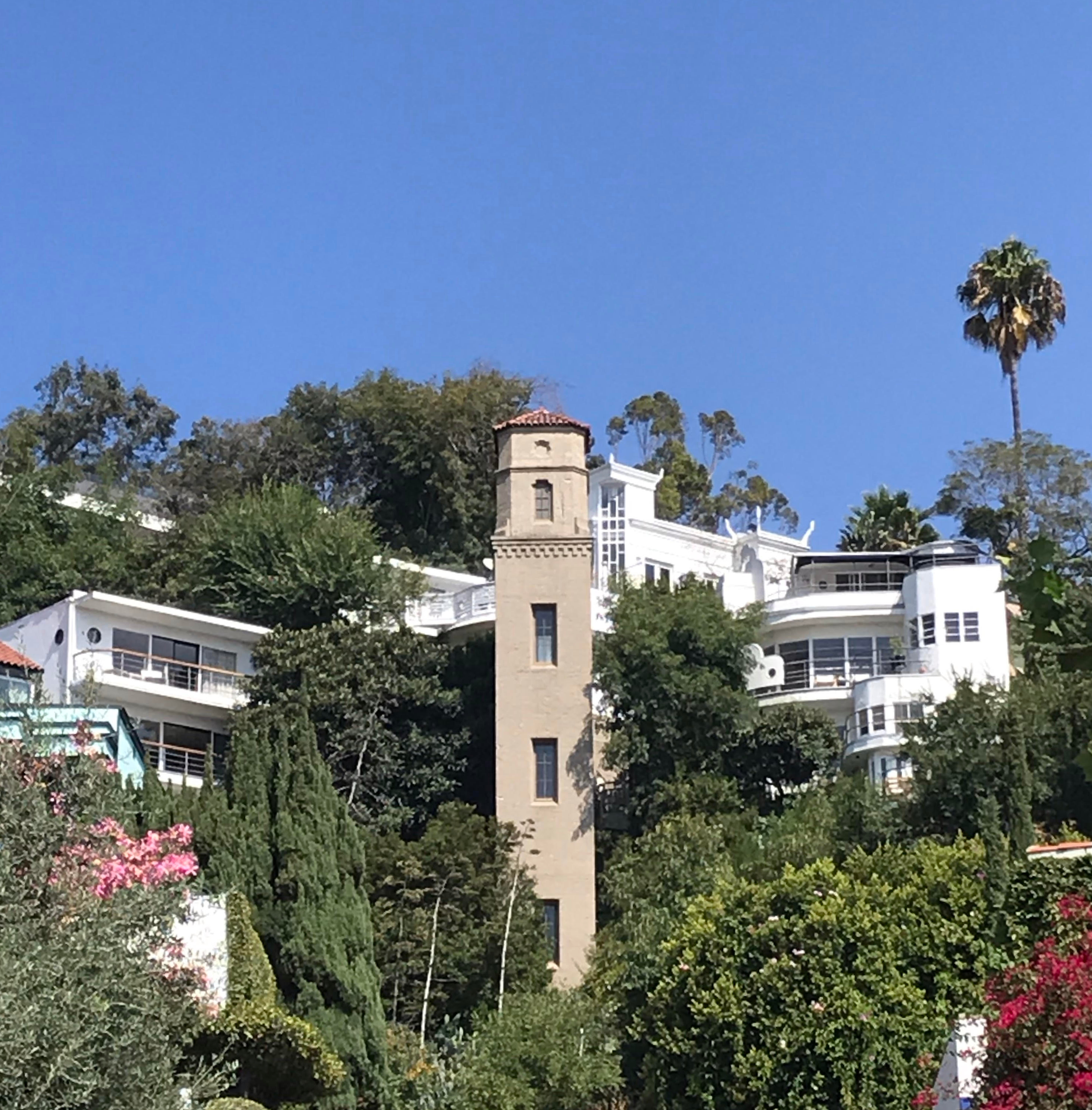
- High Tower

- Location within Los Angeles metropolitan area
- Coordinates: 34.108136°N 118.34258°W
- Country: United States
- State: California
- County: Los Angeles
- City: Los Angeles
- District: Hollywood Hills
- ZIP code(s): 90068
- Area code(s): 323

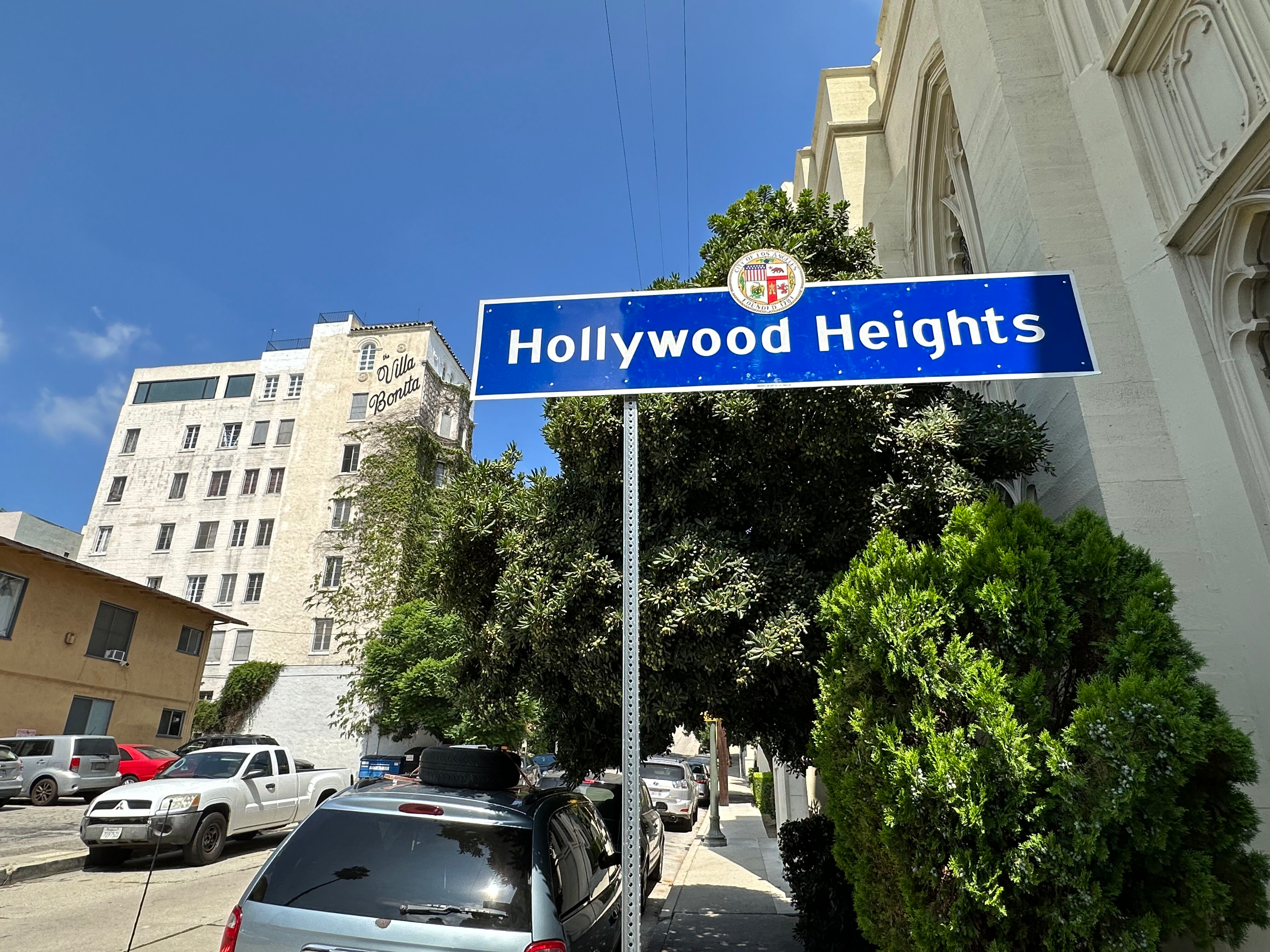
Hollywood Heights Neighborhood Sign on Hillcrest near Franklin

Hollywood Heights is a neighborhood in Los Angeles, bounded by the Hollywood Bowl on the north, Highland Avenue on the east, Outpost Estates in the west, and Franklin Avenue on the south. It includes a number of notable historic homes and buildings and has been home to numerous people in the film and music industries, dating back to the silent film era.

== History ==
Hollywood Heights is situated in what was the northern part of the Rancho La Brea Mexican land grant. H.J. Whitley developed the neighborhood as early as 1902 as part of his Hollywood-Ocean View Tract.

In 2023, the Los Angeles City Council gave Hollywood Heights official status as a Los Angeles neighborhood.

== Notable places ==
The Samuel Freeman House (1962 Glencoe Way) was designed by Frank Lloyd Wright, supervised by Lloyd Wright, and furnished and expanded by Rudolph Schindler. Built in 1923, it is one of four textile block houses built by Frank Lloyd Wright in Los Angeles between 1922 and 1924, and it has the world's first glass-to-glass corner windows. It was known as an avant-garde salon, and the list of individuals who spent significant periods of time there or lived in the house's two Schindler-designed apartments includes John Bovingdon, Beniamino Bufano, Xavier Cugat, Rudi Gernreich, Martha Graham, Philip Johnson, Peter Krasnow, Bella Lewitzky, Jean Negulesco, Richard Neutra, Claude Rains, Herman Sachs, Galka Scheyer, Edward Weston, Olga Zacsek, and Fritz Zwicky. It also served as an intellectual sanctuary for individuals blacklisted by the House Un-American Activities Committee. It is on the National Register of Historic Places.

The High Tower (2178 High Tower Drive) is a five-story, over 100-foot-high tower housing a private elevator. It was built circa 1920 in the style of a Bolognese campanile. The tower provides access to a Streamline Moderne fourplex known as High Tower Court, built between 1935 and 1936. Architect Carl Kay designed both. The High Tower was featured in The Long Goodbye, The High Window, Dead Again, Michael Connelly's novels Echo Park and The Closers, and a 1961 episode of Naked City. It also leads to the Alta Loma Terrace neighborhood, which includes the Otto Bollman House – one of Lloyd Wright's first projects – and the B.A.G. Fuller House (6887 W. Alta Loma Terrace), which is a Los Angeles Historic-Cultural Monument. Residents of the hillside enclave around the tower have included David Copperfield, Michael Connelly, Tim Burton, Timothy Hutton, Kurt Cobain, and Courtney Love.

The Yamashiro Historic District (1999 Sycamore Avenue) is listed on the National Register of Historic Places and consists of nine buildings, including the Yamashiro restaurant. It was built between 1911 and 1914 as a residence by two brothers, Adolph and Eugene Bernheimer, and is said to be a replica of a 17th-century palace in Yamashiro Province in Japan. It has a 600-year-old pagoda imported from Japan. Many films and television shows have been filmed here, including Memoirs of a Geisha and Sayonara. Richard Pryor, Pernell Roberts, Joe Flynn, and Jerry Dunphy lived in apartments on the grounds.

The Magic Castle (7001 Franklin Avenue) is a private nightclub for magicians and magic enthusiasts. It is the premier venue for magic in the United States and is the clubhouse for the Academy of Magical Arts. Originally constructed in 1909 as a châteauesque mansion for banker, real estate developer, and philanthropist Rollin B. Lane, it is a Los Angeles Historic-Cultural Monument.

Highland-Camrose Bungalow Village (2103 N. Highland Avenue) is on the National Register of Historic Places. The Eagles' Don Henley and Bernie Leadon wrote "Witchy Woman" in a bungalow here shared by Linda Ronstadt and JD Souther.

The Villa Bonita (1817 Hillcrest Road) is a Spanish Colonial Revival-style apartment building designed by architect Frank Webster and built in 1929. It is on the National Register of Historic Places. Residents have included Errol Flynn, Francis Ford Coppola, Emma Dunn, Lois Collier, Ethelind Terry, Sarah Marshall, Carl Held, Billy Wirth, and Jim Thompson.

Hollywood United Methodist Church (6817 Franklin Avenue) was designed by Thomas P. Barber and built from 1927 to 1930. It is a Los Angeles Historic-Cultural Monument. It is built on land that includes the location of William C. deMille and daughter Agnes de Mille's first home in Hollywood.

American Legion Post 43 (2035 N. Highland Avenue) is a distinctive example of Egyptian Revival and Moroccan Art Deco architecture. Designed by Weston & Weston architects and completed in 1929, the building is a Los Angeles Historic-Cultural Monument. Its members have included Clark Gable, Stan Lee, Mickey Rooney, Gene Autry, Charlton Heston, and Ronald Reagan. It served as the venue for Los Angeles' longest-running play, Tamara, from 1984 to 1993. It has a 482-seat, state-of-the-art movie theater that was previously a live music venue played by groups including The Doors.

The Hollywood Art Center School (2025-2027 N. Highland Avenue) is a Los Angeles Historic-Cultural Monument. Originally built in 1904 for the artist Otto Classen as his residence and art studio, the estate was designed by famed architects Dennis & Farwell, who also designed the Hollywood Hotel and Magic Castle. The Hollywood Art Center School operated at this location from 1950 to 2000. Phil Roman studied at the school.

Las Orquideas Apartments (1901 N. Orchid Avenue), designed and built by Wilfred Buckland in the late 1920s, are an example of Spanish Colonial Revival architecture meant to evoke an Andalusian village. A Los Angeles Historic-Cultural Monument, its residents have included Wilfred Buckland, Ellen Burstyn, Ray Heindorf, Arthur Lange, and Robert Vaughn.

The DeKeyser Duplex (1911 N. Highland Avenue) was designed by Rudolph Schindler and completed in 1935.

The Abraham Koosis House (1941 Glencoe Way) was designed by Raphael Soriano and completed in 1940.

Koning Eizenberg's Hollywood Duplex (6947 and 6949 Camrose Drive) was built in 1990.

The End of the Road (2042 Pinehurst Road) is the name Carrie Jacobs-Bond gave to her home and was the title of her final book of poetry, published in 1940.

The Franklin Garden Apartments (6917-6933 Franklin Avenue) were an example of Spanish Colonial Revival architecture. Built in 1920, they became a Los Angeles Historic-Cultural Monument on June 7, 1978, but were demolished on July 1, 1978, to expand the Magic Castle's parking lot.

The Shrader House (1927 N. Highland Avenue) was another example of Spanish Colonial Revival architecture. Designed by Mead & Requa and built about 1915, a committee of architects representing the American Institute of Architects selected it as one of the best small houses in Los Angeles; in its February 1920 issue, House Beautiful magazine called it one of the three best homes in Los Angeles. It operated as the Hollywood Wedding Chapel beginning in 1931.

== Notable events ==
From February to April 1964, a ten-week standoff known as the "Siege of Fort Anthony" occurred between Los Angeles County sheriff's deputies and a former Marine named Steven Anthony, who was armed with a shotgun and challenging an eminent domain-based eviction from his home on Alta Loma Terrace. After Anthony's arrest, his home was razed to make room for the Hollywood Museum, which was never built, and parking for the Hollywood Bowl. Bette Davis had lived in the same house when she first moved to Hollywood.

On July 1, 1969, Charles Manson shot a drug dealer named Bernard Crowe in the home of Charles "Tex" Watson's ex-girlfriend, Rosina Kroner, in the Franklin Garden Apartments. Crowe had threatened the Manson Family after being scammed out of $2500 by Watson. Crowe survived the shooting but did not report it to police. Ten years earlier, Manson had lived directly across the street at 6871 Franklin Avenue, in apartment 306 of what was then called the Bienvenue Hotel Apartments. At that time, he ran a bogus talent agency, 3-Star Enterprises, that also served as a front for a prostitution ring, and he was arrested twice in 1959 while living there.

The Divine Light Mission in America was started in a house at 6861 Alta Loma Terrace. Its leader, Guru Maharaj Ji, spoke there in 1971 when he arrived in the United States from India at age 13.

The band Crowded House adopted its name while living in a small, two-bedroom house at 1902 N. Sycamore Avenue (just behind the Magic Castle) in 1986 while recording their first album, Crowded House. Capitol Records launched the band at a party at Yamashiro Restaurant, just up the street from the house.

On February 22, 2001, Ashton Kutcher discovered his girlfriend stabbed to death in her home on Pinehurst Road by a serial killer dubbed the Hollywood Ripper.

== Schools ==
Residents are zoned to Gardner Street Elementary, Hubert Howe Bancroft Middle School (which contains performing arts and STE[+a]M magnets), and Hollywood High School in the Los Angeles Unified School District.

Hollywood Heights is also home to The Oaks School, a private elementary school (grades K-6) on the grounds of the Hollywood United Methodist Church.

== Places of worship ==
Hollywood United Methodist Church

== Transportation ==
The nearest Metro station is Hollywood/Highland, on the B Line.

== Notable residents ==
- Ben Affleck and Matt Damon (actors and screenwriters) developed the script to Good Will Hunting in part while living at 1997 Glencoe Way in 1995.
- Dustin Lance Black (screenwriter, director, producer, and activist) lived in a bungalow at 6915 Camrose Drive when he wrote Milk, and Margot Robbie subsequently purchased his home.
- Jackson Browne, Glenn Frey, Don Henley, Linda Ronstadt, and JD Souther (musicians) developed the California Sound of the 1970s while neighbors in the area around High Tower and the Highland-Camrose Bungalow Village.
- Wilfred Buckland (Hollywood's first art director) lived at several locations in the neighborhood, including a house he built a house at 1922 N. Sycamore Avenue as well as 1954 Pinehurst Rd. and 2035 Pinehurst Rd. Buckland designed and built the Las Orquideas Apartments on Orchid Avenue, once known as the Wilfred Buckland Bungalow Apartments. Buckland killed his disabled son and himself at their home on Pinehurst Road in 1946.
- Edgar Rice Burroughs (writer) began writing Tarzan's Quest while living at 2029 Pinehurst Road in 1934.
- Adriana Caselotti (the voice of Snow White in Snow White and the Seven Dwarfs) lived on Alta Loma Terrace from 1930-1975.
- Kurt Cobain and Courtney Love (musicians) lived at 6881 Alta Loma Terrace in the early 1990s when their daughter, Frances Bean Cobain, was born and briefly taken from their custody. They shared the home with Hole drummer Patty Schemel. Cobain wrote much of In Utero while living there. Montage of Heck features scenes from the home.
- Michael Connelly (writer) lived at High Tower in the late 1990s while looking for inspiration for his novels.
- Bette Davis (actress) lived at 6655 Alta Loma Terrace when she first moved to Hollywood in 1930. The house was later the focus of the "Siege of Fort Anthony" and was demolished.
- Robert Edeson (actor) lived at 2029 Pinehurst Road for seven years until his death in 1931.
- William Faulkner (writer) stayed in the Highland Hotel at 1921 N. Highland Avenue for extended periods of time in the 1940s while working as a screenwriter.
- Neil Finn, Paul Hester, and Nick Seymour (musicians) of the band Crowded House lived at 1902 N. Sycamore in 1986 while recording their first album, Crowded House.
- B.A.G. Fuller (philosopher) lived at 6887 Alta Loma Terrace for 24 years until his death in 1956. His house is a Los Angeles Historic-Cultural Monument.
- Ray Heindorf (composer) and Arthur Lange (bandleader) shared an apartment in Las Orchidas Apartments at 1903 Orchid Avenue in 1930.
- Carl Held and Sarah Marshall (actors) lived together in Villa Bonita until her death in 2014.
- Victoria Hochberg (director) is on the board of the Hollywood Heights Association.
- Carrie Jacobs-Bond (singer and songwriter) built a home at 2042 Pinehurst Road and lived there from 1917 until her death in 1946. The house was a salon for visiting art lovers and was the eponym for her final book of poetry, The End of the Road.
- Charles Manson (criminal) lived and worked in an apartment at 6871 Franklin Avenue when he first moved to Hollywood in the late 1950s. A decade later, in 1969, he shot a man at the Franklin Garden Apartments directly across Orchid Ave.
- Seena Owen (actress) lived at 6933 Camrose Drive the final 20 years of her life, until her death in 1966.
- Granville Redmond (artist and actor) lived at 2040 High Tower Drive and 2009 Pinehurst Road in the final years of his life.
- Lloyd Rigler (industrialist) lived at 2047 Pinehurst Road and was a major philanthropist in Hollywood.
- E. Roscoe Shrader (artist) lived and worked at 1927 N. Highland Avenue while he was the dean of the Otis Art Institute and during his first two terms as president of the California Art Club. At his studio here, he formed the Group of Eight, which included artists such as Mabel Alvarez.
- Doug Timm (composer) was murdered in his home on Camrose Drive in 1989.
- Theo Wilson (reporter) lived at 2041 Glencoe Way for 25 years until her death in 1997; the intersection of Glencoe Way and Camrose Drive bears her name.
- Morgan Woodward (actor) lived at 2111 Rockledge Road until his death in 2019.
