= Ida M. Rice House =

Historic house in Colorado, United States

- U.S. National Register of Historic Places
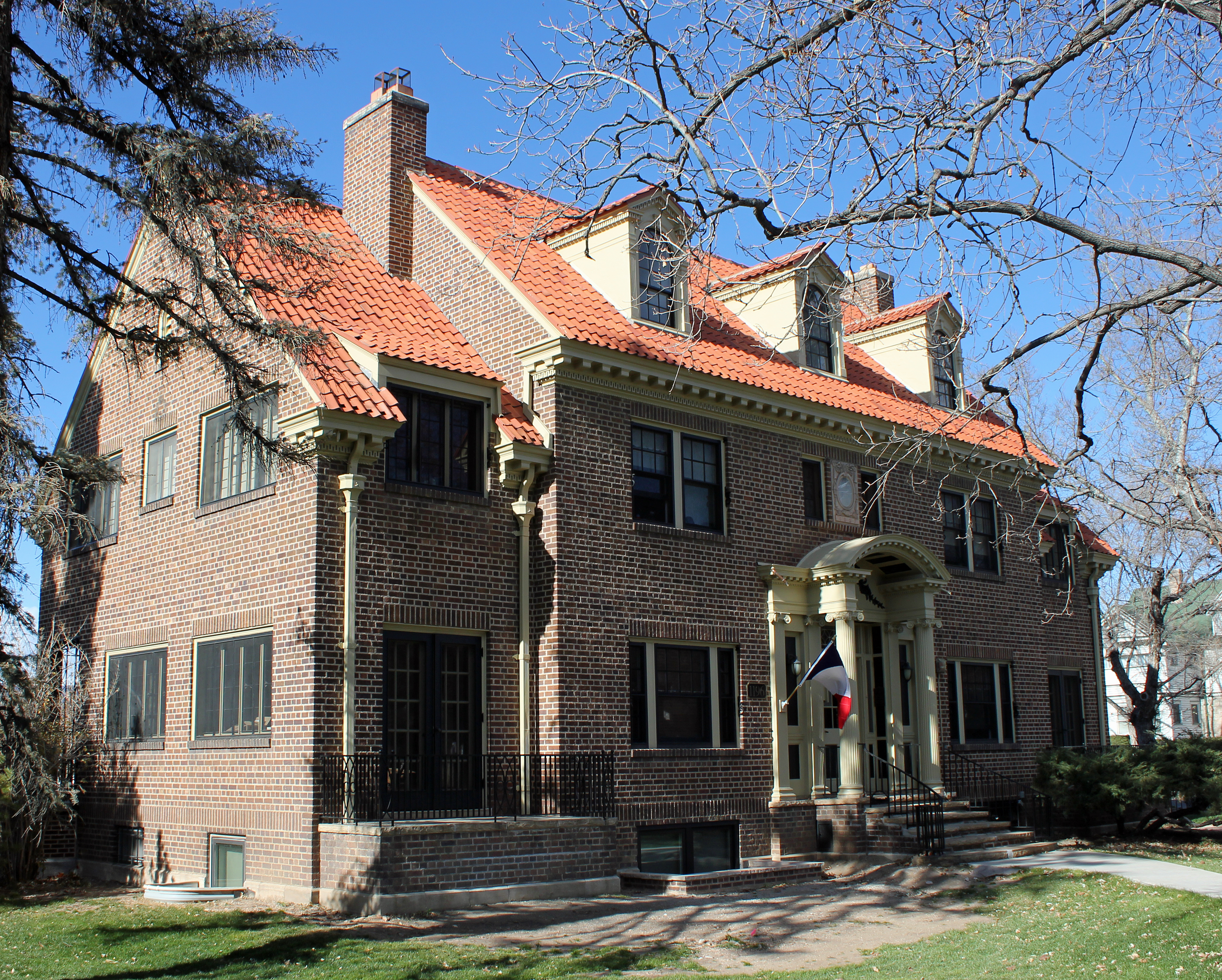

- Location within Colorado Location within the United States
- Location: 1196 N. Cascade Ave., Colorado Springs, Colorado
- Coordinates: 38°51′2″N 104°49′28″W
- Area: less than one acre
- Built: 1927
- Architect: Thomas P. Barber
- Architectural style: Colonial Revival
- NRHP reference No.: 06001049
- Added to NRHP: November 21, 2006

The Ida M. Rice House, also known as Haskell House, is a Colonial Revival style building in Colorado Springs, Colorado that was built in 1927. It was designed by Thomas P. Barber.

It was listed on the National Register of Historic Places in 2006.

As of 2010 it was used by Colorado College.

== See also ==
- National Register of Historic Places listings in El Paso County, Colorado
