= Clubhouse-Student Union =

Two historic buildings in Colorado, US

- Clubhouse--Student Union
- U.S. National Register of Historic Places
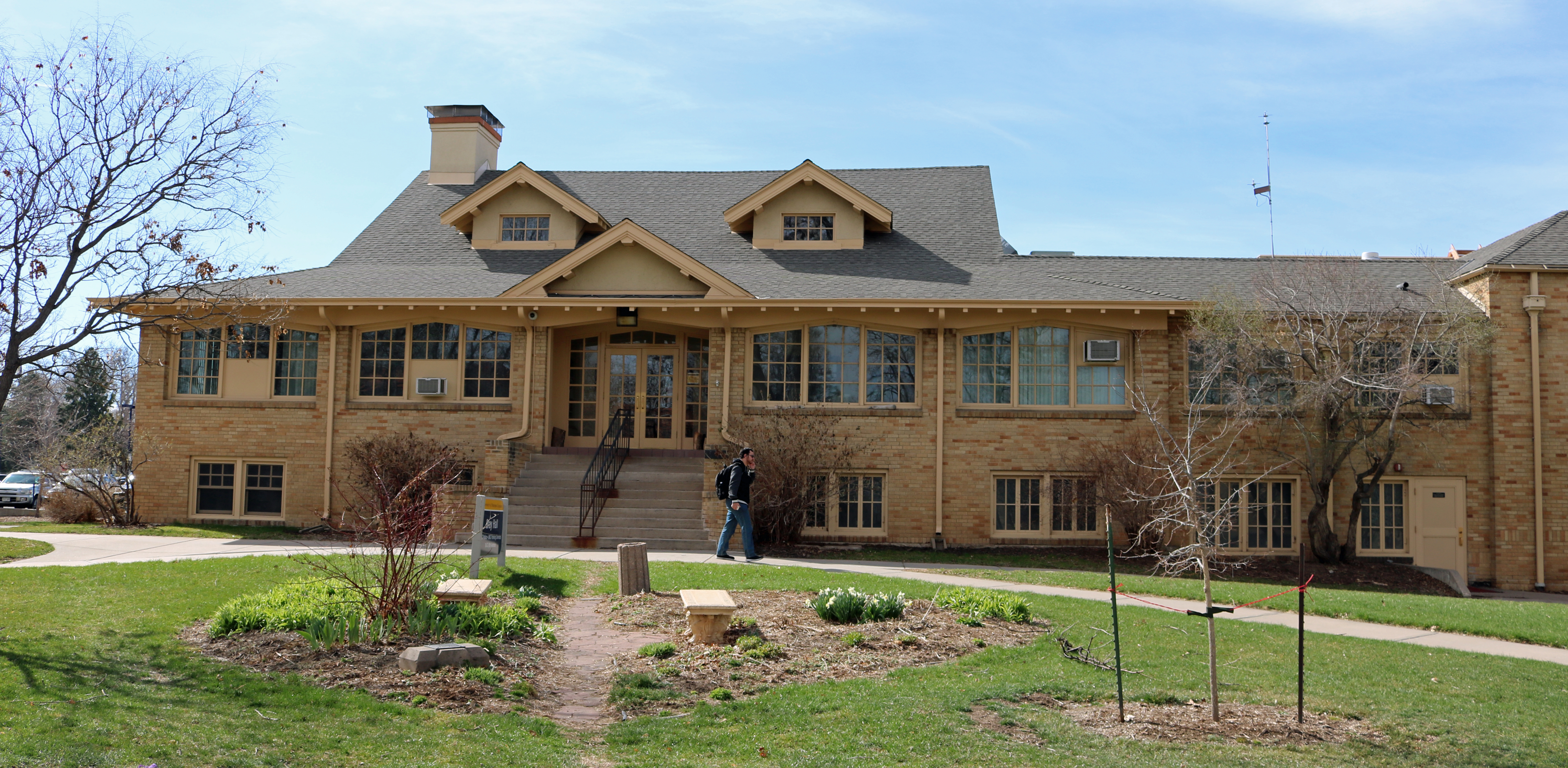

- Location within Colorado Location within the United States
- Location: Between 18th & 19th Streets, & 8th & 10th Avenues, Greeley, Colorado
- Coordinates: 40°24′35″N 104°41′31″W
- Area: less than one acre
- Built: 1916
- Architect: Thomas P. Barber; F. W. Ireland, Jr.
- Architectural style: Bungalow/craftsman, Late Gothic Revival
- MPS: New Deal Resources on Colorado's Eastern Plains MPS
- NRHP reference No.: 08001021
- Added to NRHP: October 29, 2008

The Clubhouse-Student Union, also known as Gray Hall, is a structure made of two historic buildings on the campus of the University of Northern Colorado in Greeley, Colorado. It is listed on the National Register of Historic Places.

== History ==
Construction on the first building began during the presidency of Zachariah Xenophon Snyder in 1913, and it was completed in 1916. The second building was completed with the help of the Public Works Administration in 1939.

The 1916 building was built as a women's clubhouse for female students. Since 1932, it has been a clubhouse open to all students. The structure is now home to the student union.

== Architectural significance ==
The buildings were designed in the Craftsman and Gothic Revival architectural styles. The 1916 building was designed by Thomas P. Barber, while the second building was designed by F. W. Ireland, Jr. The structure has been listed on the National Register of Historic Places since October 29, 2008.
