= Methodist Episcopal Church of Montrose =

Historic church in Colorado, United States

- U.S. National Register of Historic Places
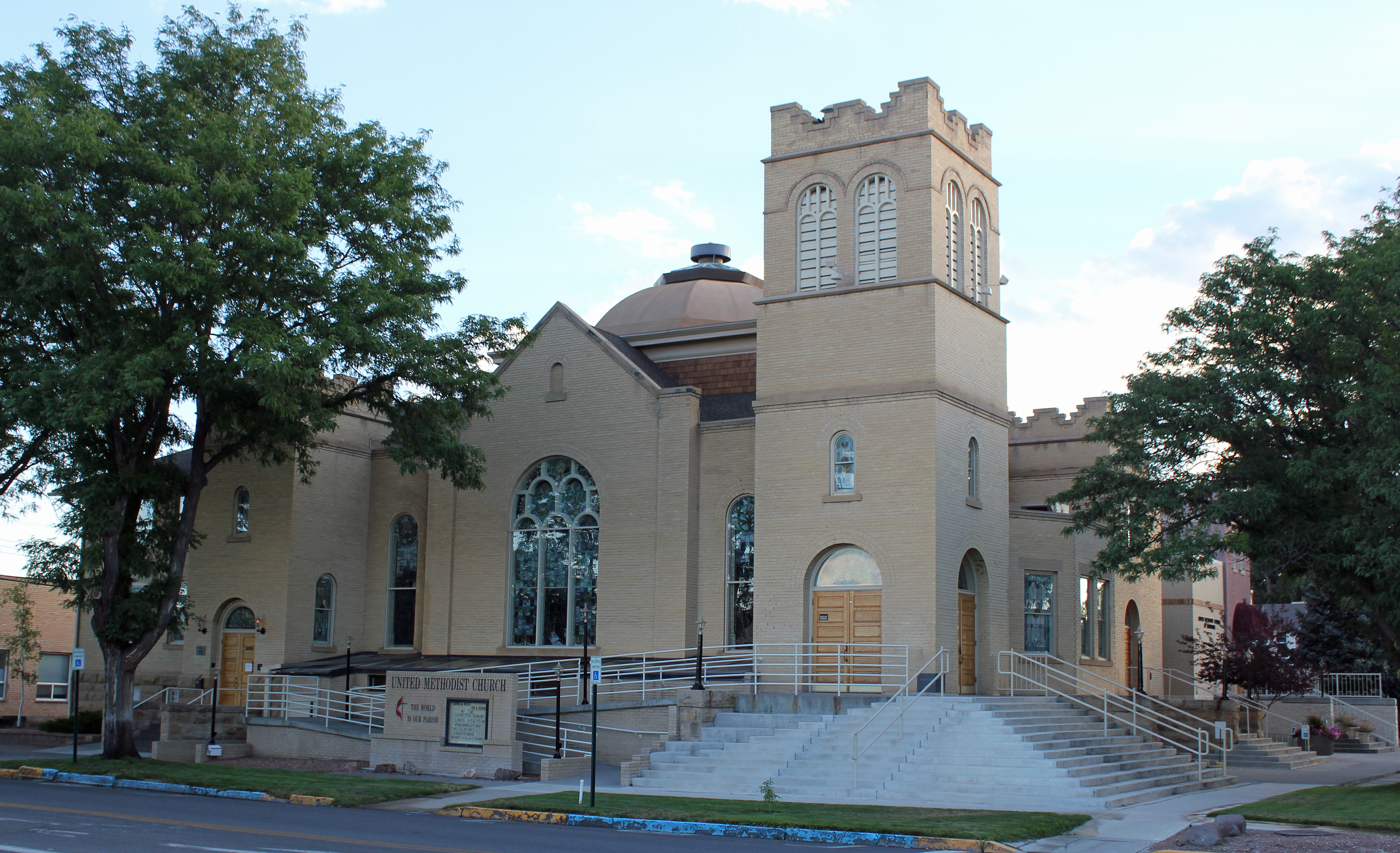
- The church in 2014.

- Location within Colorado Location within the United States
- Location: 19 S. Park Ave., Montrose, Colorado
- Coordinates: 38°28′50″N 107°52′24″W
- Built: 1920
- Architect: Thomas P. Barber, Patrik Davis
- Architectural style: Romanesque
- NRHP reference No.: 99001407
- Added to NRHP: November 30, 1999

The Methodist Episcopal Church of Montrose, also known as the United Methodist Church of Montrose, is a historic church in Montrose, Colorado, United States. It was designed circa 1909 as an Akron Plan church by Thomas P. Barber, but it was not completed until 1920. A 1991 addition was designed by Parik Davis.
