= Highland-Camrose Bungalow Village =

- U.S. National Register of Historic Places
- U.S. Historic district
- Los Angeles Historic-Cultural Monument
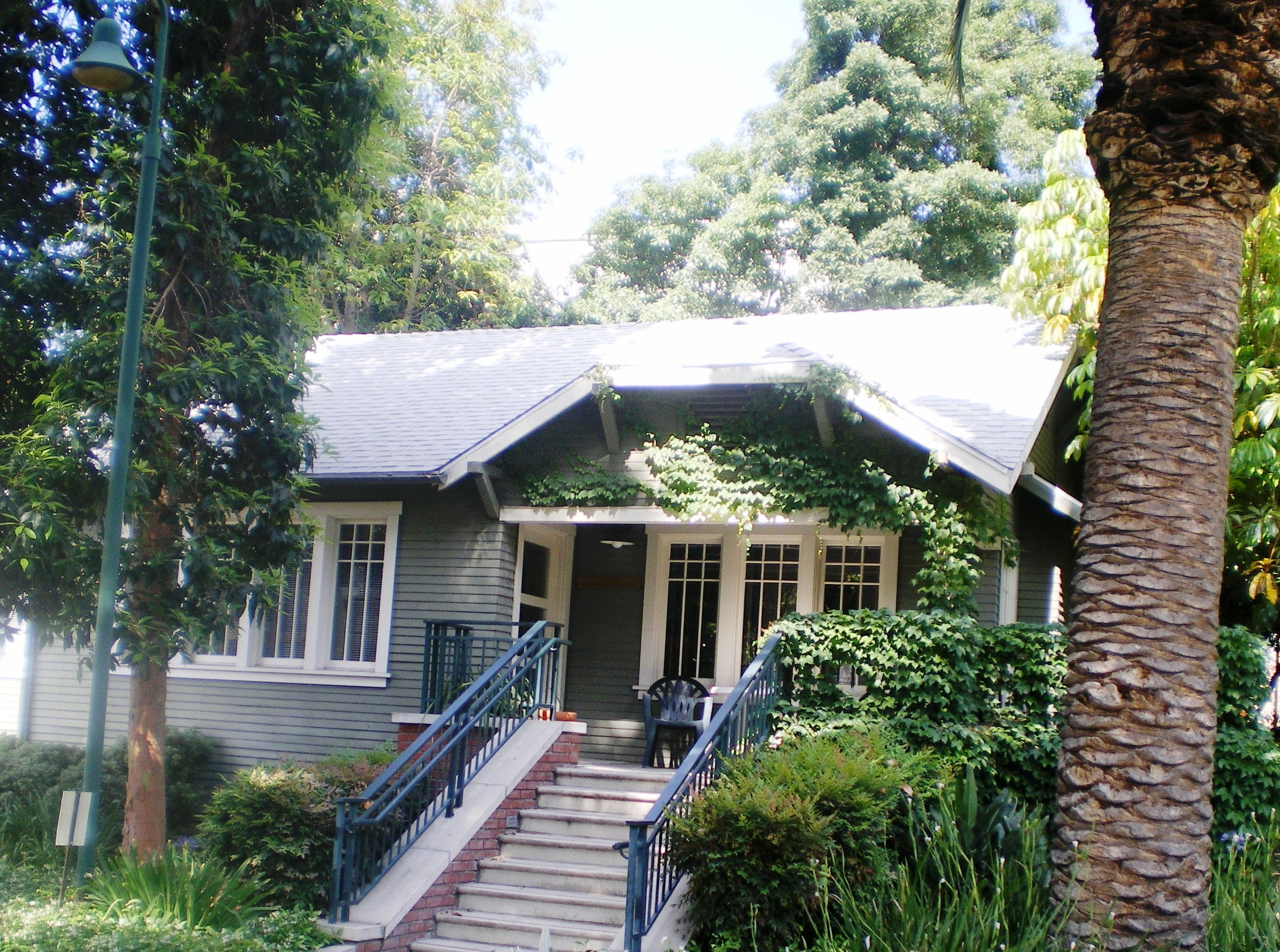
- Highland-Camrose Bungalow Village in 2008

- Location within the Los Angeles metropolitan area Location within California Location within the United States
- Location: Northwest corner of Highland and Camrose Avenues, Hollywood, Los Angeles, California
- Coordinates: 34°6′31″N 118°20′15″W
- Area: 1.6 acres (0.65 ha)
- Architect: Taylor Brothers; Campbell, Lee
- Architectural style: Bungalow/Craftsman
- NRHP reference No.: 89000198
- LAHCM No.: 291

Significant dates
- Added to NRHP: March 16, 1989
- Designated LAHCM: April 23, 1985

The Highland-Camrose Bungalow Village is a grouping of Craftsman style bungalows located at the northwest corner of Highland and Camrose Avenues in Hollywood, Los Angeles, California. The bungalows were designed by the Taylor Brothers and Lee Campbell as residences. The bungalows were later converted to offices, which are occupied by various organizations affiliated with the nearby Hollywood Bowl, including the Los Angeles Philharmonic Orchestra.

In 1989, the bungalow village was added to the National Register of Historic Places.

The listing included 16 contributing buildings, a contributing structure (stone walls), and a contributing site (landscaping).

== See also ==
- Los Angeles Historic-Cultural Monuments in Hollywood
- List of Registered Historic Places in Los Angeles
- Hollywood Heights, Los Angeles
