= Thomas P. Barber =

English-born American architect (1863–1932)

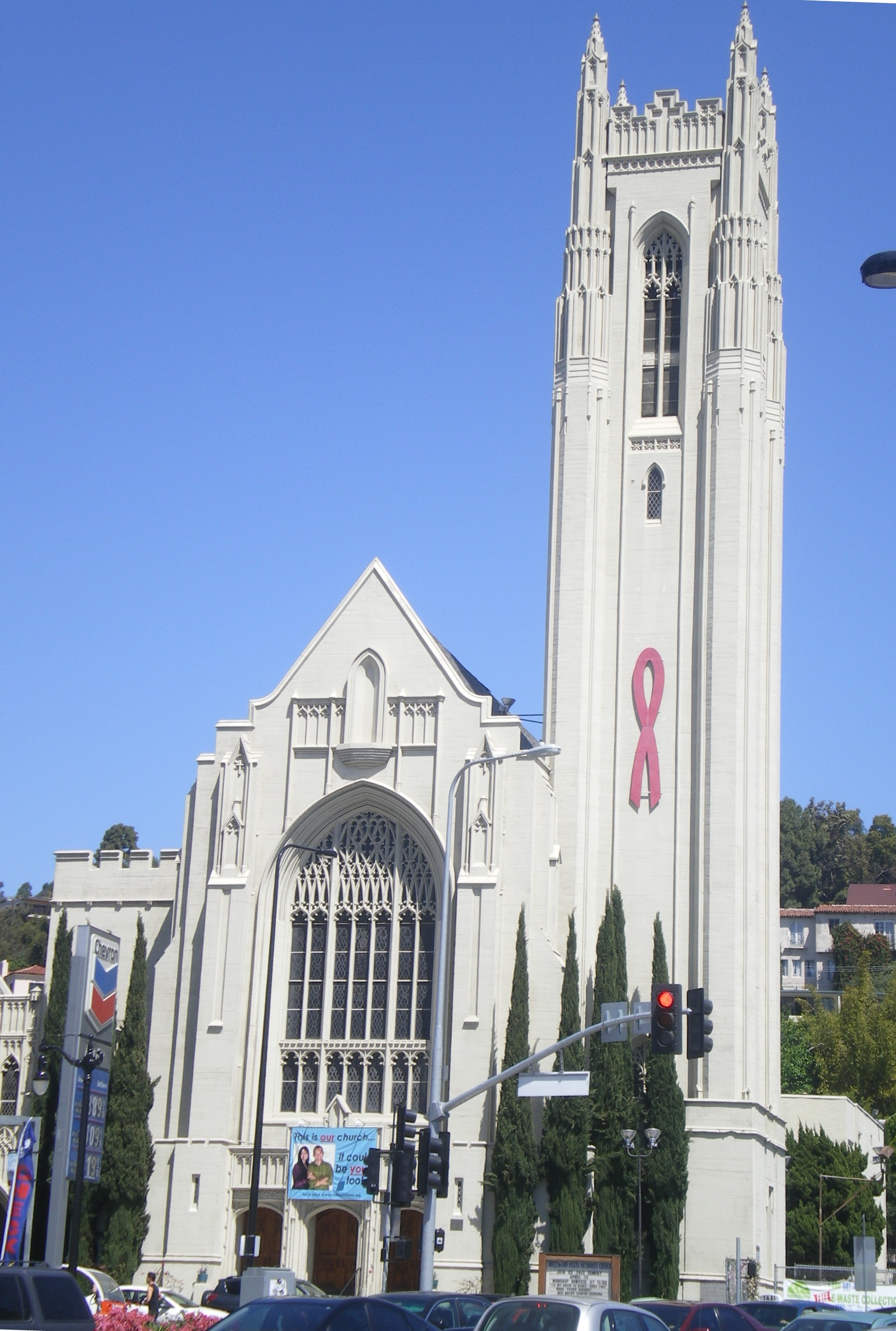
Hollywood United Methodist Church

Thomas Pellatt Barber (January 31, 1863, Colchester, England – December 27, 1932, Glendale, California) was an architect active in the Southwestern United States. Several of his works are listed on the U.S. National Register of Historic Places.

== Life ==
Barber's family moved to the United States from England while he was still an infant. They first settled in Illinois and then moved to Colorado Springs, where he received his education. By the late 1880s, he had partnered with L. A. Pease, to form the architectural firm of Pease and Barber, which specialized in ecclesiastical buildings.

By 1900, Barber was working alone but formed a partnership in 1902 with his brother, William, which lasted until 1920. He moved to Los Angeles, California, in 1927.

Barber died at his home in Glendale, California, on December 27, 1932.

== Works ==
Thomas Barber designed a number of buildings that are listed on the National Register of Historic Places:

- 1897: DeGraff Building, 116–118 N. Tejon, Colorado Springs, CO (Barber & Hastings)
- 1902: St. Mary's Cathedral, 26 West Kiowa Street, Colorado Springs, CO (Barber, Pease, and Murdoch)
- 1904: Colorado Springs City Hall, 107 N. Nevada Ave., Colorado Springs, CO (Barber & MacLaren)
- 1911: First Methodist Episcopal Church, 216 Broom Street, Trinidad, CO
- 1916: Clubhouse-Student Union, between 18th & 19th Sts., & 8th & 10th Aves., Greeley, CO (Barber & Ireland)
- 1920: Methodist Episcopal Church of Montrose, 19 South Park Avenue, Montrose, CO
- 1927: Ida M. Rice House, 1196 N. Cascade Ave., Colorado Springs, CO
- 1930: Hollywood United Methodist Church, 6817 Franklin Avenue, Los Angeles, CA
- 1932: McCarty Memorial Christian Church, reinforced concrete, 1920s, Gothic, 4101 W. Adams Blvd., Los Angeles, CA (Barber & Kingsbury)

Other notable works include:

- 1911: First United Methodist Church, 300 E. Main, Missoula, MT
- 1923: Argo Hall at the Colorado School for the Deaf and Blind, Colorado Springs, CO
- 1928: First United Methodist Church, 1338 Santa Clara Street, Ventura, CA
