= Theo Wilson =

American journalist (1917–1997)

- Born: Theodora Nadelstein; May 22, 1917; Brooklyn, New York, United States
- Died: January 17, 1997 (aged 79); Hollywood, California
- Occupation: Journalist
- Years active: 1937-1996
- Spouse: William Robert “Bob” Wilson
- Children: Delph R. Wilson

Theo Wilson (born Theodora Nadelstein, May 22, 1917 – January 17, 1997) was an American reporter best known for her coverage of high-profile court cases of serial killers, assassinations and radicals for the Daily News of New York including those of Patty Hearst, Sirhan Sirhan, and Charles Manson

== Early life ==
She was born in Brooklyn, New York, to Adolph and Rebecca Nadelstein. Adolph was the founder of Nadelstein Press. Her early publications include a story on the family's pet monkey for a national magazine, published when she was eight years old, and numerous poems, short stories, plays, and articles produced at Girls High School in Brooklyn.

== Career ==
At the University of Kentucky, she worked at The Kentucky Kernel as a columnist and associate editor. After graduating Phi Beta Kappa in 1937, she was hired by the Evansville Press in Indiana and was soon promoted to tri-state editor. After working in Evansville, she moved to Indianapolis to marry television newscaster Bob Wilson and got a job on the Indianapolis Times. She later worked at the News Leader in Richmond, Virginia, where she began reporting on court cases, then at the Associated Press bureau in Philadelphia and the Philadelphia Bulletin before she and her husband moved back to her hometown of New York in 1952 and she was hired at the Daily News.

In her career there, Wilson reported on the headliner trials of Sam Sheppard, Patty Hearst, Sirhan Sirhan, Charles Manson, Jack Ruby, Angela Davis, David “Son of Sam” Berkowitz and Claus von Bulow.

Since she covered so many major trials for the Daily News, with enough of them taking place in California, the paper suggested she open a West Coast bureau. The Los Angeles bureau opened in 1973 with Wilson as the primary correspondent. One problem that arose for her in Southern California was that like many New Yorkers, she did not drive. In 1976, when a school bus driver and the 26 children in his care were kidnapped in a small town 200 miles north of Los Angeles, she hailed a taxi to take her there.

Following changes at the Daily News, Wilson accepted a buyout in 1982. She continued to write as a freelance journalist, covering trials for newspapers and cable television shows.

== Personal life ==
Wilson divorced Bob Wilson in 1960. They had a son, Delph, born in 1946. She later developed a relationship with fellow journalist Doc Quigg.

She was friends with celebrity journalist Dorothy Kilgallen.

Her memoir, Headline Justice, was published in 1996.

== Death ==
Wilson died on January 17, 1997, in Los Angeles from a cerebral hemorrhage.

== Legacy ==
Theo Wilson Square, an intersection in the Hollywood Heights neighborhood of Los Angeles, where she lived for 25 years, was named for her in 1997.

== Awards ==
- 1972: Front Page Award for best news story on deadline
