= Colorado Springs Business Journal =

US weekly business periodical

- Type: Weekly business newspaper
- Owner(s): Colorado Publishing Company
- Founder(s): Chuck Sheldon and Roger Powell
- Founded: April 1, 1989
- Ceased publication: December 27, 2023
- Headquarters: 31 Platte Avenue, Colorado Springs, Colorado
- ISSN: 1062-810X
- Website: csbj.com

Colorado Springs Business Journal, founded in 1989, was a weekly business periodical for Colorado Springs, Colorado. In 2022, it was merged into the Colorado Springs Independent, which ceased publication a year later.

== History ==
Chuck Shelden, Carl Hanner and Roger Powell founded the Colorado Springs Business Journal on April 1, 1989. Its first office was in the DeGraff Building on S. Tejon and it was first a twice a month publication. By 1993 it had become a weekly publication, had 15 staff members and moved to 31 E. Platte Avenue. In 1998 Shelden and Powell sold the journal to the Dolan Media Group, which is based in Minneapolis, Minnesota and also published the Colorado Springs Military Newspaper Group. As reported in 2005 and 2010, there were 20 people on staff. In 2012, the Business Journal was sold by Dolan to the Colorado Springs Independent. Colorado Publishing Company. Its revenue was below $5 million in 2005 and above $5 million in 2010.

In December 2022, it was announced the Colorado Springs Business Journal would merge with the Colorado Springs Independent and Pikes Peak Bulletin into a new publication called Sixty35 News Magazine. The publication had its name changed back to Colorado Springs Independent in March 2023. The Colorado Springs Business Journal was published as a section in the newspaper and at the same time maintained its own website. On December 20, 2023, publisher Fran Zankowski announced the Colorado Springs Independent 's last issue would be published on Dec. 27, with the Colorado Springs Business Journal ceasing as a result.

In February 2024, Zankowski sold the rights to publish the Colorado Springs Independent and Colorado Springs Business Journal to business partners J.W. Roth and Kevin O’Neil. The paper officially relaunched on May 16, 2024. Fourteen months later, the new owners laid off all staff and sold the Independent and Business Journal to Dirk R. Hobbs and Colorado Media Group. He planned to relaunch the Independent and fold the Business Journal into Southern Colorado Business Forum & Digest.

== Overview ==
It is one of four major print media in Colorado Springs as of 2013. At that time the others were The Gazette, Colorado Springs Independent (the Independent), and The Employment News.

It was the city's primary source of business information and news, covering health care industries, tourism, finance, real estate, retailing, wholesaling, management, technology, law, communications and transportation. Special sections included Best of Springs Business, Rising Stars, Book of Lists and Women of Influence. It was one of the city's named resources for new and existing businesses.

It has been Better Business Bureau accredited since March 24, 2000. As of June, 2013, it had an A+ rating.
