= McCarty Memorial Christian Church =

- U.S. National Register of Historic Places
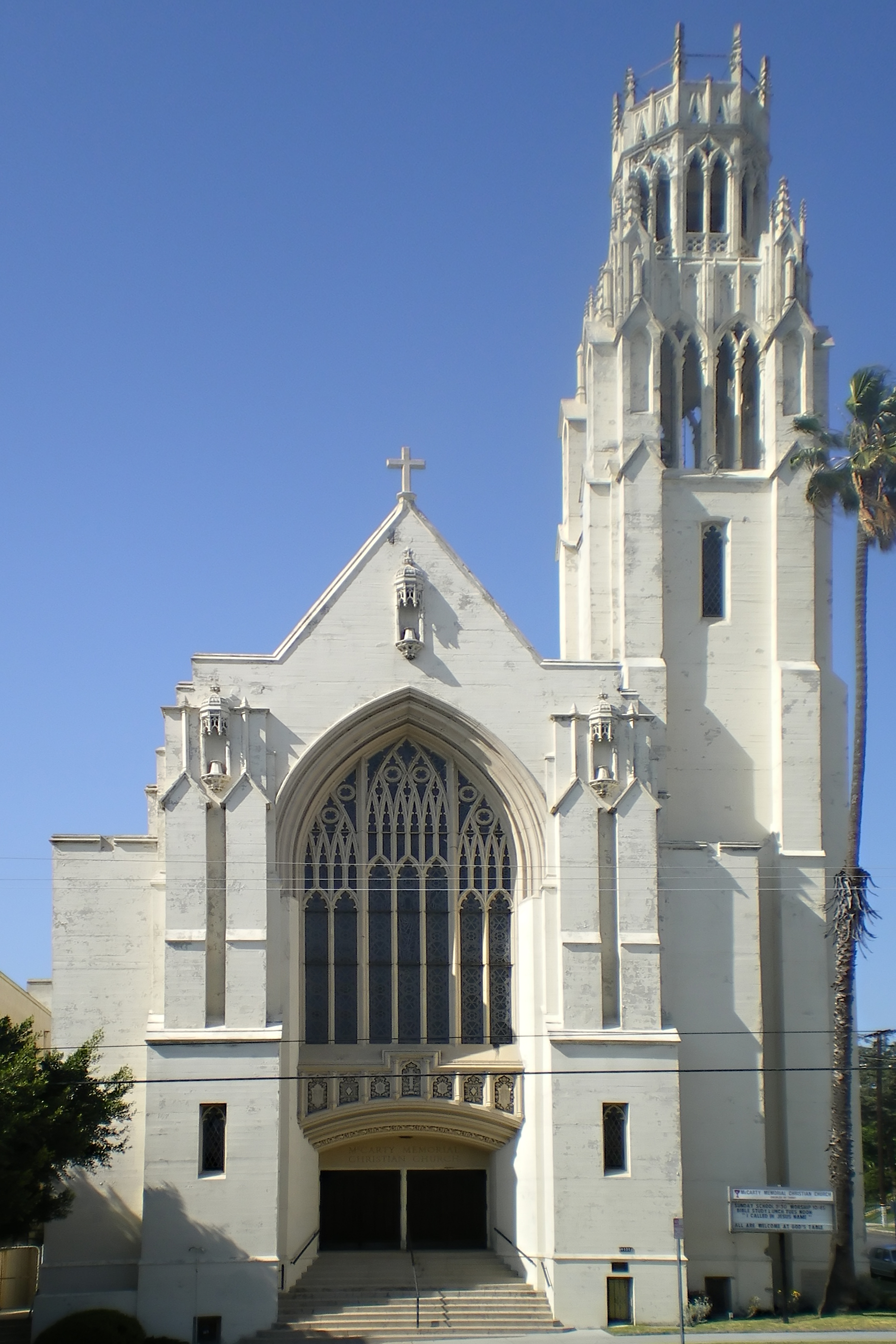

- Location within the Los Angeles metropolitan area Location within California Location within the United States
- Location: 4101 West Adams Boulevard; Los Angeles, California
- Coordinates: 34.03294°N 118.32983°W
- Built: 1932
- Architect: Barber, Thomas P.; Kingsbury, Paul
- Architectural style: Late Gothic Revival
- NRHP reference No.: 01001456
- Added to NRHP: January 17, 2002

McCarty Memorial Christian Church is a Gothic Revival church of the Christian Church (Disciples of Christ) located at 4101 West Adams Boulevard in the West Adams Terrace neighborhood of the West Adams district in Los Angeles. McCarty was founded in 1932 as a white congregation, and gained attention when it integrated and became a multi-racial congregation in the mid-1950s.

== Architecture ==
The church was built in 1932 in the English Gothic Revival style. Among the Church's notable features are stained glass windows with intricate Gothic tracery, arcaded ambulatories, and a 130-foot landmark tower with an elaborate open belfry. The church was listed in the National Register of Historic Places in January 2002. Three months later, McCarty was one of 18 Los Angeles structures to be awarded a "Preserve L.A." grant from the J. Paul Getty Trust. The grant was provided to review historical documentation of the church, assess current materials and condition, and develop a maintenance plan and schedule. The authors of An Architectural Guidebook to Los Angeles call McCarty an excellent example of the city's reinforced-concrete churches of the late 1920s and describe the architectural style as "Gothic, partially English, and partially French."

== History ==
=== Early history ===
The church was built and paid for by Dr. and Mrs. Isaac A. McCarty, who had traveled widely in the United States and Europe "studying church architecture against the time when they were ready to further the Kingdom of God." The church was dedicated in May 1932 on the McCartys' 45th wedding anniversary. The Los Angeles Times reported that the church was "built and furnished at a cost of $250,000 on a $30,000 site." Dr. McCarty imported many of the interior features from Czechoslovakia. The Times called the church, designed by Thomas P. Barber and Paul Kingsbury, "one of the finest examples of pure Gothic architecture in America." The dedication ceremony was attended by Los Angeles Mayor John Porter and Charles C. Chapman. Dr. McCarty died two years later in May 1934, and his funeral was held at the church he built.

The founding pastor at McCarty was Dr. Bruce Brown, who served as the pastor until 1942 and died in 1957. Brown was succeeded by Dr. O. James Sowell, who was pastor from 1942 until 1952, when he left the church to become an evangelist. He was next followed by the Rev. James Clark Brown, who served as pastor for seven months from 1952 to 1953.

=== Integration under the Rev. Kring Allen ===
The Rev. Kring Allen was credited with successfully integrating the McCarty Church. Interviewed by the Los Angeles Times in 1967, Allen, who had been the pastor at McCarty since 1954, noted: "Our neighborhood is 85% Negro. So's our church, I would guess, although I don't know. You lose your color sense when you stop thinking about it. I lost mine." When Allen arrived, the church's membership had dropped to 370 members, down from 1,500 in the 1930s. McCarty Church in 1954 was a faltering congregation, plagued by urban problems in a "changing neighborhood." Allen brought plans that were considered "radical" at the time. He recalled, "I came with the understanding with my board here that this church was going to integrate or I wouldn't stay. ... When some of the board wanted to go in a segregated way, I said: 'I won't go that road, and if you go it, you go without me.' I spent most of the first six months in the public library, reading up on Negro history. ... We get brainwashed. We downgrade the Negro and upgrade the white. We fix our stereotypes. That's the trouble with most white people like me. I wrote a lot of churches asking for advice. The Riverside Church at New York ... told me to 'go slow, or you'll tear your church to pieces.' But I didn't want to go slow." Things were difficult at first, but Allen recalled that things started to gel when he took 70 parishioners, black and white, to a camp in the San Bernardino Mountains where they "housed together, worked together, studied together." They came back from the camp as "a completely integrated nucleus." He became an advocate for integration of churches, noting, "Integration is basic to the Gospel. ... The church is either going to pass through this fire, or the church has had it. There can be no more segregated churches. The whole movement of history is against it."

== See also ==
- List of Registered Historic Places in Los Angeles

People

- Don A. Allen, member of the California State Assembly and of the Los Angeles City Council in the 1940s and 1950s, attended McCarty Memorial
