= First Methodist Episcopal Church (Trinidad, Colorado) =

Historic church in Colorado, United States

- U.S. National Register of Historic Places
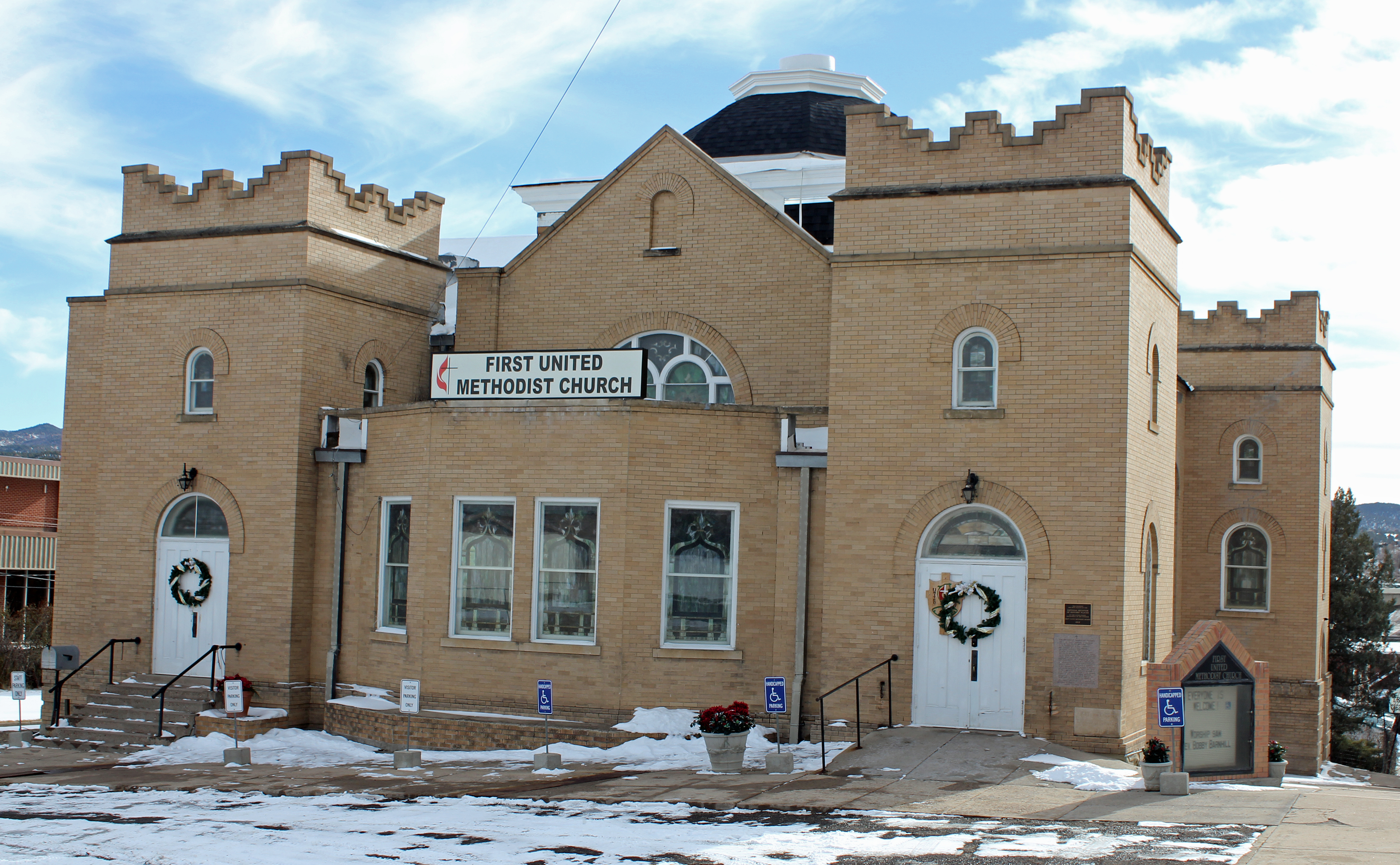

- Location within Colorado Location within the United States
- Location: 216 Broom St., Trinidad, Colorado
- Coordinates: 37.1735863°N 104.5111014°W
- Area: less than one acre
- Built: 1911
- Architect: Thomas P. Barber
- Architectural style: Romanesque
- NRHP reference No.: 05000783
- Added to NRHP: August 7, 2005

The First Methodist Episcopal Church in Trinidad, Colorado, which has also been known as the First United Methodist Church, is a historic church at 216 Broom Street. It was built in 1911 and was added to the National Register in 2005.

It was deemed "a good local example of an ecclesiastical interpretation of the Romanesque Revival style. Its metal-clad, central dome roof is a distinctive feature within Trinidad's architectural heritage, as is its yellow brick construction. Dome roofs are not often seen in Romanesque Revival churches in Colorado and red brick was the material of choice for the majority of Trinidad's buildings. The church also reflects important elements of the Akron Plan, a Protestant church design utilized during the late 19th and early 20th centuries."
