= Villa Bonita =

Apartment building in Los Angeles, California

- U.S. National Register of Historic Places
- Los Angeles Historic-Cultural Monument
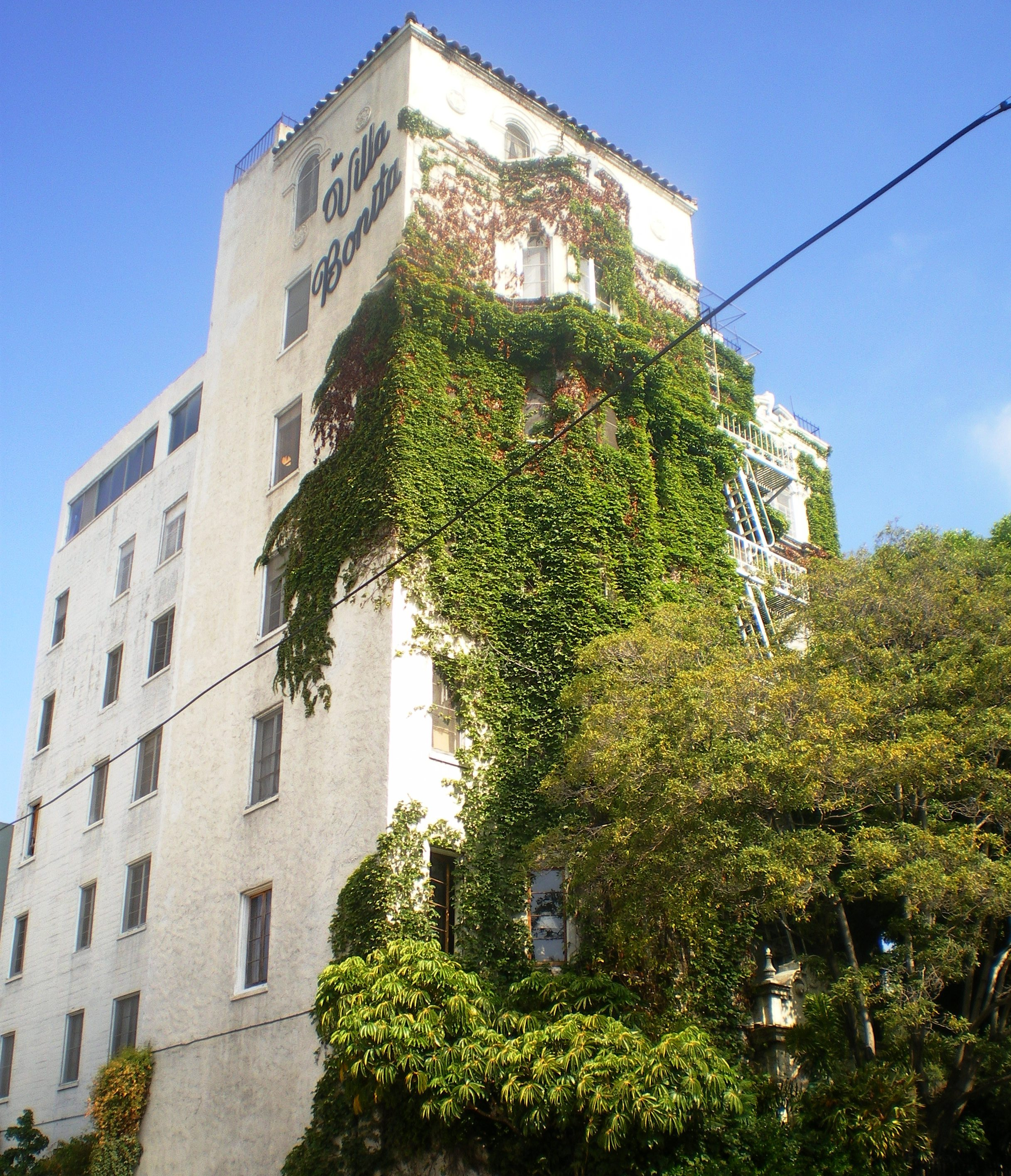
- Villa Bonita, May 2008

- Location within the Los Angeles metropolitan area Location within California Location within the United States
- Location: 1817 Hillcrest Rd., Hollywood, Los Angeles, California
- Coordinates: 34°6′17″N 118°20′19″W
- Built: 1929
- Architect: Frank Webster
- NRHP reference No.: 86001950
- LAHCM No.: 956

Significant dates
- Added to NRHP: September 12, 1986
- Designated LAHCM: 2009-05-20

Villa Bonita is an historic apartment building on Hillcrest Road in Hollywood, California. The building is located a short walk from the corner of Hollywood Boulevard and Highland Avenue, just north of Franklin Avenue and west of Highland. It was added to the National Register of Historic Places in 1986 based on its architecture.

Designed by local architect Frank Webster in 1929, the building's owner was Sidney Ullman. Like many in the film industry, Ullman used his profits to invest in real estate. This tremendous source of capital enabled Hollywood builders to exercise their creativity without regard to cost, as each builder tried to outdo the others. Local architect Frank Webster designed this building, which was built at a cost of $75,000 in May 1929.

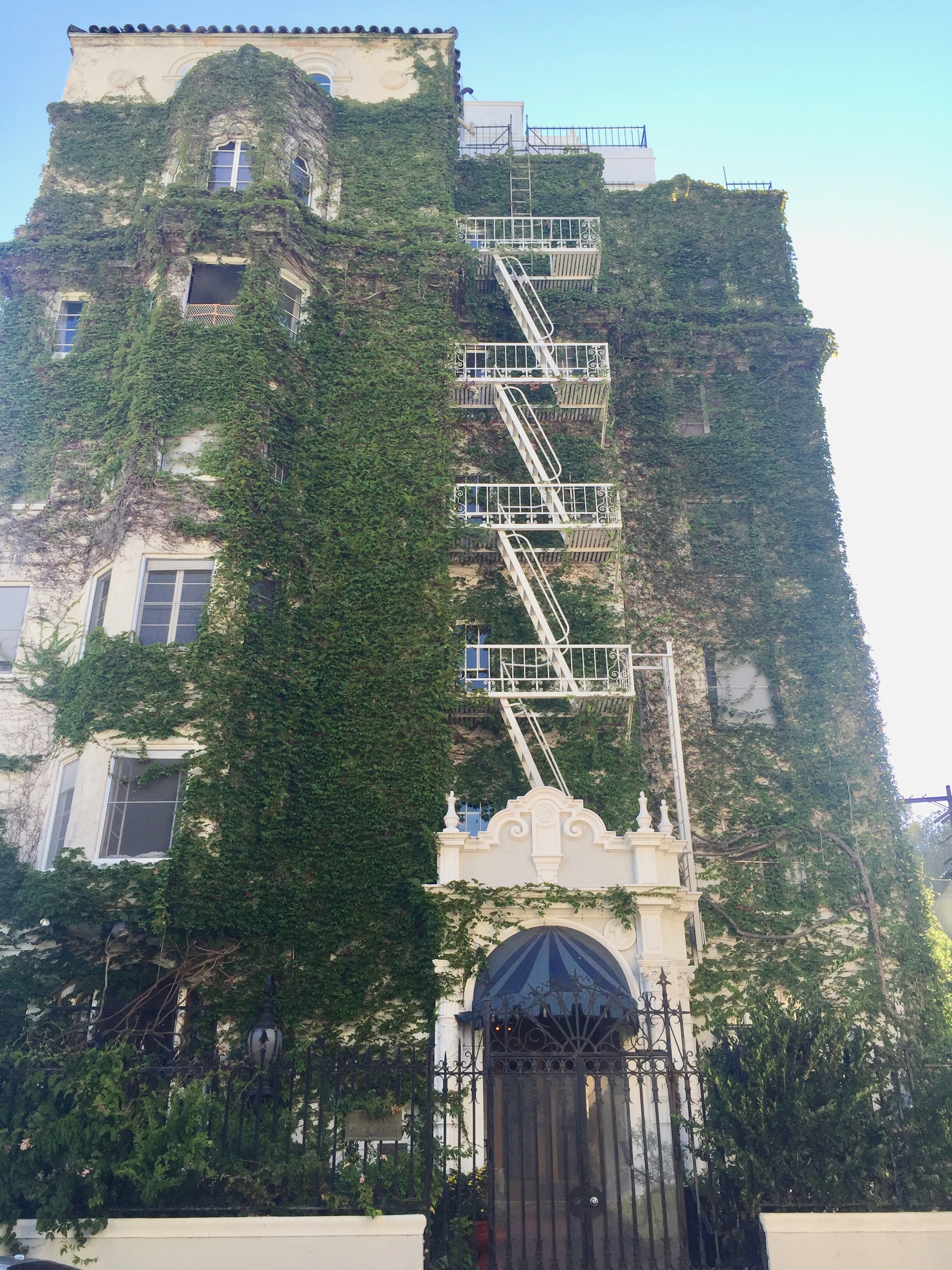

Villa Bonita is a seven-story residential apartment building exhibiting character-defining features of the Spanish Colonial Revival style. Alterations include the addition of a penthouse and a metal roof sign in the early 1930s and addition of a sunroom in 1989. The quality of detailing throughout the structure is remarkable for a building of its size, making it a prime representative example of multi-unit housing in Hollywood during its prime period of significance.

The seven-floor building was originally built for the cast and crew of director Cecil B. DeMille. Since then, it has housed the likes of Errol Flynn and Francis Ford Coppola. Although Villa Bonita residents held a variety of jobs, tenants of the building, particularly in the 1930s and 1940s, tended to be employed in the local entertainment industry as artists, singers, musicians, film corporation executives, etc. For example, Ethelind Terry is recorded in the 1939 Los Angeles City Directory as residing in the Villa Bonita. She was an opera and musical comedy actress starring in several productions, including “Sons O’ Guns” at the Carthay Circle Theater in Los Angeles in 1932, and “Rio Rita” on Broadway in New York City. The proximity of Villa Bonita to Hollywood’s core commercial and entertainment district made 1817 Hillcrest Road a desirable address for those working in the local industry.

Architect Frank Webster embraced the turn-of-the-20th-century period revival-style architecture trend with his design for Villa Bonita. Webster lived and worked in the Los Angeles area, completing designs for a variety of buildings in Southern California, including a two-story multifamily residential building located at 2601-11 Beachwood Drive in Hollywood (c. 1926), a three-story hotel in Topanga Canyon (c. 1925), several buildings in Santa Monica, and a five-story hotel and apartment building in San Diego (c. 1925). Due to the lack of scholarship regarding his work, it is difficult both to assess the extent of Webster’s architectural impact on Southern California and whether or not the buildings identified above are extant. The Villa Bonita, however, appears to be among his significant work.

The building has a small lobby with marble floor, ornate moldings and brackets, and original chandelier. Metal mailboxes occupy a portion of the north wall. An original paneled elevator and a central stairway provide access to the upper floors. The building is bisected by an east-west hallway. Each of the 24 apartments contain a dining area, kitchens with breakfast nooks, and baths. Interiors are largely intact, featuring casement windows; entry has original cabinetry and hardware. A low wall surmounted by an ornamental iron fence encloses a small landscaped courtyard at the front of the building. No other features are present within the boundaries.

Other tenants: Emma Dunn, Carl Held (apt. 51), Lois Collier and film director Walter Bacon.

A photography book about the building titled Villa Bonita by photographer Pamela Littky with text from Cameron Crowe was released in 2016.

== See also ==
- List of Registered Historic Places in Los Angeles
- List of Los Angeles Historic-Cultural Monuments in Hollywood
- Hollywood Heights, Los Angeles
