= Hollywood United Methodist Church =

Church in Los Angeles, California

- First United Methodist Church of Hollywood
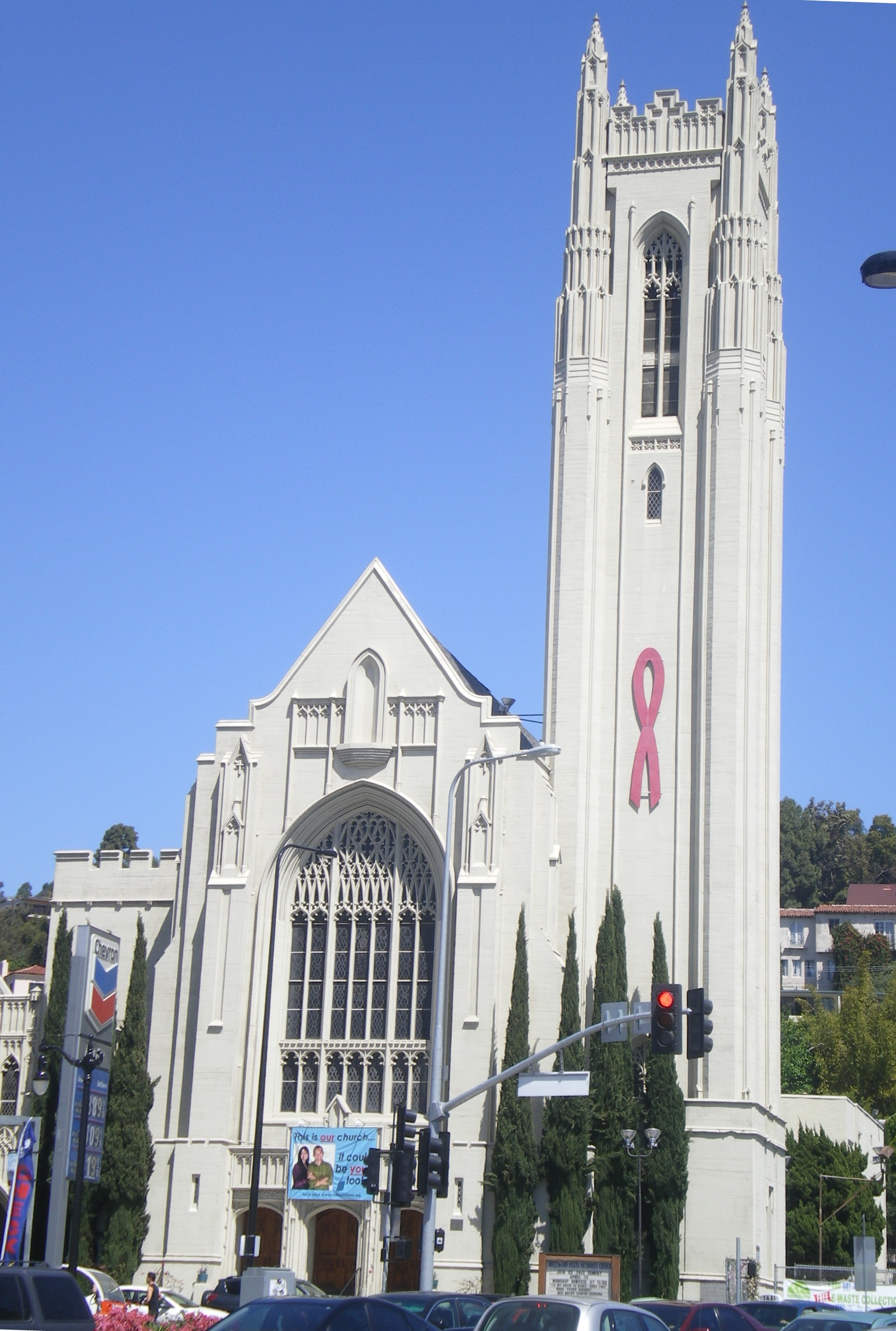
- Hollywood United Methodist Church
- 34°06′16″N 118°20′20″W
- Location: 6817 Franklin Ave., Los Angeles, California 90028
- Country: United States
- Denomination: United Methodist Church

History
- Founded: March 16, 1930

Administration
- Division: California Pacific Conference

Clergy
- Pastor: Rev. Mary Scifres

Hollywood United Methodist Church
- Interactive map of Hollywood United Methodist Church

History
- Built: 1927

Site notes
- Architect: Thomas P. Barber
- Architectural style: English Gothic Revival

Los Angeles Historic-Cultural Monument
- Official name: First United Methodist Church of Hollywood
- Designated: December 4, 1981
- Reference no.: 248

Hollywood United Methodist Church is a United Methodist church located at the intersection of Franklin Avenue and Highland Avenue in the Hollywood Heights neighborhood of Los Angeles, California. Its English Gothic architecture and the giant HIV/AIDS Red Ribbon on the belltower have made it a prominent landmark in Hollywood. The church's facilities, in addition to housing an active congregation, are used by the private nonreligious Oaks School and have been the settings for many movies including Sister Act and Back to the Future.

== History ==
In 1909, a little group from a Los Angeles Methodist congregation began organizing a new church by renting a space above the Owl Drugstore on a street known as Prospect Street. In 1910, this street was renamed Hollywood Blvd. The original building still stands today on the southeast corner of Wilcox and Hollywood Blvd.

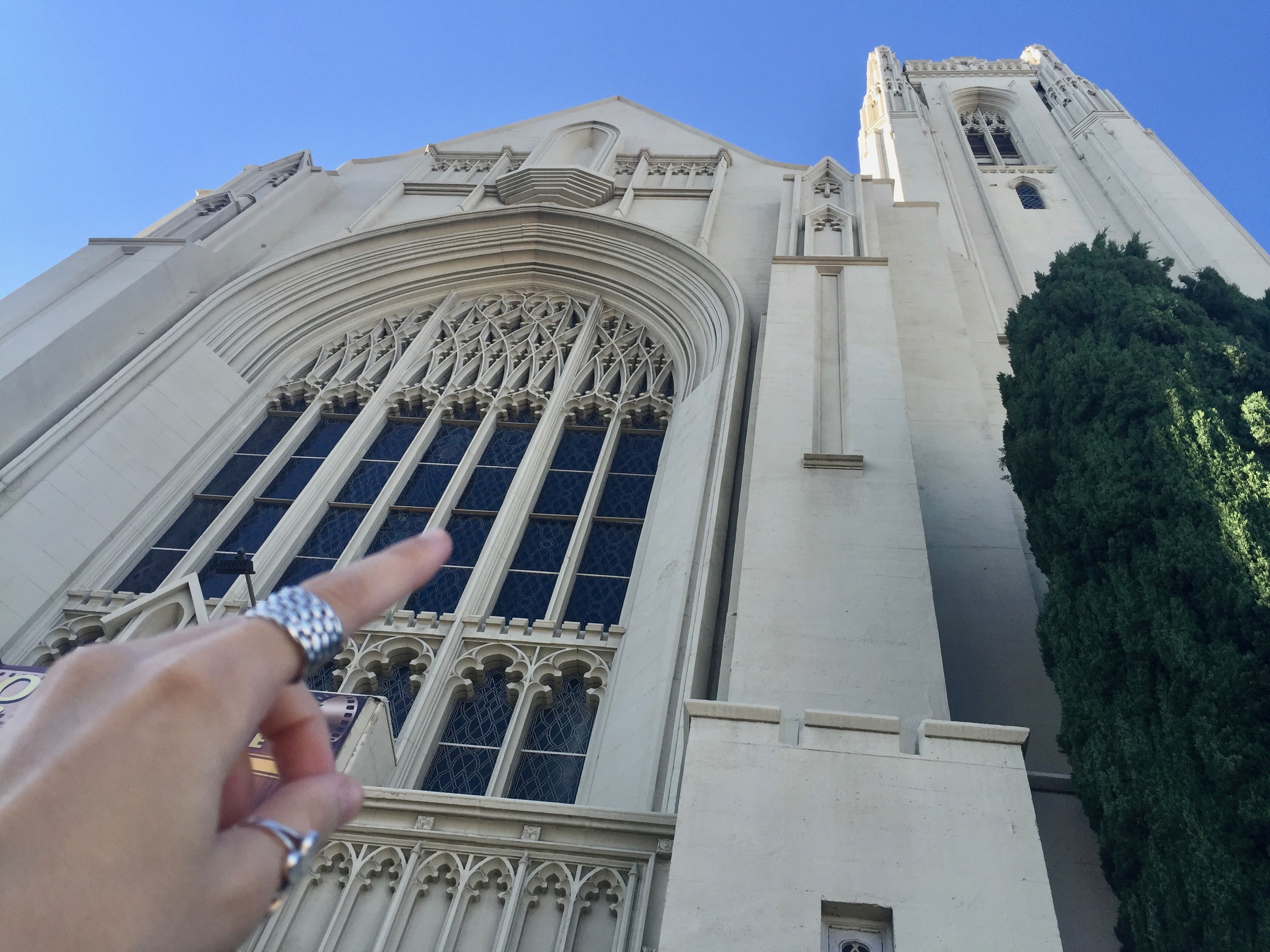
Front of church.

The First Methodist Episcopal Church of Hollywood was built in 1911 on the northeast corner of Hollywood Blvd and Ivar. It was designed by H. W. Wood and built in the Mission Revival style for a cost $35,000, but due to its limited seating capacity of 800 it was demolished in the early 1920s and replaced by the Guaranty Building in 1923 which still stands today.

The congregation bought a new plot of land at the corner of Franklin Ave and Highland Ave, and construction began on the Recreational Hall and Gymnasium in the early 1920's. Then the Education and Administrative wing was built, and in 1927 construction began on the iconic gothic styled sanctuary, designed by Thomas P. Barber. The $800,000 structure was opened on March 16, 1930 and dedicated later that year.

The building was adopted as Los Angeles Historic-Cultural Monument #248 in 1981.

The church erected a large red ribbon on its bell tower in 1993 in honor of World AIDS day. The ribbons were replaced with more permanent versions in 1996, and were repainted in 2004. Since then, the church has been at the forefront of fighting for gay rights within the United Methodist Church, and has attracted a largely LGBT congregation.

== Beliefs ==
=== Marriage ===
The church has an inclusive vision and celebrates both opposite-sex marriages and same-sex marriages.

== Architecture ==
The church building was designed by Thomas P. Barber, and based in part on the English Gothic style of Westminster Hall in London. The structure is steel-framed concrete, which makes it relatively earthquake resistant, and was realized with the contribution of the Italian structural engineer Francesco (Ciccio) Sabato Ceraldi. The church is also an example of American Gothic architecture with its sanctuary roof having an open hammer beam construction.

== Use as a movie filming location ==
Due to its convenient location near several Hollywood movie studios and its mixture of Gothic and modern architecture, the church has been used frequently as a filming location for Hollywood movies. The "Enchantment Under the Sea" dance scenes in Back to the Future and Back to the Future Part II were filmed in the church's gymnasium, as was the talent show scene in That Thing You Do!. Interior scenes for the movie Sister Act were filmed in the hallways, classrooms, and offices of the church, although the film crew repainted the interior to make it appear much older. Scenes from The War of the Worlds, Anger Management, Big Momma's House, Jarhead, and several other movies were filmed on the premises.

== The Oaks School ==
The Oaks School is an independent private K-6 school founded in 1985 which rents space from the church. The school is non-religious and not affiliated with the church, although the school and church communities do work together frequently and share some staff.

== Gallery ==
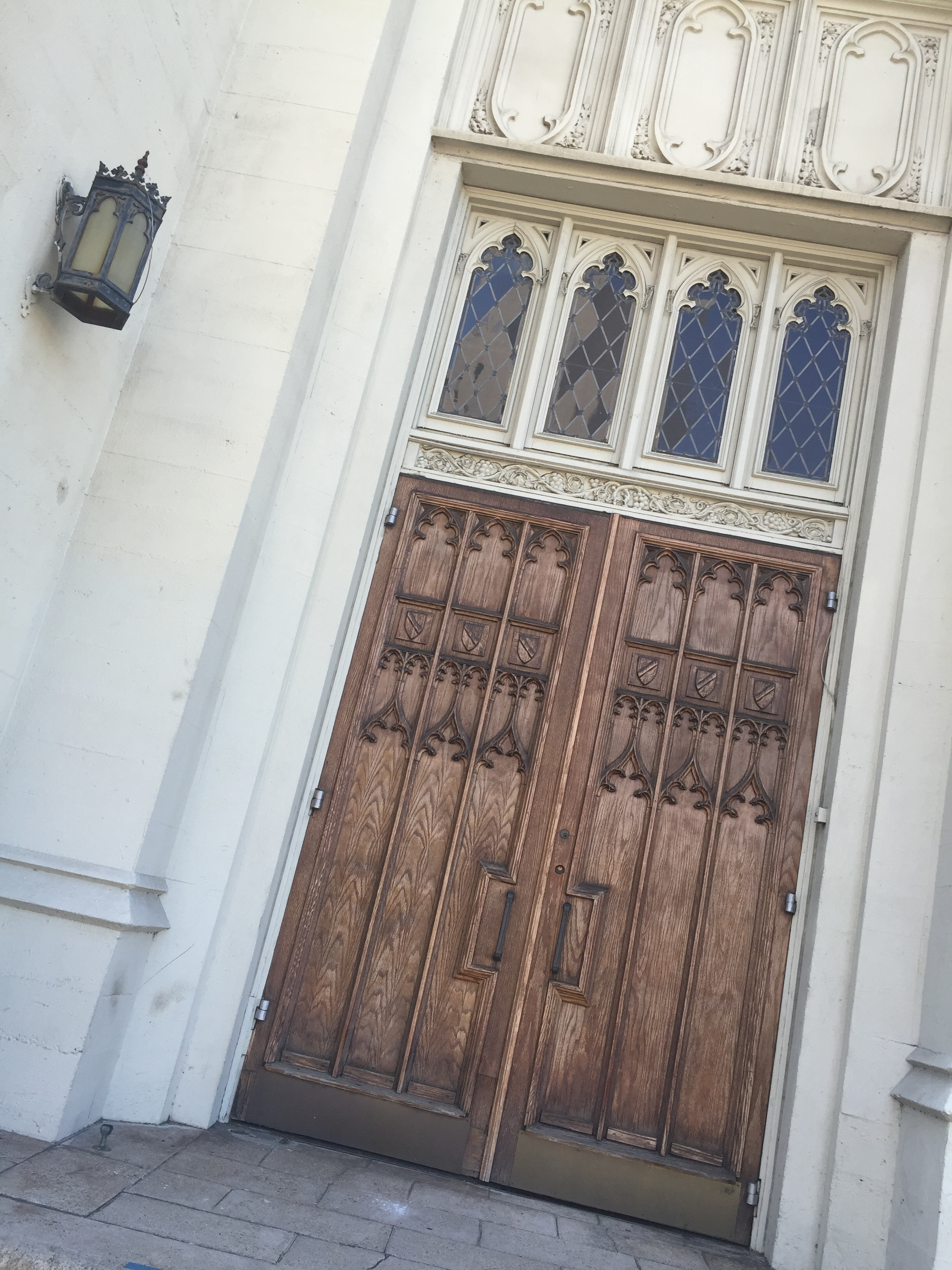

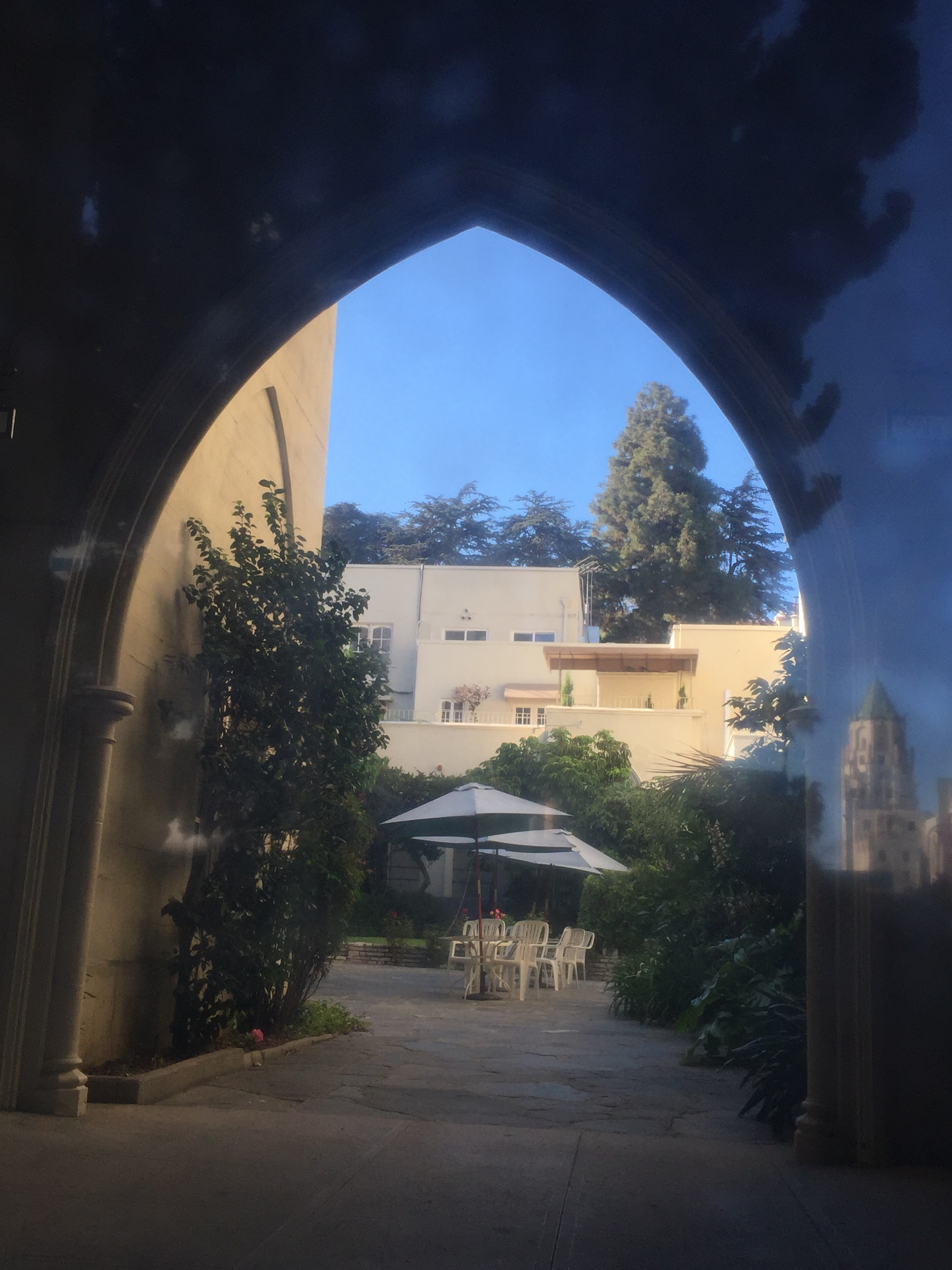

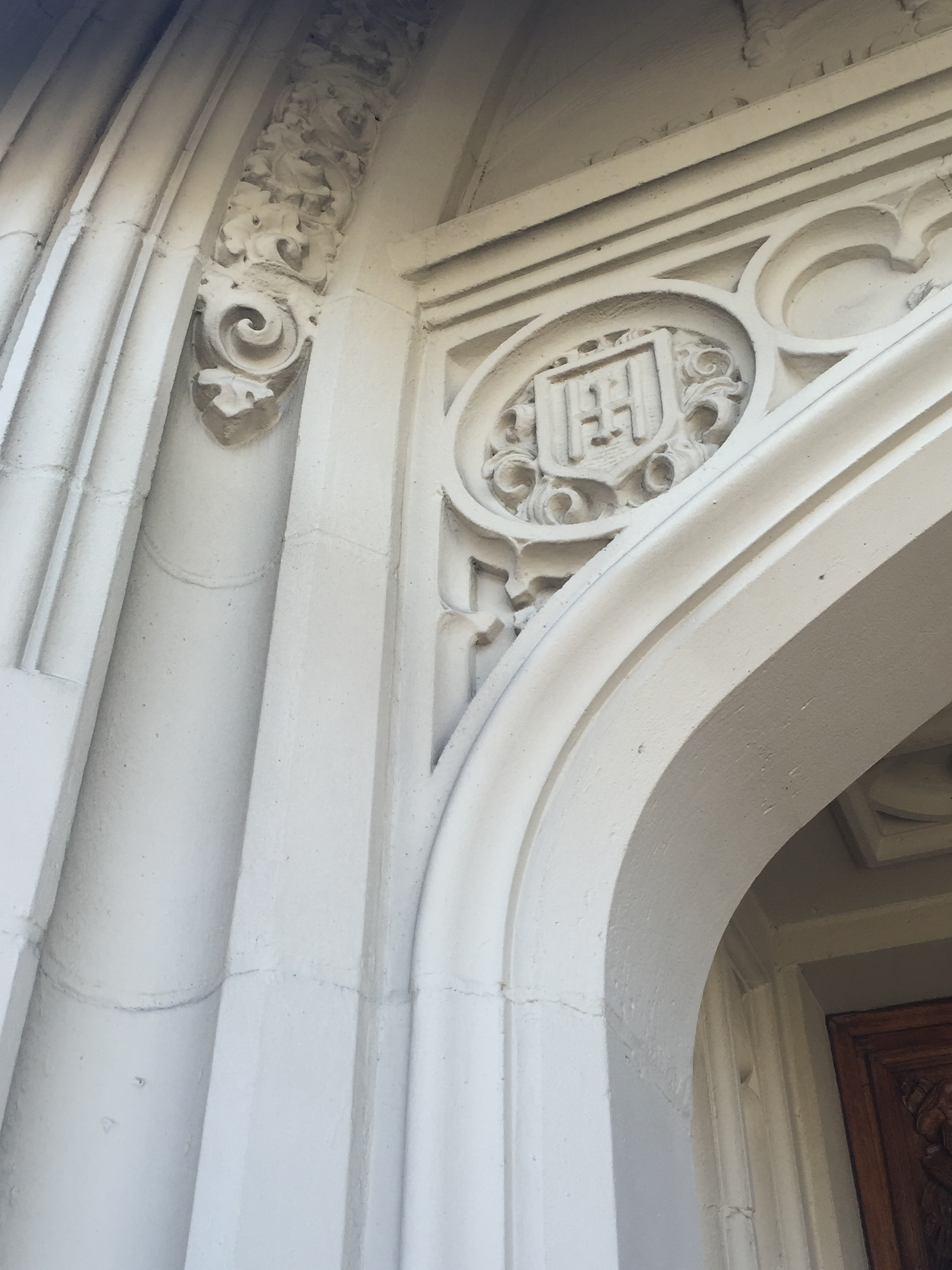

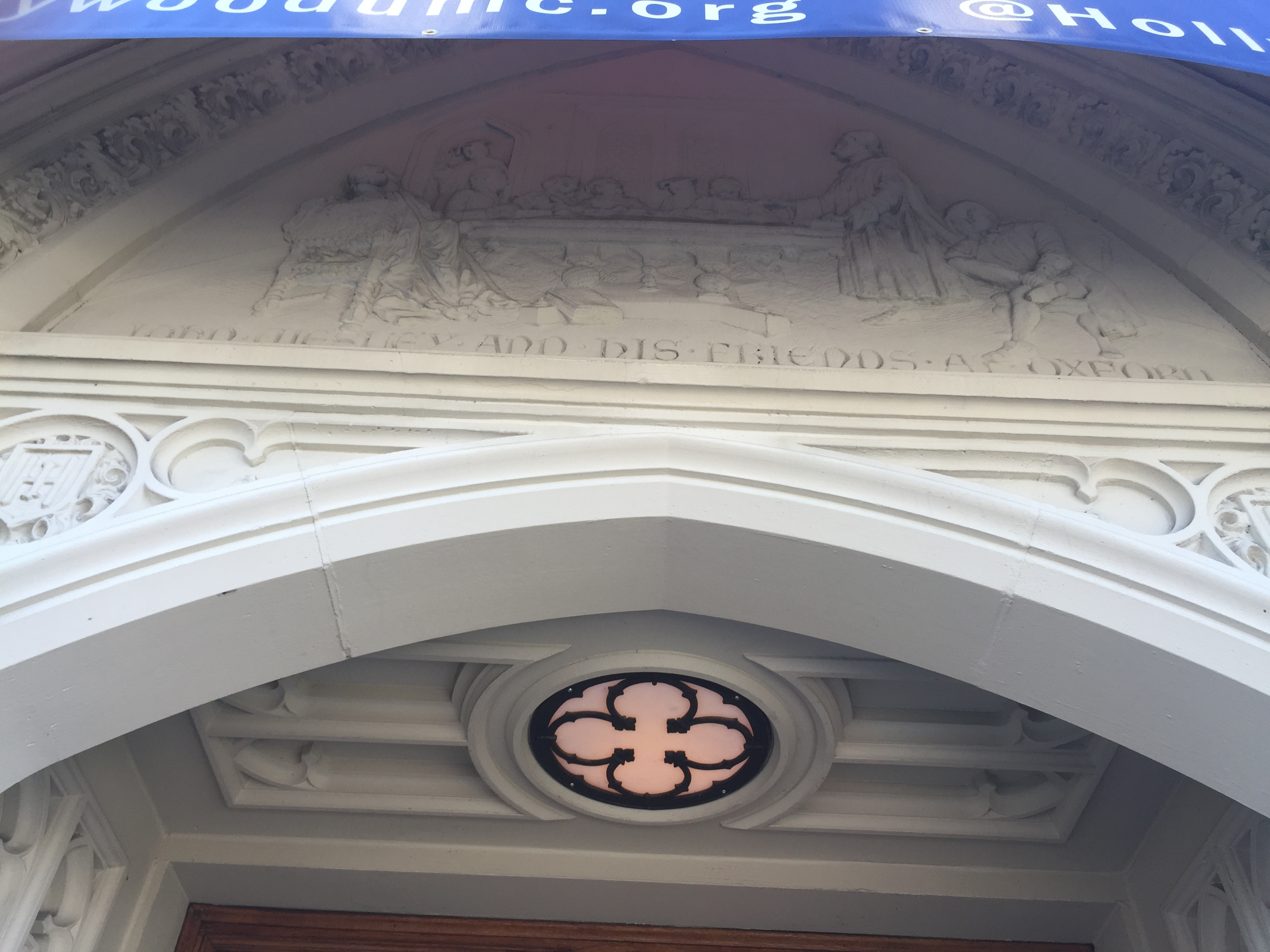

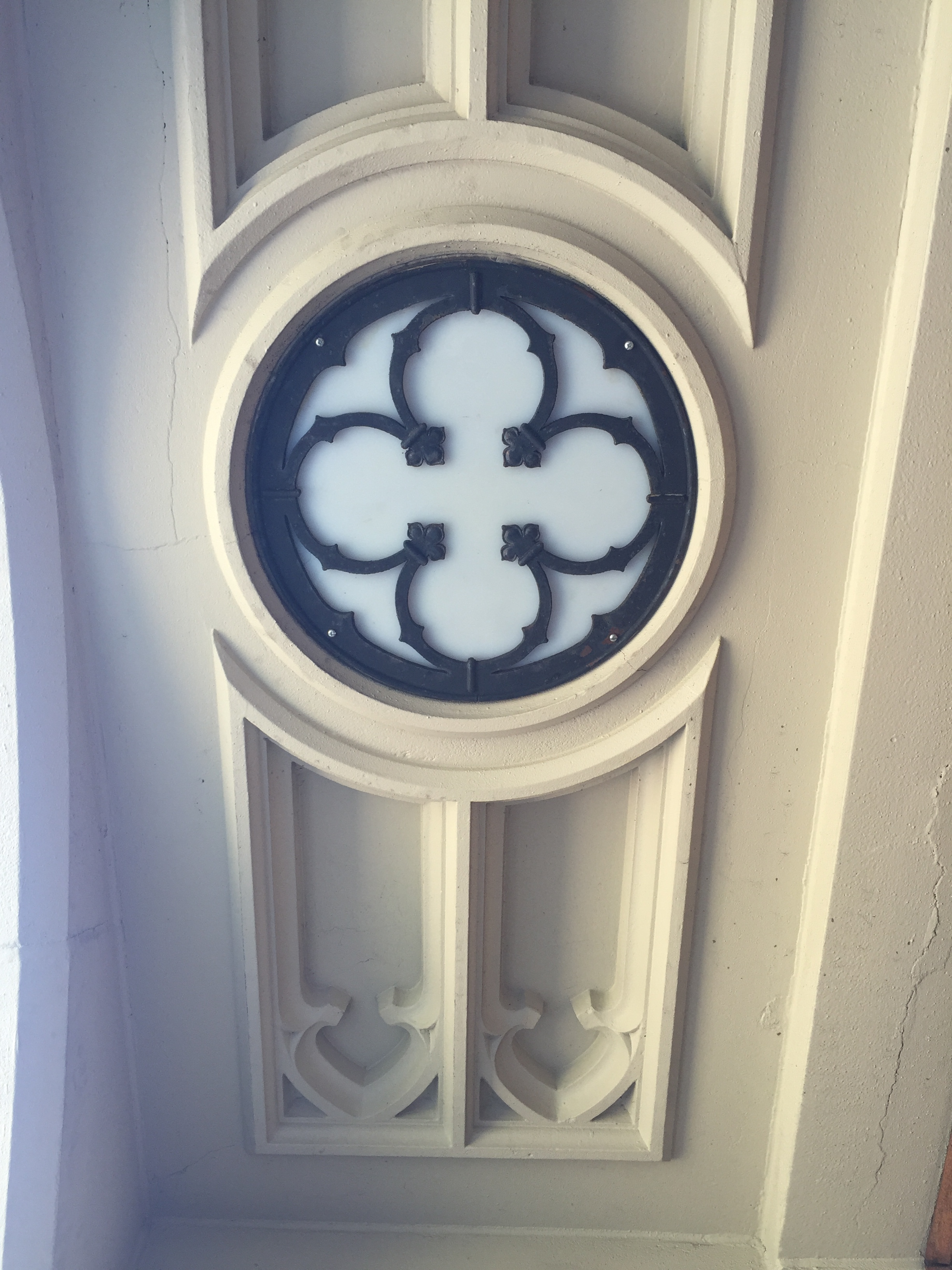

== See also ==
- Los Angeles Historic-Cultural Monuments in Hollywood
- Hollywood Heights, Los Angeles
