= Outpost Estates, Los Angeles =

Neighborhood in California, United States

Coordinates: 34.1078°N 118.3440°W

Outpost Estates is a neighborhood in the Hollywood Hills of Los Angeles, California, consisting of about 450 homes. It is bordered by Mulholland Drive to the north, Franklin Avenue to the south, Runyon Canyon Park to the west, and Hollywood Heights and the Hollywood Bowl to the east.

== History ==
According to Edwin O. Palmer in his 1937 two-volume History of Hollywood, the area identified as Outpost Estates was one of the villages of the Native American Tongva (or Kizh) Nation (named "Gabrielino" by the Spanish after their Mission San Gabriel Arcángel). The Tongva people, who speak a Uto-Aztecan language and are affiliated to the Shoshone people of Western America, have occupied the area for at least 3500 years, and were preceded in the area by Hokan-speaking native people. Based on the 1852 letters of Hugo Reid and other sources, Palmer wrote:

"...the rolling hills, deep canyons, and gentle slopes now called Hollywood, were known by their inhabitants as Cahuegna (little hills). Their chief was Cauegnie. These were later rendered in Spanish "Cahuenga" and "Chief Cahuenga". Their language was called "Kokomear".
"Their Mocohuenga (council grounds) were situated near the mouth of the canyon at the north end of Western Avenue, at Los Feliz. Their principal rancheria (village) at the mouth of the canyon at the north end of Sycamore Avenue, now the Outpost, was called Caueg-na, and was seven miles from Yang-na (now Los Angeles), and about the same distance from Paseg-na, now San Fernando."

— Volume 1, page 16. Palmer wrote many pages describing the lives and culture of the Tongva Kizh people.

The area was the site of the first building in what is now Hollywood, a three-room adobe house built in 1853 by Don Tomas Urquidez, near what is now the intersection of Outpost Drive and Hillside Avenue. General Harrison Grey Otis, the owner of the Los Angeles Times, acquired the estate from Don Tomás through legal wrangling associated with California's joining the United States in 1850. Near Casa Don Tomás, Otis built a clubhouse on the property for entertaining, which he called "The Outpost."

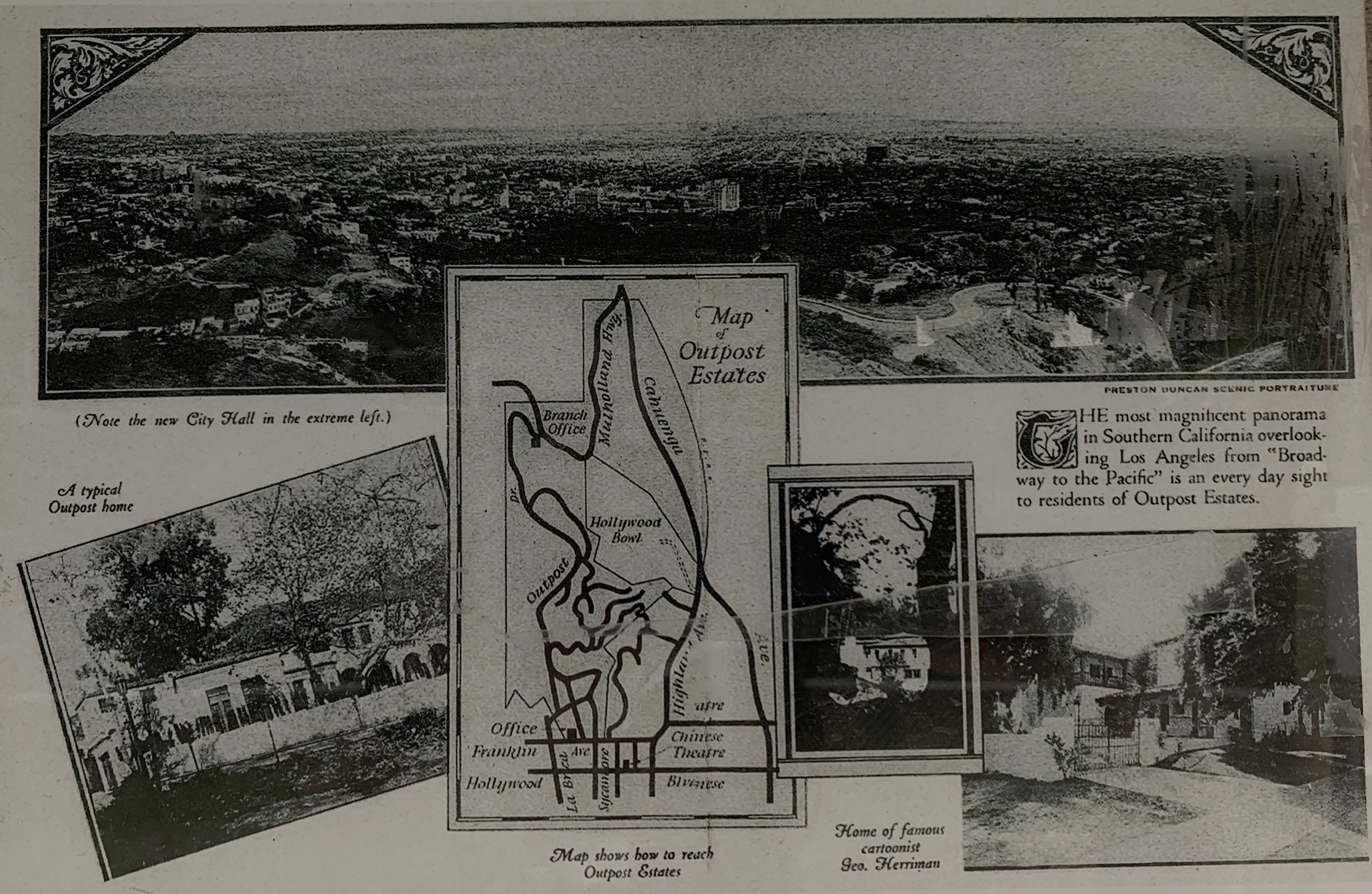
Outpost Estates Brochure

In 1924, Charles E. Toberman acquired the property. He kept the Outpost name and developed the property as one of several 1920s Hollywood luxury residential neighborhoods. The area became known as an affluent area with many rich and famous residents. "Homes had to be designed in Spanish, Mediterranean or California modern style, have red tile roofs, plenty of patios for "outdoor living," and be approved by architectural committee before being built." Most of the original houses have been preserved, and Lower Outpost looks much like it did in the 1920s.

In the 1920s, in the hills above the development, a large sign spelled out "Outpost" in red neon letters 30 feet high. It was intended to compete with the Hollywoodland sign, (which later became the Hollywood sign). At the time, it was the largest neon sign in the United States. The Outpost sign was dismantled during World War II, and the wreckage of the sign was left in place, buried in the weeds. Even the original foundation and electrical junction boxes survived. The twisted remains were identified by hikers in 2002.

In 1967, a homeowners association was formed to combat what residents considered to be inappropriate development. In the 1980s, the group helped to prevent the development of Runyon Canyon.

The Outpost Estates development was one of the first neighborhoods in the country to offer all-underground utilities.

The neighborhood is featured in Episode 14018 of California's Gold with Huell Howser.

== Education ==
Residents are zoned to three elementary schools, depending upon address: Gardner Street Elementary School, Selma Elementary School, and Valley View Elementary School. All residents are zoned to Bancroft Middle School and Hollywood High School.
