= Colorado Springs Independent =

Colorado newspaper

- The paper's March 20, 2008 front page
- Type: Alternative newspaper
- Format: Compact
- Owner: Colorado Media Group
- Founder(s): John Weiss and Kathryn Carpenter Eastburn
- Publisher: Fran Zankowski
- Editor: Ben Trollinger
- Managing editor: Andrew Rogers
- Founded: 1993
- Ceased publication: December 27, 2023
- Relaunched: May 16, 2024
- Headquarters: 235 S. Nevada Ave. Colorado Springs, CO 80903; United States
- Circulation: 36,000
- Website: csindy.com

The Colorado Springs Independent (commonly referred to as The Independent or simply The Indy) is a biweekly alternative newspaper in Colorado Springs, Colorado. The paper was first published in 1993, ceased in 2023, relaunched in 2024, ceased again in 2025 to be revived again at a later date.

== History ==
The Independent was founded in late 1993 by John Weiss and Kathryn Carpenter Eastburn. The pair started the paper to provide "...informative, entertaining and thought provoking..." articles. The paper was initially available on Wednesdays locally and was also featured as a supplement to the Thursday edition of the Denver Post. Later changed to Thursdays, the paper eventually reverted back to a Wednesday release date, and could still be home delivered along with the Sunday Denver Post, and still includes local news, opinions, and food, film, music, and culture articles.

The newspaper was privately owned by co-founder John Weiss under the name Colorado Publishing House. In October 2022, the cooperation dissolved and all of its assets were transferred to a newly created nonprofit called Sixty35 Media. In December 2022, it was announced the Colorado Springs Business Journal would merge with the Colorado Springs Independent and Pikes Peak Bulletin into a new publication called Sixty35 News Magazine.I n March 2023, the publication laid off half its staff and changed its name back to Colorado Springs Independent. The rebranding effort left the paper nearly $400,000 in debt, which it was unable to cover.

On December 20, 2023, publisher Fran Zankowski announced the Colorado Springs Independent's last issue would be published on Dec. 27, citing a lack of funds to pay staff in January. The entire 14-person staff was laid off. Zankowski said he hoped the publication would resume in February. But come February Citizen-Powered Media, the nonprofit that owned the paper, ceased all operations and liquidated or donated all physical assets. The company’s intellectual-property was acquired by Zankowski, including names, websites and social media accounts.

Also in February 2024, Zankowski sold the rights to publish the Colorado Springs Independent and Colorado Springs Business Journal to business partners J.W. Roth and Kevin O’Neil. The two new owners created a for-profit business called Pikes Peak Media Company to produce the papers. The plan was to print twice a month, with 20,000 copies mailed directly to area residents and another 10,000 copies free to pick up at businesses. Zankowski was hired as publisher. The paper officially relaunched on May 16, 2024. Fourteen months later, the new owners laid off all staff and sold the Independent to Dirk R. Hobbs and Colorado Media Group. He planned to relaunch the Independent and fold the Business Journal into Southern Colorado Business Forum & Digest.

== Best of Colorado Springs ==
Annually The Independent publishes the results of a readers poll on a variety of businesses, people and activities in the Pikes Peak region. The results cover food and drink in one issue with a follow-up of services and attractions the following issue.

== Indy Music Awards ==
In 2011 The Colorado Springs Independent started the Indy Music Awards as a way to help put Colorado Springs on the map for its local musicians. Independent readers voted for their favorite local artists in more than a dozen musical categories. Winners were profiled in the Local Music Issue and subsequently performed at the inaugural Indy Music Awards Festival.

In 2012 it was brought back, but on a larger scale. For 2012 new categories were added to the awards, as well as having a larger winner's showcase at Stargazers theater in Colorado Springs.

== Location ==
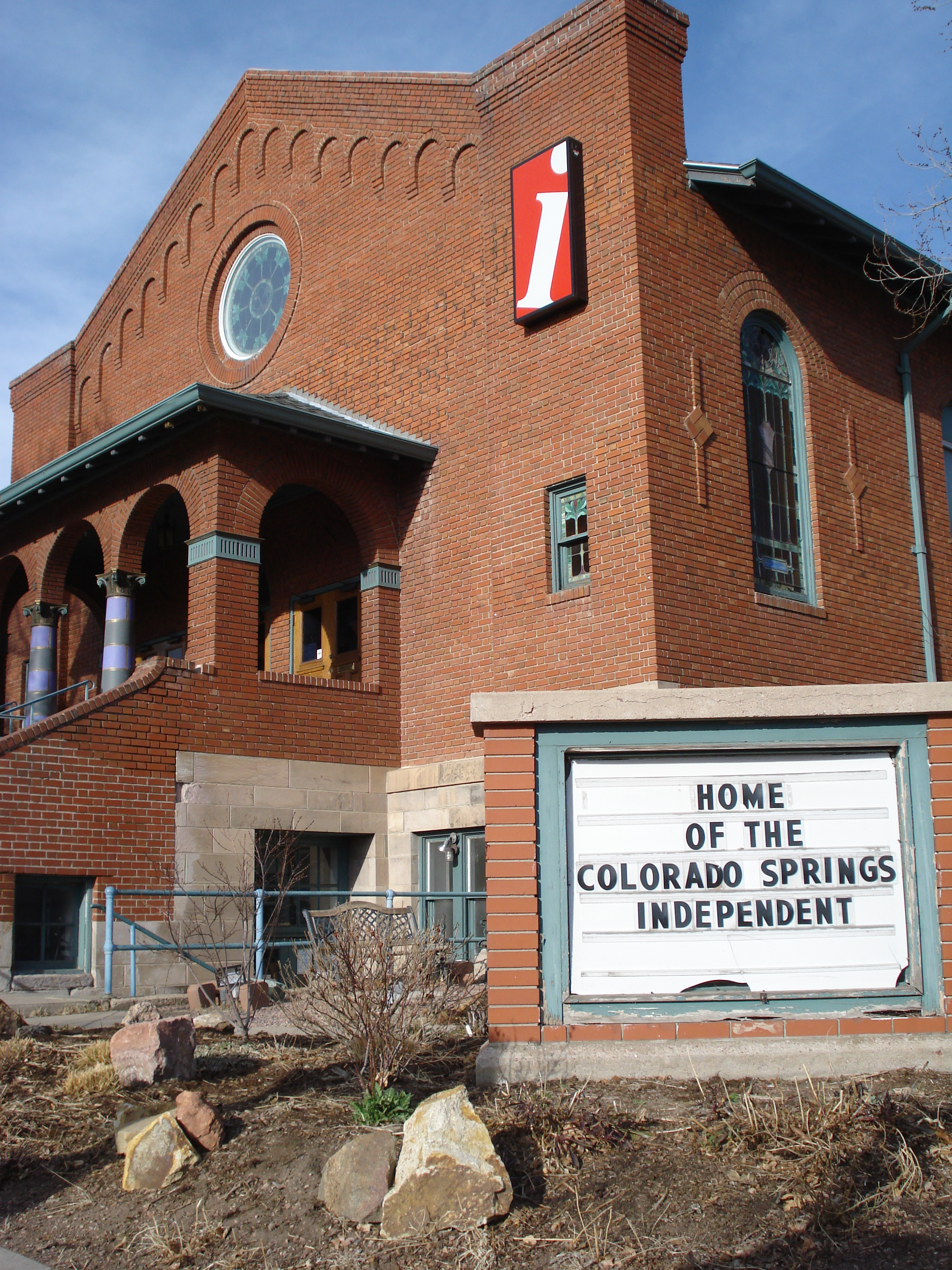
The Colorado Springs Independent building

The Independent's location on 235 S. Nevada is a historic building in downtown Colorado Springs, the old United Brethren Church built starting in 1912 and finished in 1917. The long building time was a result of fundraising problems as well as World War I. It was designed by architect Thomas MacLaren and is built in the Romanesque Revival style. The basement of the building was initially the home of the Tourist Memorial Church in 1912 and when the upper levels were completed in 1917 it was renamed to the United Brethren Church as can be seen on the cornerstone of the building. The building was added on during the 1950s and 1960s then again recently before being purchased by The Independent.

== Starbucks controversy ==
In December 2007 the Starbucks coffee chain, after a single complaint from a customer suggesting The Independent was trashy or lewd, discontinued distribution of the paper in their stores. This ban was challenged by Independent publisher John Weiss, but the chain responded that it has a non-solicitation policy, and that it only carries The New York Times and the Colorado Springs Gazette. The Independent published numerous letters to the editor from angry readers, but Starbucks' position remained unchanged. This was similar to a ban by the King Soopers grocery store chain in 1999, but the stores eventually allowed the paper again after repeated complaints to the corporate headquarters by shoppers.

== See also ==
- The Gazette (Colorado Springs) – Newspaper based in Colorado Springs, Colorado, US
