= DeGraff Building =

Historic building in Colorado, US

- U.S. National Register of Historic Places
- Colorado State Register of Historic Properties No. 5EP.608
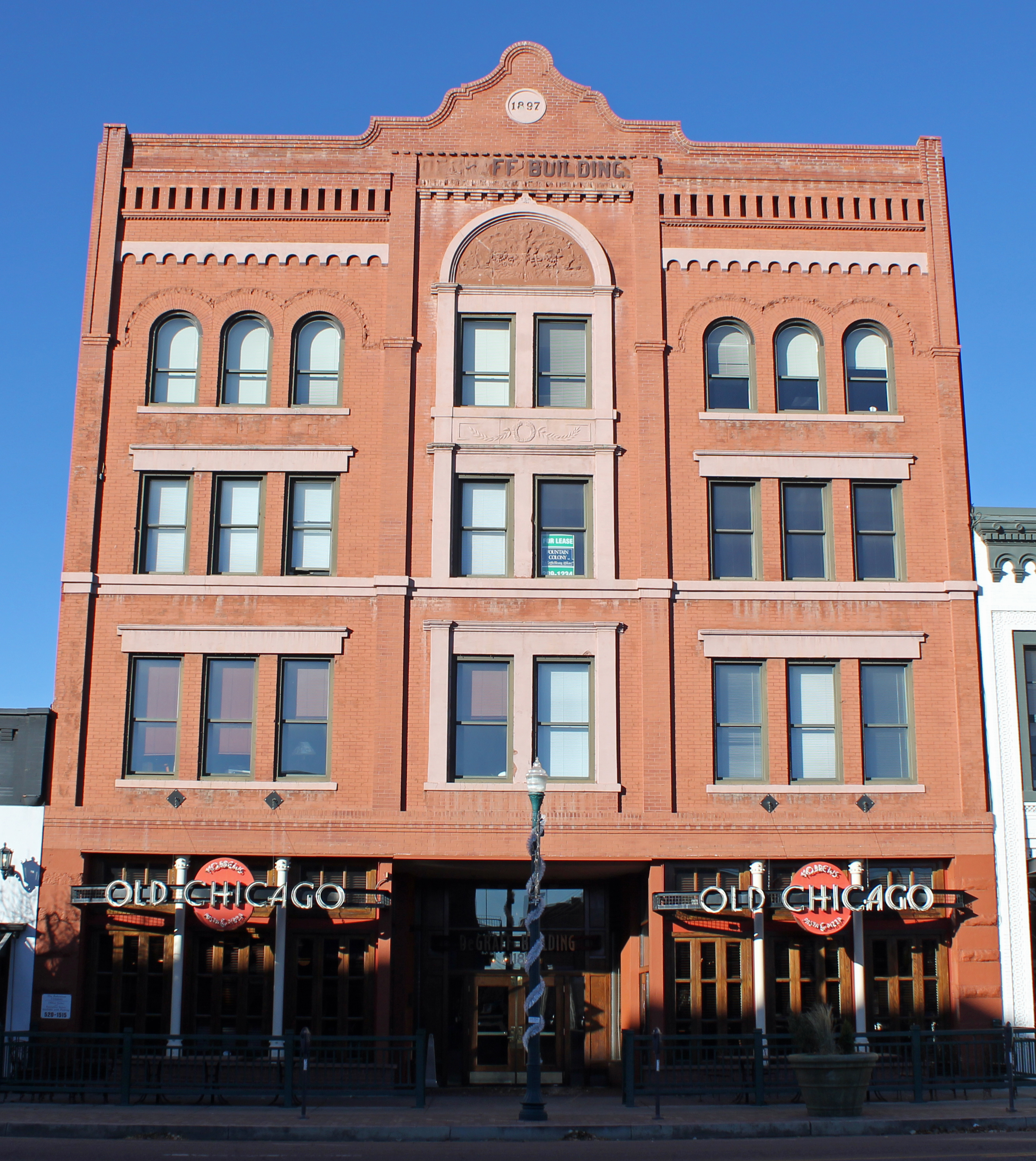

- Location within Colorado Location within the United States
- Location: 116-118 N. Tejon, Colorado Springs, Colorado
- Coordinates: 38°50′10″N 104°49′25″W
- Built: 1897
- Architect: Barber and Hastings
- NRHP reference No.: 83001293
- CSRHP No.: 5EP.608

Significant dates
- Added to NRHP: August 18, 1983
- Designated CSRHP: August 18, 1983

The DeGraff Building is a commercial building in Colorado Springs, Colorado, United States. It is "one of the few remaining commercial buildings dating from the boom period following the Cripple Creek gold strike." The building is on the National Register of Historic Places.

== History ==
David DeGraff, a California gold rush miner, had the building constructed in 1897. It was designed by Barber and Hastings, who also designed the 1890-1891 renovations to the El Paso Club on 30 Platte Avenue. Retail shops were on the first floor of the DeGraff Building and offices were on the second, third and fourth floors. The building was converted into an apartment house after World War II. In 1967 it was converted back to offices. In 1982 the building was restored; the parapet that had been removed was recreated and the rock aggregate veneer that had been applied to the front facade was removed.

The Colorado Springs Business Journal first began in the DeGraff Building in 1989. Oskar blues is currently located on the first floor.

== See also ==
- History of Colorado Springs, Colorado
