= Miriam Matthews =

American librarian and art collector

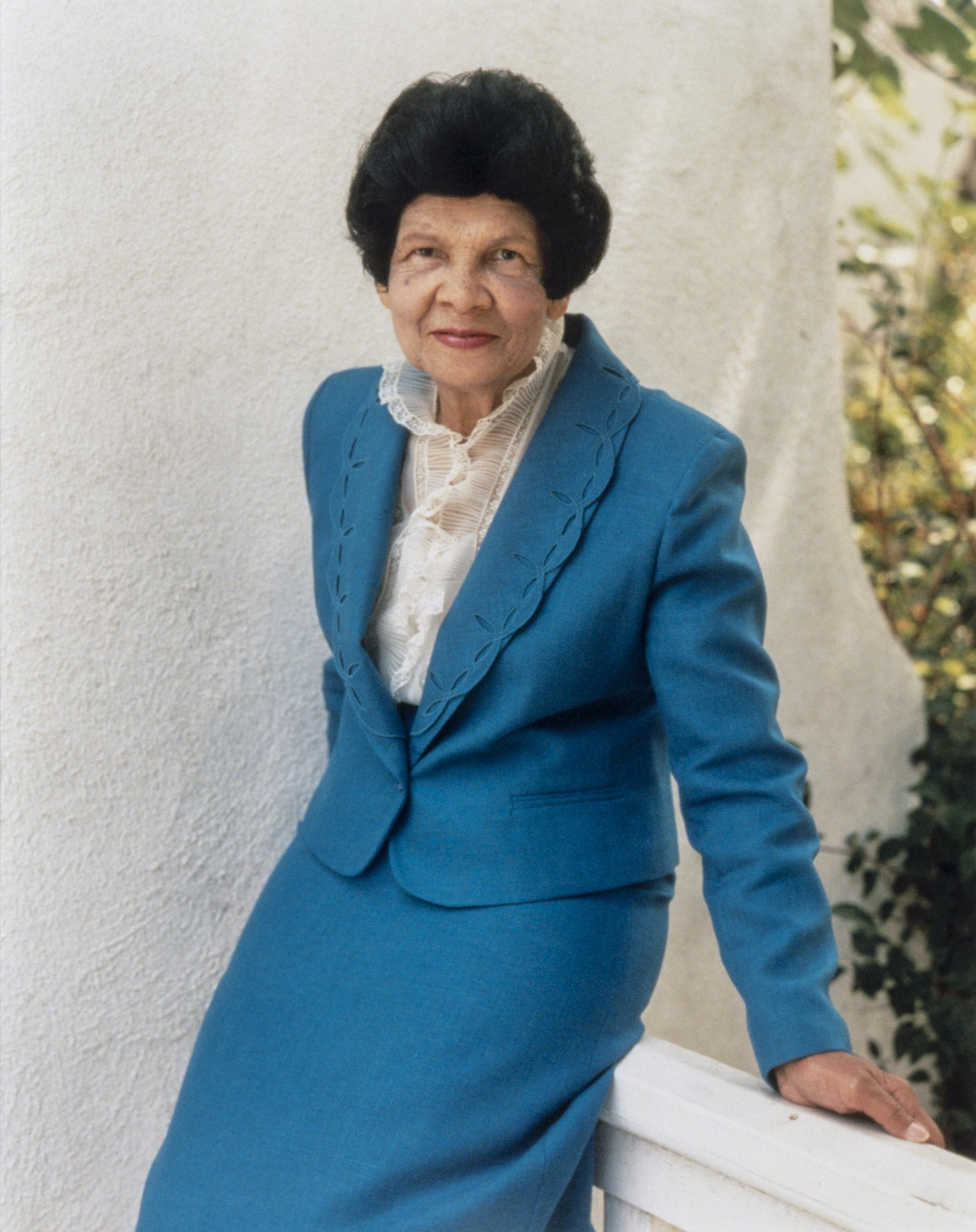
- Miriam Matthews in 1982, photographed by Judith Sedwick
- Born: August 6, 1905; Pensacola, Florida
- Died: June 23, 2003 (aged 97); Mercer Island, Washington
- Occupation: Librarian

Miriam Matthews (August 6, 1905 – June 23, 2003) was an American librarian, advocate for intellectual freedom, historian, and art collector. In 1927, Matthews became the first credentialed African American librarian to be hired by the Los Angeles Public Library.

== Early life ==
Matthews was born in Pensacola, Florida in 1905, the second of three children born to Fannie Elijah and Reuben Hearde Matthews. Her family moved to Los Angeles from the Jim Crow South in search of greater opportunities and freedom from racial segregation when she was two years old. Her father, who was educated at Tuskegee University, established a painting business with his wife as his partner. Matthews graduated high school in 1922, and spent two years at the University of California, Southern Branch (Los Angeles). She subsequently transferred to Berkeley, where she earned her bachelor's degree in 1926 and a certificate in librarianship in 1927.

== Library career ==
After returning to Los Angeles, Matthews sought employment as a librarian in the Los Angeles Public Library. Although she was misinformed about the date of the required Civil Service examination, she learned the correct date and passed the test. Subsequently, she was hired, first as a substitute librarian and three months later as a full-time librarian at LAPL's Robert Louis Stevenson Branch Library. Matthews was a vocal advocate for intellectual freedom and the right to read without censorship. She opposed the banning of controversial works, including Adolf Hitler’s Mein Kampf. Later, while working at the Helen Hunt Jackson branch, Matthews discovered "a small collection of books on the Negro" and began building that into a substantial research collection documenting the contributions made by African Americans to California's history and culture. Matthews rose to the position of branch librarian within 10 years, but felt that her career was stagnating. She took a leave of absence to earn a master's degree in library science from the University of Chicago Graduate Library School in 1945. After she returned to Los Angeles, she was promoted to regional librarian, supervising a dozen branch libraries. After more than three decades of employment, she retired from LAPL in 1960.

== Work on intellectual freedom ==
In 1941, John D. Henderson, President of the California Library Association (CLA), predicted that in the 1940s librarians would experience a "war on books and ideas." In response to this climate, CLA formed a "Committee on Intellectual Freedom to Safeguard the Rights of Library Users to Freedom of Inquiry." At the same time, State Senator Jack Tenney was appointed the chair of a legislative Fact-Finding Committee on Un American Activities in California, which was charged with investigating "all facts ... rendering the people of the State ... less fit physically, mentally, morally, economically, or socially." The Tenney Committee began to investigate any textbooks associated with suspected subversives, such as Carey McWilliams or Langston Hughes. A multi-volume series of textbooks called the Building America Series, which had been used in classrooms for over a decade, came under the scrutiny of Tenney's Committee. Committee member Richard E. Combs argued that the series put "undue emphasis on slums, discrimination, unfair labor practices, ... and a great many other elements that comprise the seedy side of life." Matthews wrote an article detailing CLA's work fighting censorship for the American Library Association's Library Journal in which she argued that, if successful, the Tenney Committee's legislative efforts would "prohibit instruction in controversial subjects."

In the 1940s, Matthews (first as a member and later as Chair of the Committee on Intellectual Freedom), participated in a successful effort to prevent the establishment of a board of censors in the Los Angeles County Public Library. Pressure from the Committee and other library groups, as well as a County Free Library Law assigning responsibility for book selection and library management to the county librarian, forced the Los Angeles County Board of Supervisors to abandon this project.

== Historian and preservationist ==
As part of her commitment to honor African American contributions, Matthews pioneered efforts to establish a "Negro History Week" (now Black History Month) in Los Angeles in 1929; she remained involved in the annual celebration thereafter. Her essay for the California African American Museum was used in support of efforts to rename a Manhattan Beach neighborhood Bruce's Beach, in honor of the African American family that established a resort called Bruce's Lodge in that location in 1912. In the 1920s, city officials began condemnation efforts and the buildings were razed in 1927. She also published a 1944 paper on "The Negro in California: An Annotated Bibliography." When Los Angeles celebrated its centennial in 1981, she was appointed to the Los Angeles Bicentennial Committee's History Team. She helped to document the city's multiracial origins, which resulted in a monument at El Pueblo de Los Angeles State Historic Park listing all of the city's founders (los pobladores) by name, race, sex, and age (26 blacks, 16 indians, and two whites).

Matthews also amassed a collection of approximately 4,600 black-and-white photographs documenting the African American experience in Los Angeles and California, including scenes depicting the founding of the city, African American stagecoach drivers and overland guides to California, and the multiracial californio family of Pio Pico. The collection also includes photographs documenting the arrival of middle class African Americans in Los Angeles between 1890 and 1915, as well as the churches and other organizations they formed during this period and through the 1980s. The collection also includes many photographs taken by black photographer Harry Adams, who chronicled life, politics, community service, and civil rights movement in Los Angeles in the 1960s for the city's black press.

== Art collecting ==
After she retired from LAPL, Matthews also became well known for her collection of works by black artists, including Charles White's I've Known Rivers and Elizabeth Catlett's bronze sculpture, Glory. She loaned art from her collections to institutions such as the Los Angeles County Museum of Natural History, the Long Beach Art Museum, and California African American Museum. She was an active member of the Los Angeles Negro Art Association.

== Later life ==
Matthews was active on numerous groups promoting libraries and black history, as well as other issues. She was named to the California Heritage Preservation Commission, and in 1979 she played a key role in the establishment of an archive program for the city of Los Angeles. In 1996, Matthews moved to Mercer Island, Washington to be near her nephew. She died in 2003.

== Honors ==
In 1982, Matthews was awarded the first annual Titus Alexander Award in recognition of her work documenting the history and achievements of African Americans in California. Later that same year, Matthews was the only southern Californian to be awarded one of nine Awards of Merit from the California Historical Society. The award recognized her distinguished career at the Los Angeles Public Library; her role in the establishment of a permanent archives for the city of Los Angeles; her contributions to the city's Bicentennial celebration; and her long record of service in many organizations such as the California Heritage Preservation Commission and the California State Historical Records Advisory Board. In 2004, as part of the city's $278-million improvement plan, the Hyde Park Branch Library of LAPL was rebuilt and renamed after Matthews. In 2012, she was one of the ten inaugural inductees to the California Library Hall of Fame.
