= Moneta Branch =

- U.S. National Register of Historic Places
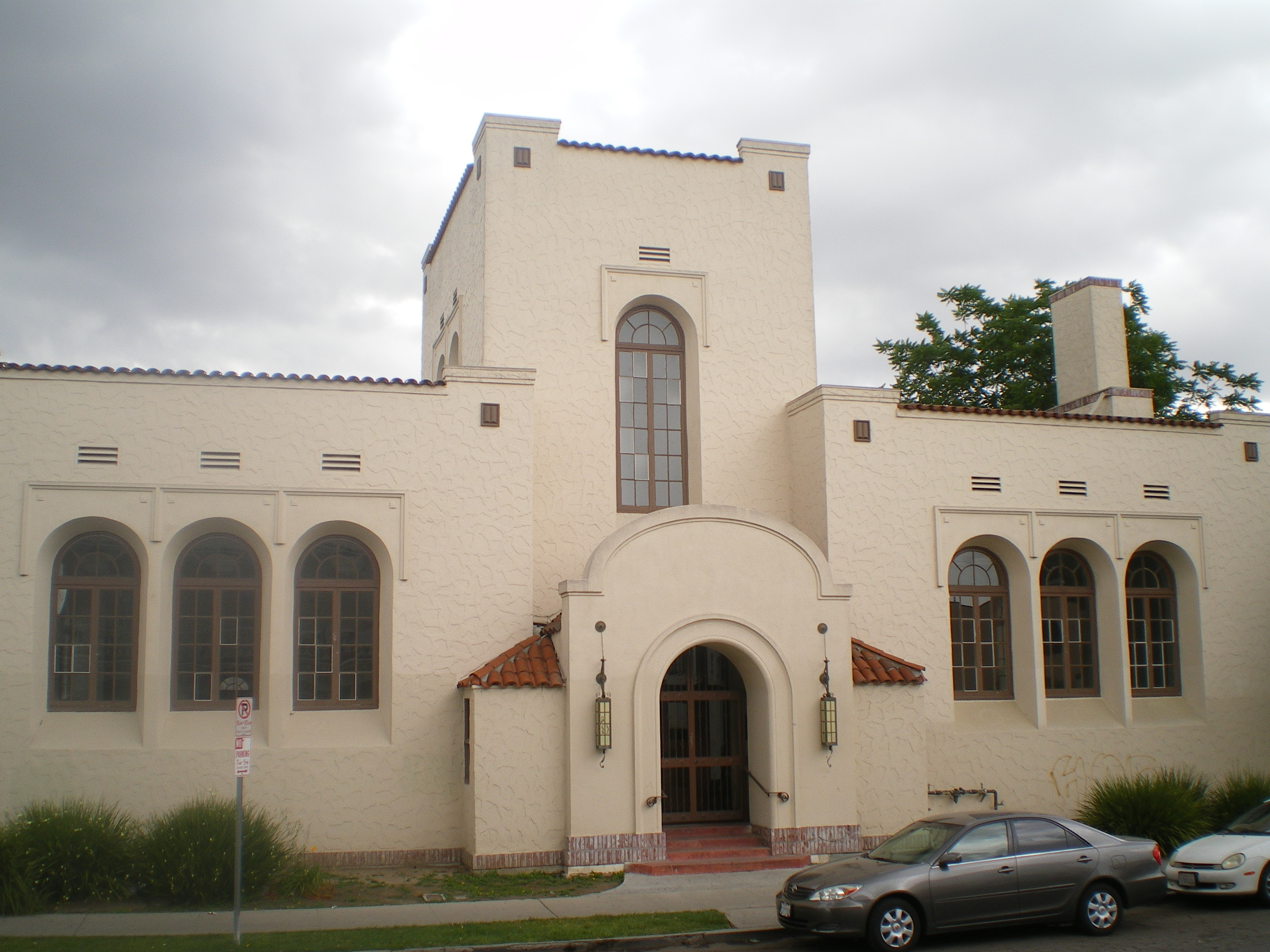
- Moneta Branch Library, May 2008

- Location within the Los Angeles metropolitan area Location within California Location within the United States
- Location: 4255 S. Olive St., Los Angeles, California
- Coordinates: 34°0′21″N 118°16′44″W
- Built: 1923
- Architect: Lyman Farwell
- Architectural style: Mediterranean Revival; Late 19th and 20th Century Revivals
- MPS: Los Angeles Branch Library System
- NRHP reference No.: 87001016
- Added to NRHP: May 19, 1987

Moneta Branch, also known as the Junipero Serra Branch, is a former branch library of the Los Angeles Public Library located south of Downtown Los Angeles.

== History ==
The Moneta Branch was established in 1908 as a book depository located in a store. In 1915, a formal branch library was opened in a rented store building at 249 West 45th Street, near Moneta Avenue, from which it derived its name. During World War I, the Moneta Branch served as a headquarters for Liberty bonds and the Red Cross.

The existing Mediterranean Revival style branch library building was opened in 1923. The name of the branch was changed in 1934 to the Junipero Serra Branch in honor of Junípero Serra, the founder of the California mission system.

=== Designated historic place ===
The Moneta Branch was designated as a Historic-Cultural Monument by the Los Angeles Cultural Heritage Commission in March 1984.

In 1987, the Moneta Branch and several other branch libraries in Los Angeles were added to the National Register of Historic Places as part of a thematic group submission. The application noted Moneta Branch was as a one-story Mediterranean Revival building, constructed of brick with a stucco finish. It is designed with a symmetrical front facade, and its most visible feature is a square, central tower.

=== Closed ===
The Moneta/Serra Branch was closed in 1987 following the Whittier Narrows earthquake, and a temporary replacement branch in a mini-mall on Figueroa Street was burned in the 1992 riots. A permanent replacement library was opened in 1998 at the former site of a tofu plant at Main Street and 46th Street. The new branch was three times larger than the old Serra Branch and includes multimedia computer workstations with access to the Internet. Choreographer Debbie Allen led a campaign to raise $900,000 to buy the books and materials for the Serra branch and the nearby John Muir branch, which was also burned during the riots.

The old 1923 library building on Olive Street has remained closed since the 1987 earthquake.

== See also ==
- List of Registered Historic Places in Los Angeles
