= Vermont Square Branch Library =

- Vermont Square Branch
- U.S. National Register of Historic Places
- Los Angeles Historic-Cultural Monument
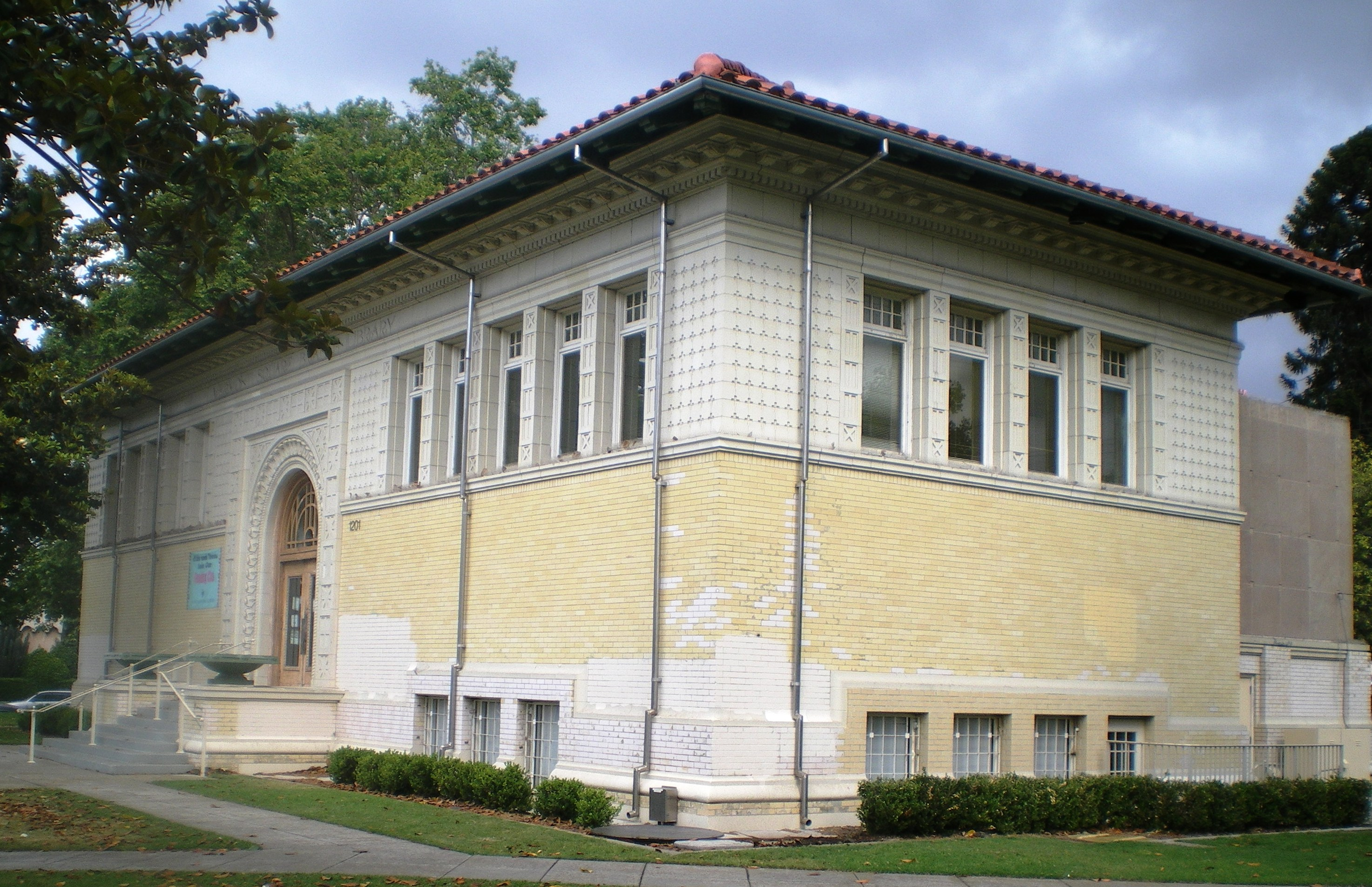
- Vermont Square Branch, May 2008

- Location within the Los Angeles metropolitan area Location within California Location within the United States
- Location: 1201 W. 48th Street, Los Angeles, California
- Coordinates: 33°59′59″N 118°17′42″W
- Built: 1913
- Architect: Sumner Hunt; Silas Reese Burns
- Architectural style: Italian Renaissance Revival, Mediterranean Revival
- MPS: Los Angeles Branch Library System
- NRHP reference No.: 87001022
- LAHCM No.: 264

Significant dates
- Added to NRHP: May 7, 1987
- Designated LAHCM: June 7, 1983

Vermont Square Branch Library is the oldest branch library in the Los Angeles Public Library system. Located about a mile southwest of the University of Southern California campus, in the Vermont Square district, it was built in 1913 with a grant from Andrew Carnegie. One of three surviving Carnegie libraries in Los Angeles, it has been designated a Historic-Cultural Monument and listed on the National Register of Historic Places.

== Architecture and historic designation ==
The Vermont Square Branch was designated as a Historic-Cultural Monument (#264) by the Los Angeles Cultural Heritage Commission in June 1983 as the oldest remaining library in the city system. In 1987, the Lincoln Heights Branch and several other branch libraries in Los Angeles were added to the National Register of Historic Places as part of a thematic group submission. The application noted Vermont Branchwas as "a one-story structure designed in the Italian Renaissance Revival and Mediterranean Revival style with Prairie style proportions." It rests on a raised foundation and is topped by a red tile roof supported by broad overhanging eaves. The symmetrical facade is divided into three sections with the center portion protruding slightly. The center portion is fronted with terra cotta blocks with geometric patterns reminiscent of Classical motifs. The entry is located on a landing midway up the stairs. The top half of the staircase is located inside the building. Both wings are horizontally divided with two different facing materials. Cream-colored glazed brick covers the exterior walls below the window sills. Long vertical windows are arranged high on the walls, grouped in bands of five on either side of the entry.

== History ==
=== Opening in 1913 ===
The Vermont Square Branch opened in March 1913 as the first library building built by the City of Los Angeles. It is the oldest branch library in the city and was the first of six branch libraries built with a $210,000 grant from Andrew Carnegie. When the library opened, the 2,000 new books which were ready for circulation did not come close to filling the shelves that were planned to accommodate 16,000 volumes. A history of the branch's early years describes the opening this way:

On March 1, 1913, the Vermont Square Branch, the first of the Carnegie branch libraries built in Los Angeles, was opened to the public. ... At six o'clock the doors were opened and hundreds of enthusiastic men, women and children crowded in. It had been planned to have the program in the auditorium but since the crowd made this impossible, the speakers sought refuge within the charging desk where they spoke from an improvised platform. ... The newness of the library, furniture and books were a real luxury to us who had been used to the gloomy, rented store buildings but there was one crumpled rose leaf which marred our serenity of spirit. There was no cork carpet on the floors and the noise of the steel tipped chairs on the cement was terrific.

The Los Angeles Times described the opening of the "artistic" new structure as follows:

The handsome building is of fireproof construction, the exterior being cased in cream-colored glazed brick and white tile. The roof is of the genuine Spanish type, constructed of hollow red tile, set off by a heavy frieze of open woodwork under the eaves, to match the coping around the top of the open-air reading room on the northeast corner, both being painted a soft green color in pleasant contrast to the exterior finish. ... Surrounded by a park filled with flowers and shrubbery, the building is an ornament to the well-built neighborhood.

Carnegie paid for a total of six libraries in Los Angeles, and only three of the Carnegie libraries remain: Vermont Square, Cahuenga, and Lincoln Heights."

=== Early years ===
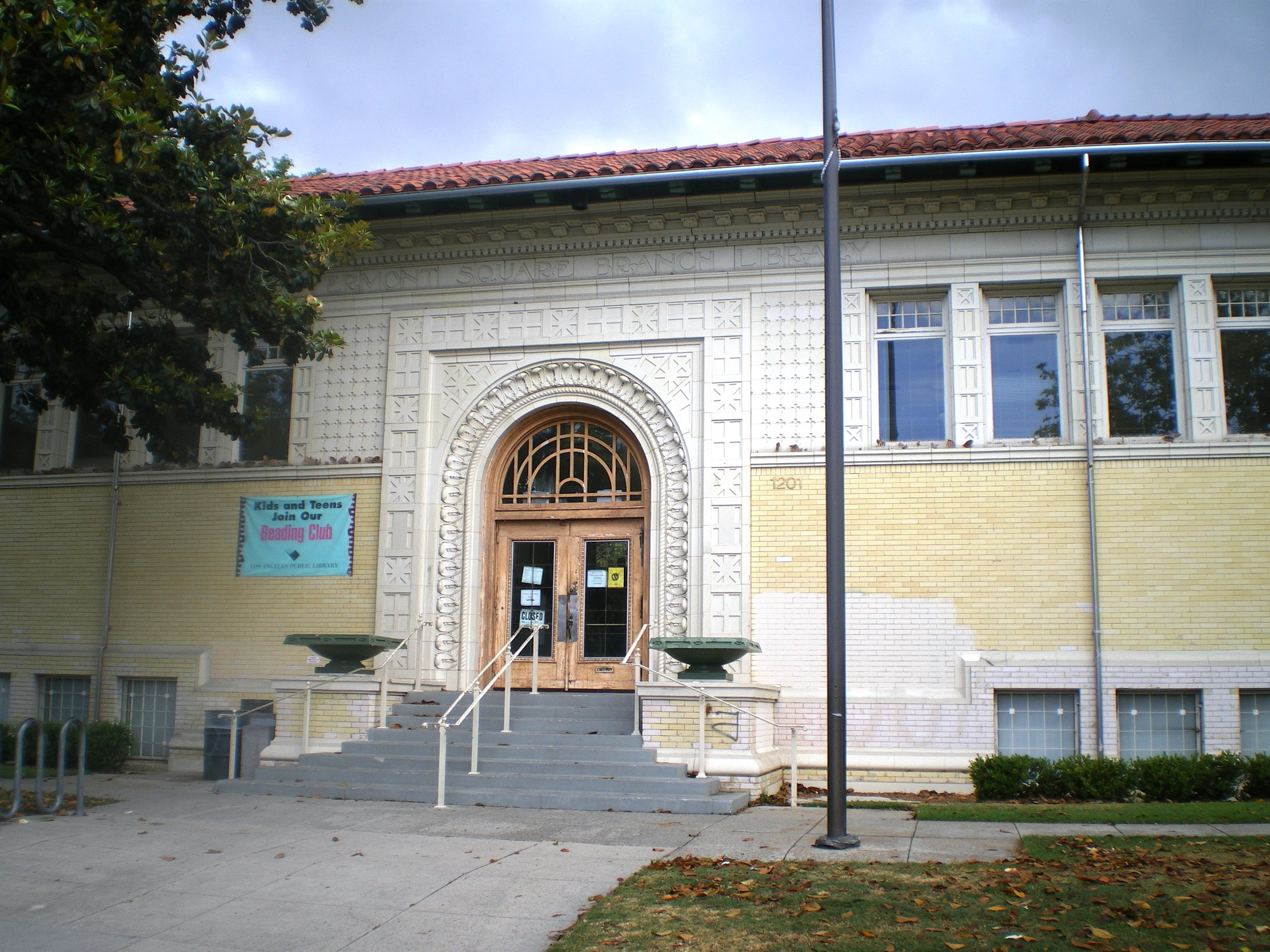
Front view of Vermont Square Branch, 2008

In 1917, the branch received a gift of a "motion picture projection machine" which was used for the first time to show the picture "The Prince and the Pauper" to a full auditorium.

During World War I, the local exemption board conducted its operations at the library, making their headquarters in the story room for 20 months. Thousands of physical examinations were given in the library, and there were stenographers pounding out their reports in the reading room. The building was one of the most widely visited in the southwest section of the city in its early years. During the year 1917–1918, there were 368 meetings in the branch's auditorium. One report stated that "Monday mornings was the only time in the week free for tuning the piano."

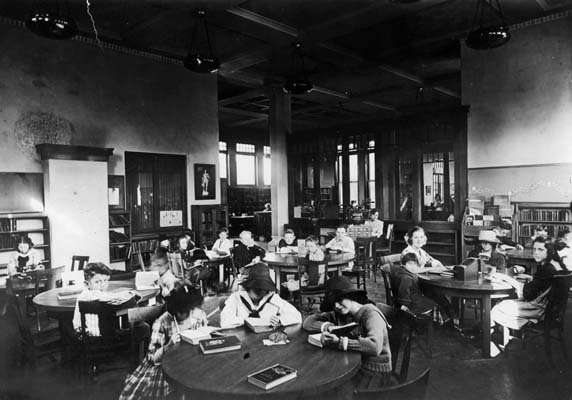
Children's reading room, 1913, photograph from the collection of the Los Angeles Public Library

By 1920, the shelving and seating capacity were taxed by high demand for the library's facilities. In 1928, a gas furnace was installed, eliminated the need for a coal room, and the basement was rearranged to make available more usable space.

During World War II, the branch was designated an air raid shelter and Red Cross casualty center; it was also used by the draft board as a registration center. From 1949 to 1978, the branch was the headquarters for the library's Central Region.

=== 70th anniversary celebration ===
The branch celebrated its 70th anniversary in 1983, bestowing an award on Los Angeles Times columnist Jack Smith, who had been a patron of the library as a boy in the 1920s. In a column paying tribute to the museum where he spent his youth, Smith wrote that he developed his "literary style and attitudes toward life at those low round tables in the children's room." Smith also noted that, in a neighborhood that had deteriorated in the years since he grew up there, "the little square has become all the more an oasis."

The grandsons of the developer who subdivided the area and donated the land for Vermont Square Park wrote a letter to the Los Angeles Times noting the role of the library in their own childhoods: "The books I borrowed enabled me to follow the adventures of Tarzan, fight the battles of the Civil War, attend West Point as a plebe, explore the dark forests of the Belgian Congo in pursuit of that huge, ferocious, man-eating monster, the gorilla, as I then thought it to be."

=== Closure and renovation in the 1990s ===
The branch was closed in May 1990 when it was discovered the building's unreinforced masonry did not meet seismic safety codes. The building was extensively renovated and reopened in May 1996. As part of the renovation, artwork by Nobuho Nagasawa was installed. Nagasawa's artwork consists of functional library furniture, including 11 preschool stools in the shape of letters that spell out the word "IMAGINATION," and a glass table sandblasted with the names of books that have been banned in some of America's public schools.

== See also ==
- List of Los Angeles Historic-Cultural Monuments in South Los Angeles
- List of Registered Historic Places in Los Angeles
- Los Angeles Public Library
