= Center for the Arts Eagle Rock =

- Eagle Rock Branch Library
- U.S. National Register of Historic Places
- Los Angeles Historic-Cultural Monument
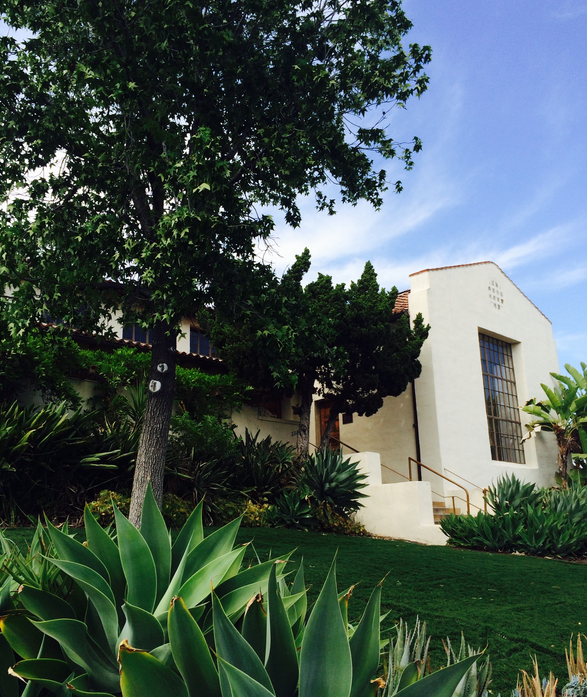
- Center for the Arts Eagle Rock
- Location: 2225 Colorado Blvd, Eagle Rock neighborhood of Los Angeles, CA
- Coordinates: 34°8′22.51″N 118°12′53.69″W
- Built: 1927
- Architects: Henry C. Newton; Robert D. Murray
- Architectural style: Mission Revival-Spanish Colonial Revival
- MPS: Los Angeles Branch Library System
- NRHP reference No.: 87001004
- LAHCM No.: 292

Significant dates
- Added to NRHP: May 19, 1987
- Designated LAHCM: June 18, 1985

Center for the Arts Eagle Rock, formerly known as the Eagle Rock Branch Library and the Eagle Rock Community Cultural Center, is a historic Mission Revival and Spanish Colonial Revival style building in Eagle Rock, in north-central Los Angeles County, California.

== Library ==
The building was built in 1915 as a Carnegie library, named the Eagle Rock Carnegie Library. The city of Eagle Rock was annexed to Los Angeles in 1923. The library was rebuilt in 1927, and became the Eagle Rock Branch Library in the Los Angeles Public Library system. The library was closed in 1981 when a larger, accessible facility opened.

== History ==
In 1997 the Cultural Affairs Department established The Eagle Rock Community Cultural Center (ERCCC) to provide cultural events to the community. The Eagle Rock Community Cultural Association soon began doing business as Center for the Arts Eagle Rock (CFAER), located at the corner of Colorado Boulevard and Rockland, one block west of Eagle Rock Boulevard, in the Eagle Rock district of Los Angeles.

The building was declared a Los Angeles Historic-Cultural Monument on 6/18/1985. It was listed on the National Register of Historic Places as part of a thematic submission in 1987.

== See also ==
- List of Los Angeles Historic-Cultural Monuments on the East and Northeast Sides
