= Lincoln Heights Branch Library =

- Lincoln Heights Branch
- U.S. National Register of Historic Places
- Los Angeles Historic-Cultural Monument
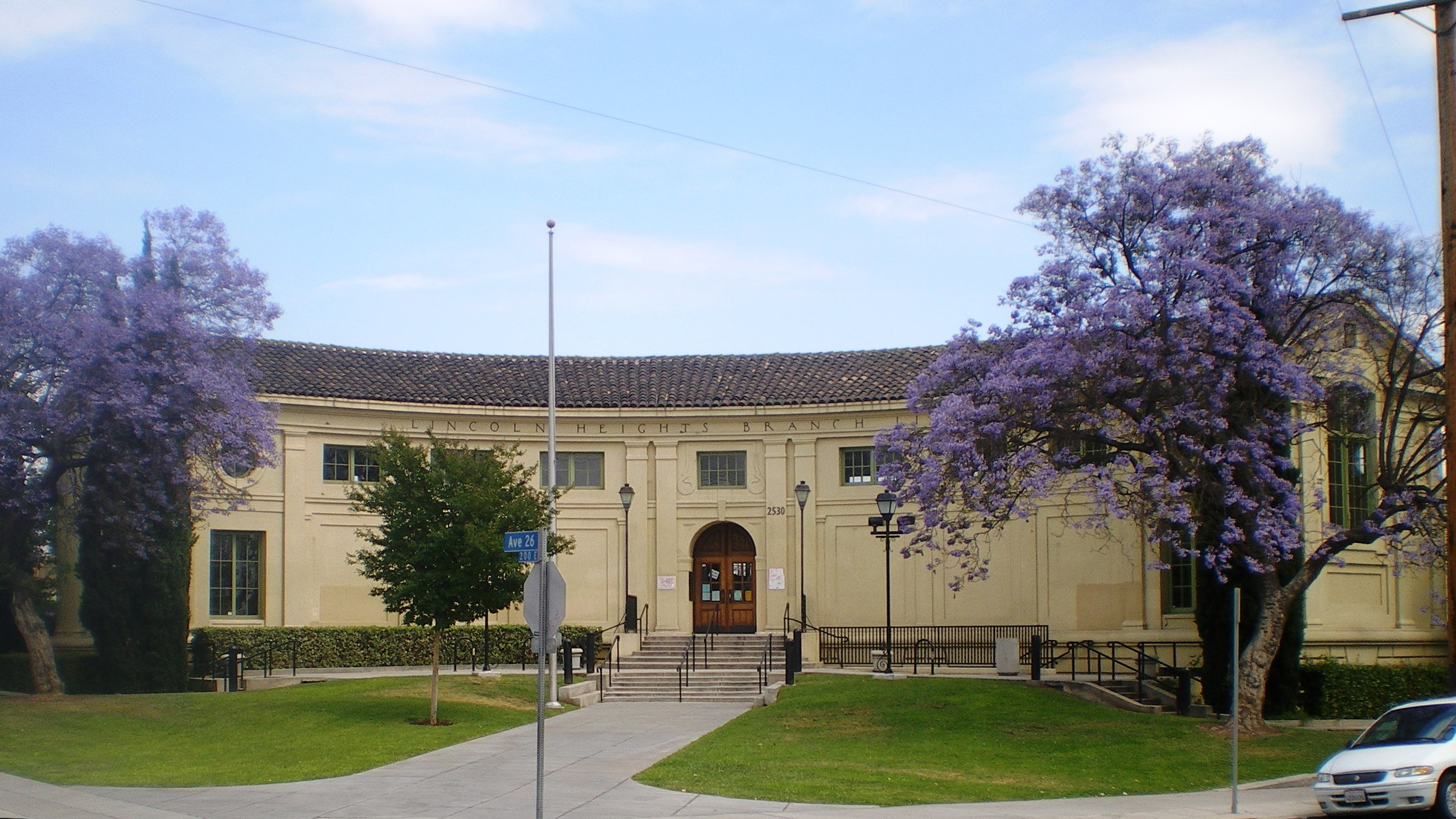
- Lincoln Heights Branch, May 2008

- Location within the Los Angeles metropolitan area Location within California Location within the United States
- Location: 2530 Workman St., Lincoln Heights, Los Angeles, California
- Coordinates: 34°4′34.25″N 118°12′50.54″W
- Built: 1916
- Architect: Lester H. Hibbard and H.B. Cody
- Architectural style: Italian Renaissance Revival, Classical Revival
- MPS: Los Angeles Branch Library System
- NRHP reference No.: 87001013
- LAHCM No.: 261

Significant dates
- Added to NRHP: May 19, 1987
- Designated LAHCM: June 3, 1983

Lincoln Heights Branch Library is the second oldest branch library in the Los Angeles Public Library system. Located in the Lincoln Heights section of Los Angeles, California, it was built in the Classical Revival and Italian Renaissance Revival styles in 1916 with a grant from Andrew Carnegie. One of three surviving Carnegie libraries in Los Angeles, it has been designated as a Historic-Cultural Monument and listed on the National Register of Historic Places.

== Early history and architecture ==
The history of the Lincoln Heights Branch began in 1900 with the establishment of a delivery station at Daly Street and Pasadena Avenue. In 1907, the Daly Street station merged with the East Main Branch to form the East Los Angeles Branch. That branch operated out of rented space at 2603 North Broadway starting in 1913.

In 1911, the Los Angeles Public Library received a $210,000 donation from Andrew Carnegie to build six new branch libraries, including the Lincoln Heights Branch. Plans for the new branch in Lincoln Heights were approved in 1915, with a design by Lester H. Hibbard and H.B. Cody. Hibbard and Cody based the design on the Italian Renaissance Villa, Papa Giulia near Rome.

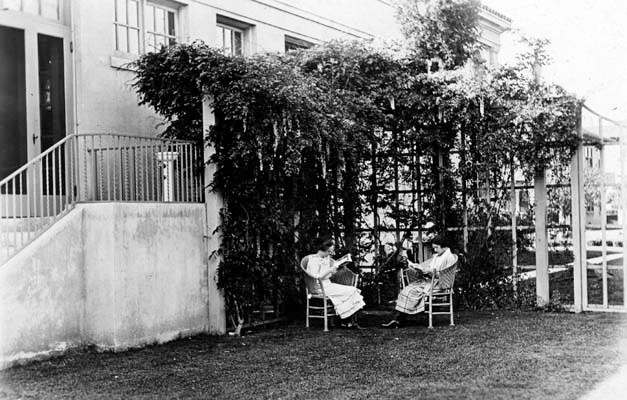
Postcard from Los Angeles Public Library collections showing patrons using the outdoor reading room at the Lincoln Heights branch.

The new library opened in August 1916 and was initially known as the Northeast Branch Library. The building is in the form of a quarter circle, with an extension of fourteen feet at each end. It is a combination of Italian Renaissance and Colonial styles. The end extensions are Colonial in design, and the main structure is of Italian Renaissance design. One of the unusual features of the new branch was an outdoor reading garden, an arbor in which benches were placed "for those who wish to read in the open." The new facility also included an auditorium with a stage and seating for 340 persons, and old English oak woodwork and shelves.

By 1919, the area had been renamed Lincoln Heights, and the library was designated at the Lincoln Heights Branch. A bas relief of Abraham Lincoln executed by Mrs. William Wendt was presented to the library in 1922 as a gift of the Auxiliary, B. of L.E.

In 1975, a community vote in the predominantly Latino area renamed the facility the "Biblioteca del Pueblo de Lincoln Heights."

== Historic designations ==
Carnegie paid for a total of six libraries in Los Angeles, and only three of the Carnegie libraries remain: Lincoln Heights, Cahuenga, and Vermont Square."

The Lincoln Heights Branch was designated as a Historic-Cultural Monument (#261) by the Los Angeles Cultural Heritage Commission in 1983. In 1987, the Lincoln Heights Branch and several other branch libraries in Los Angeles were added to the National Register of Historic Places as part of a thematic group submission. The pplication described Lincoln Heights Branch as being designed in the Classical Revival style with strong Beaux Arts influence. "The building's most unusual feature is its floor plan which is in the shape of a segment of a circle. ... The arched entry is centered in the middle and three series of concrete walkways with landings leading up to it. This tall one-story design features high clerestory windows which are inset between pilasters."

== Earthquake damage and renovation ==
The library suffered structural damage in the 1987 Whittier Narrows earthquake, and in March 1990, the branch was closed when it was determined to be out of compliance with earthquake safety requirements. A $3 million renovation project was completed with re-opening of the branch in June 1996. The building underwent seismic reinforcement work and was also renovated and expanded from 10,912 square feet (1,013.8 m^{2}) to 12,912 square feet (1,199.6 m^{2}). Carpeting and air conditioning were added, and a skylight covered for more than 50 years was uncovered and renovated, lighting the reference area. Computer workstations were also installed, and ceramic works of art by local artist Ricardo Rodriguez Duffy were placed on and above the columns.

== See also ==
- Los Angeles Historic-Cultural Monuments on the East and Northeast Sides
- Los Angeles Public Library
- National Register of Historic Places listings in Los Angeles
