= Los Angeles Branch Library System TR =

Historic district in Los Angeles, California

- Los Angeles Branch Library System
- U.S. National Register of Historic Places
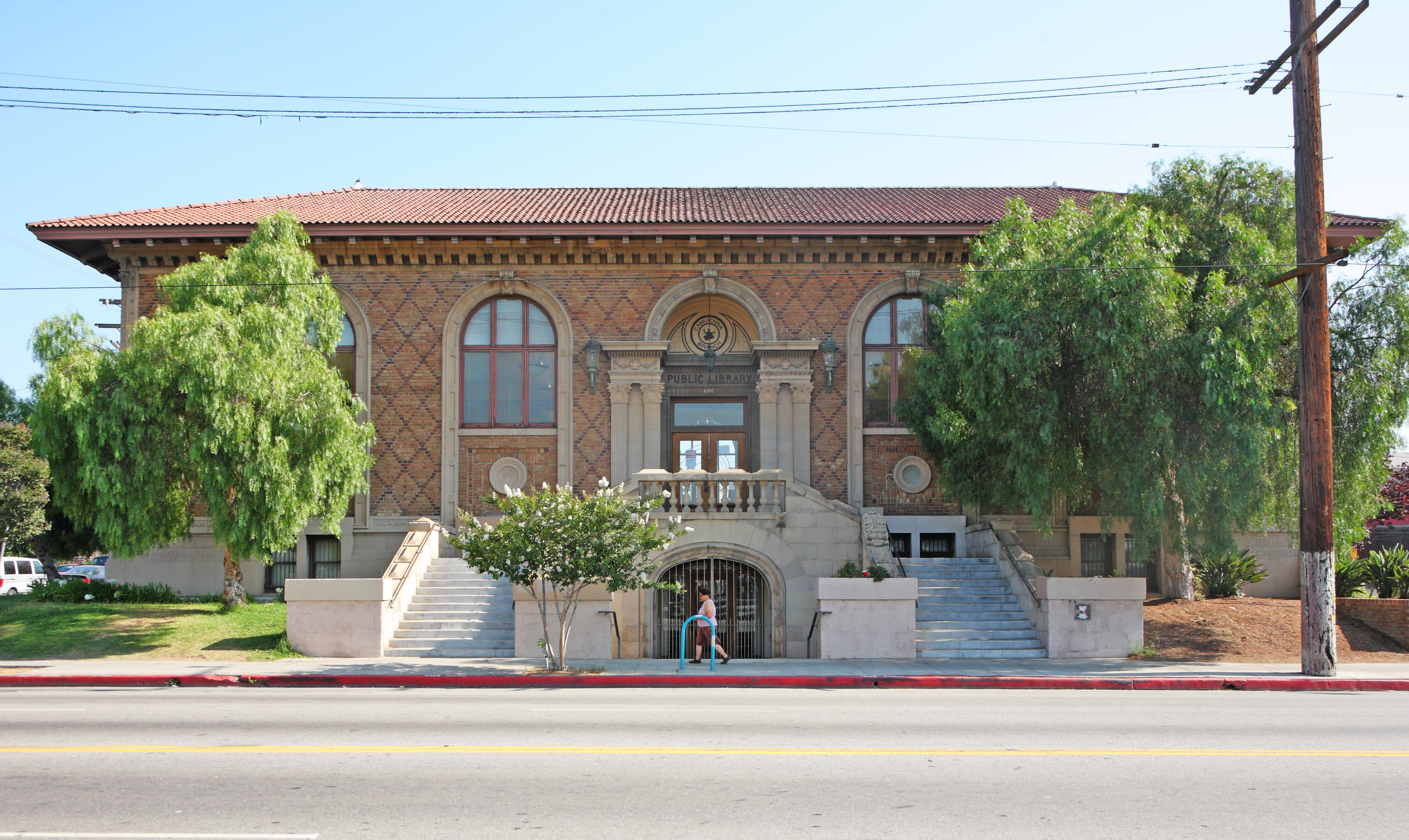
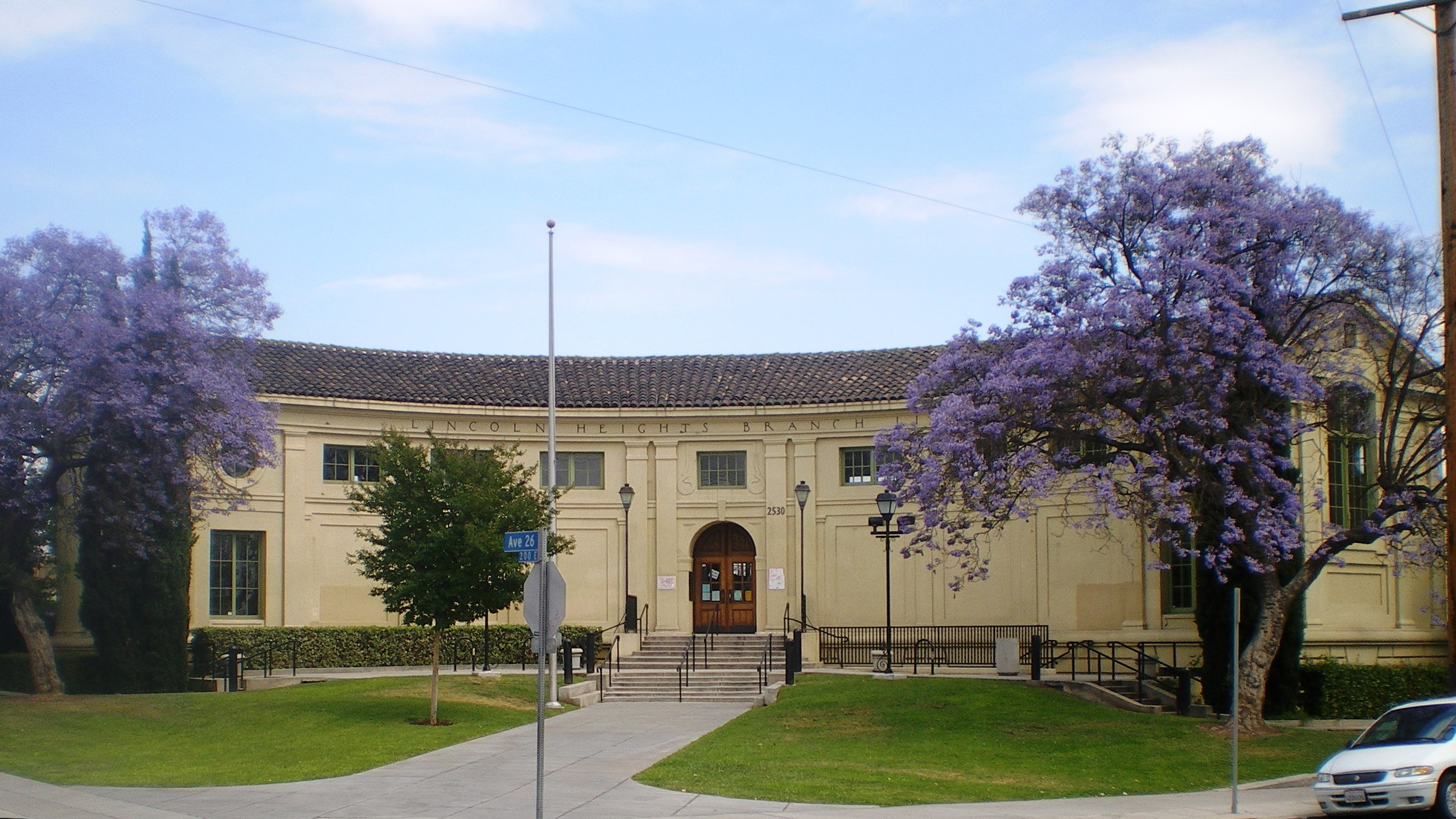
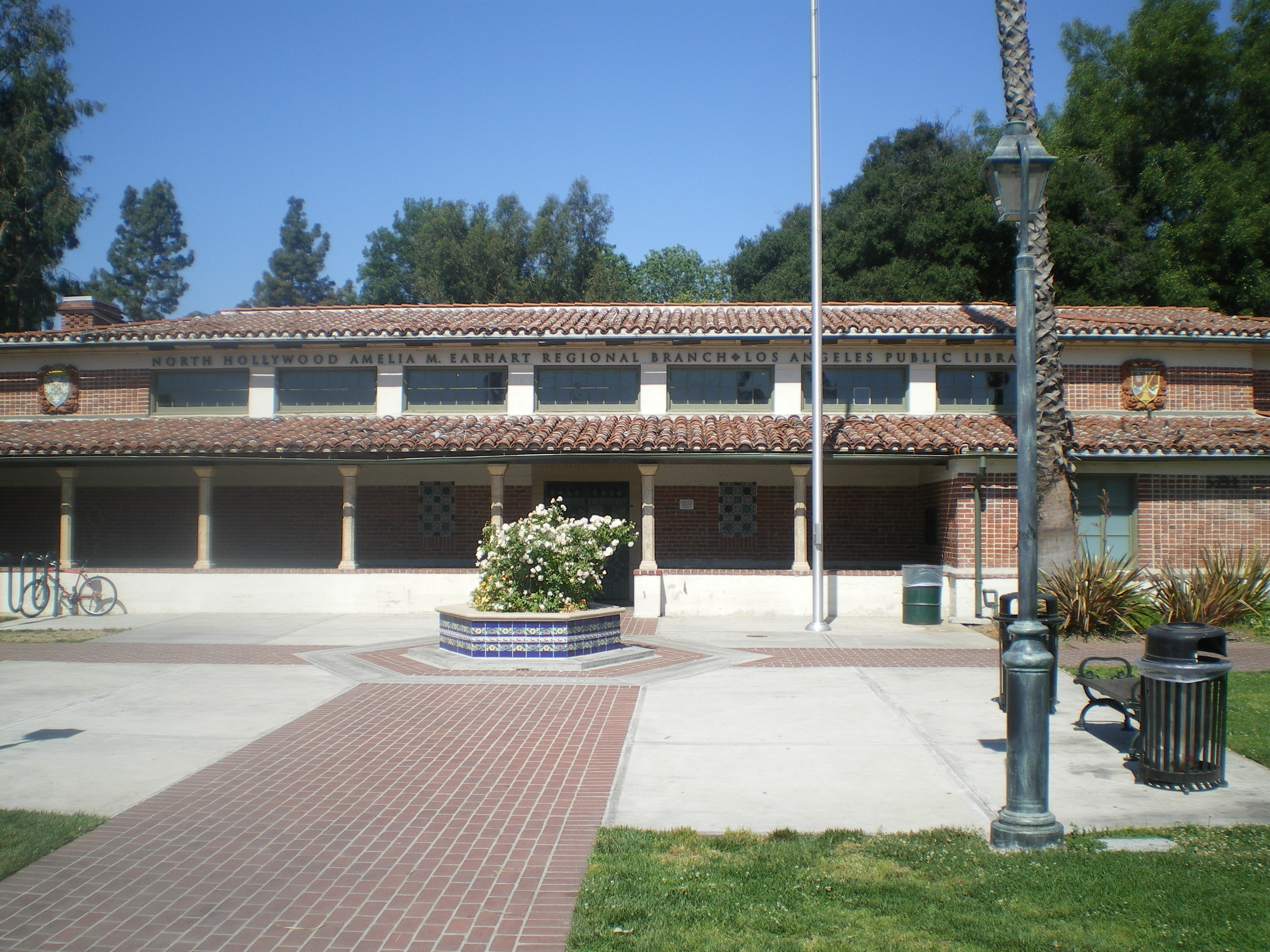
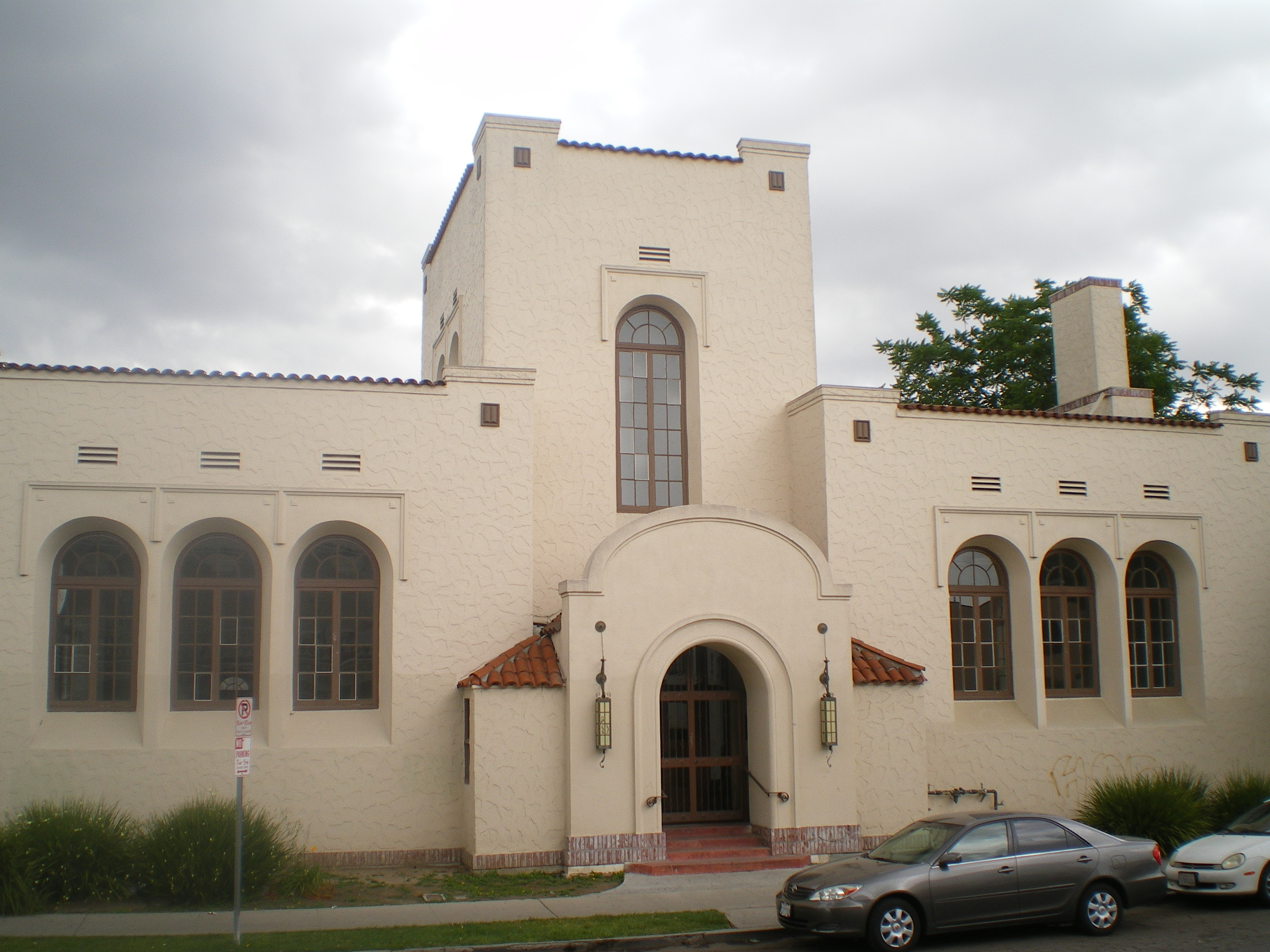
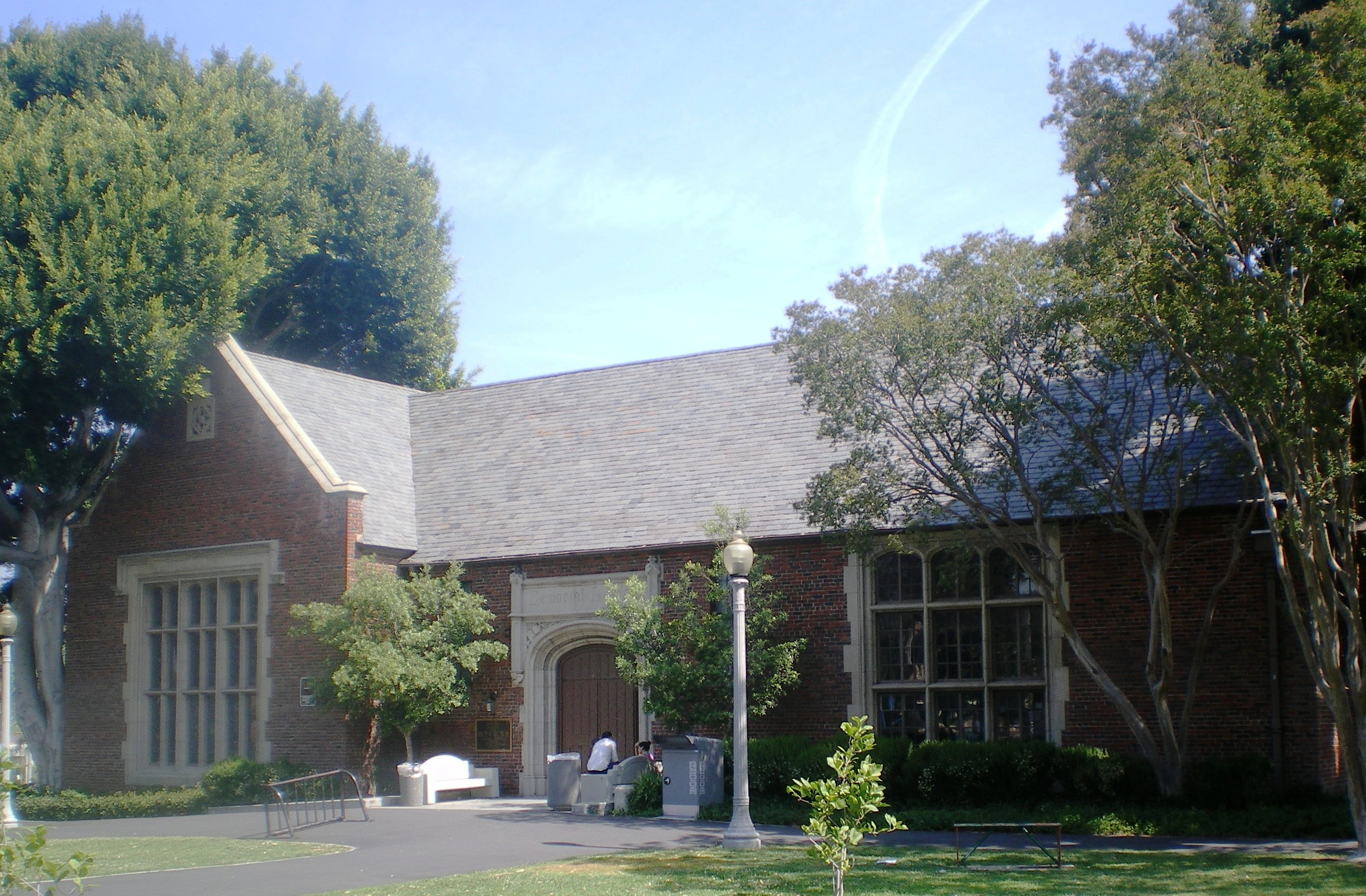
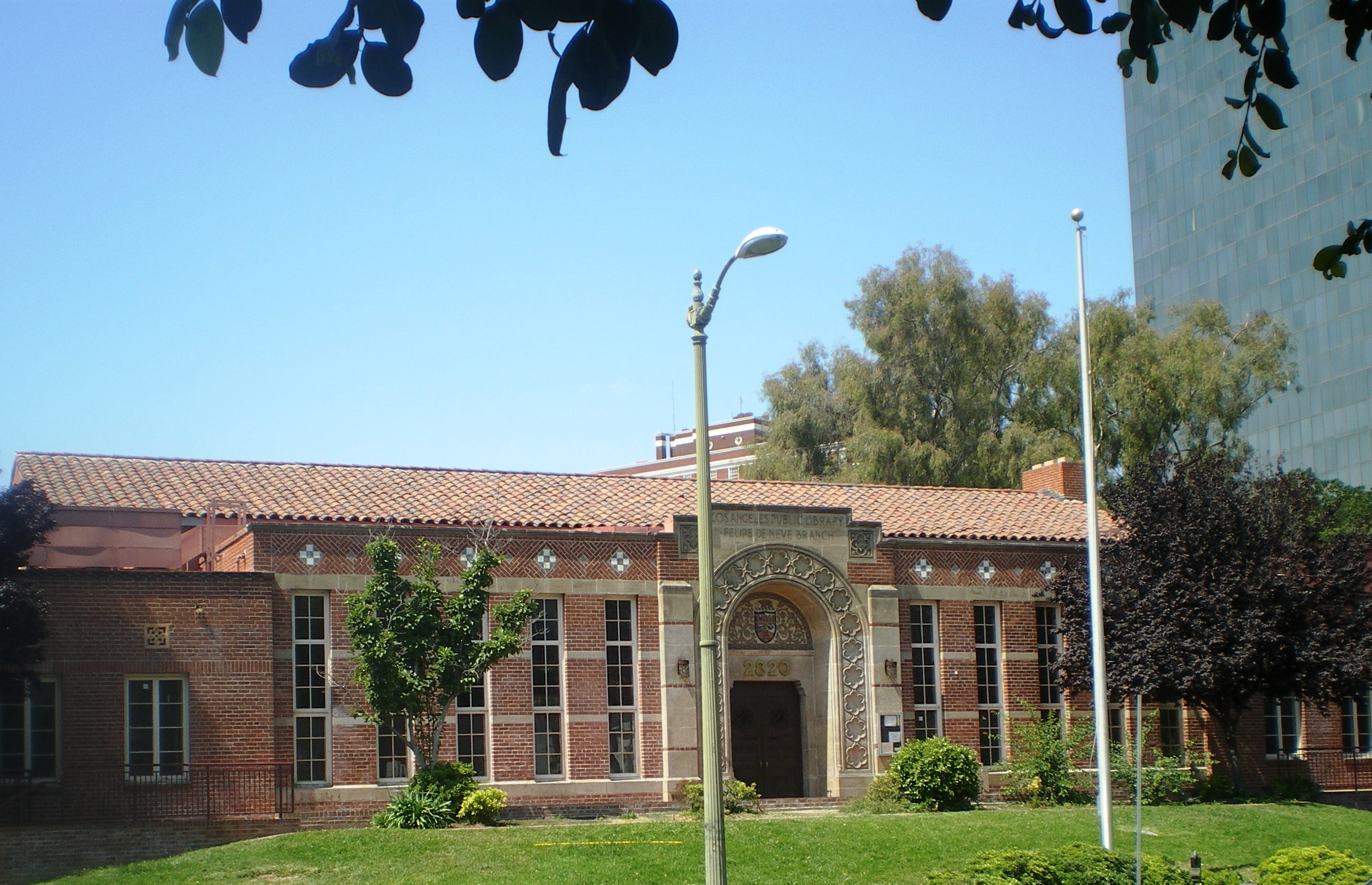
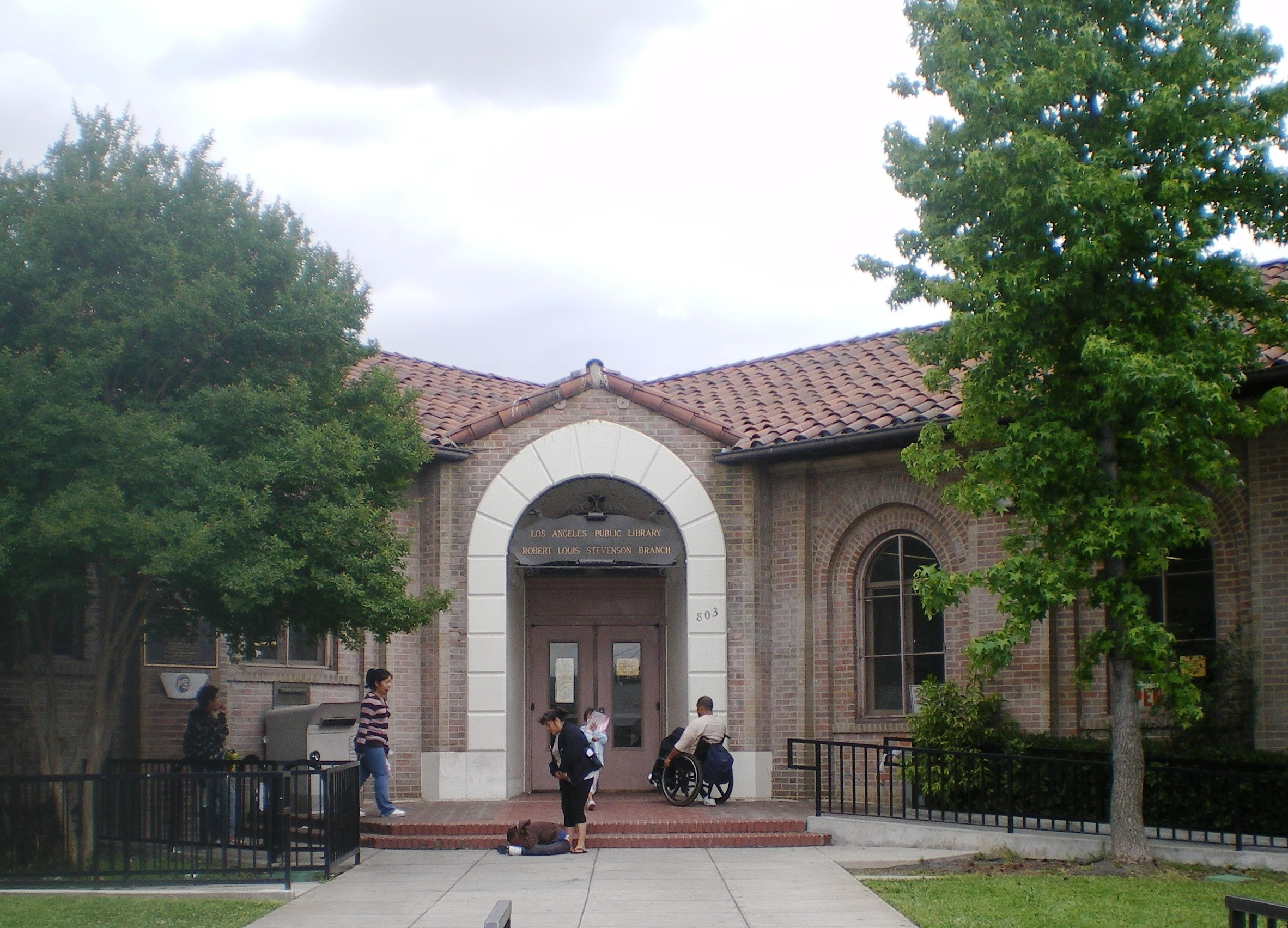
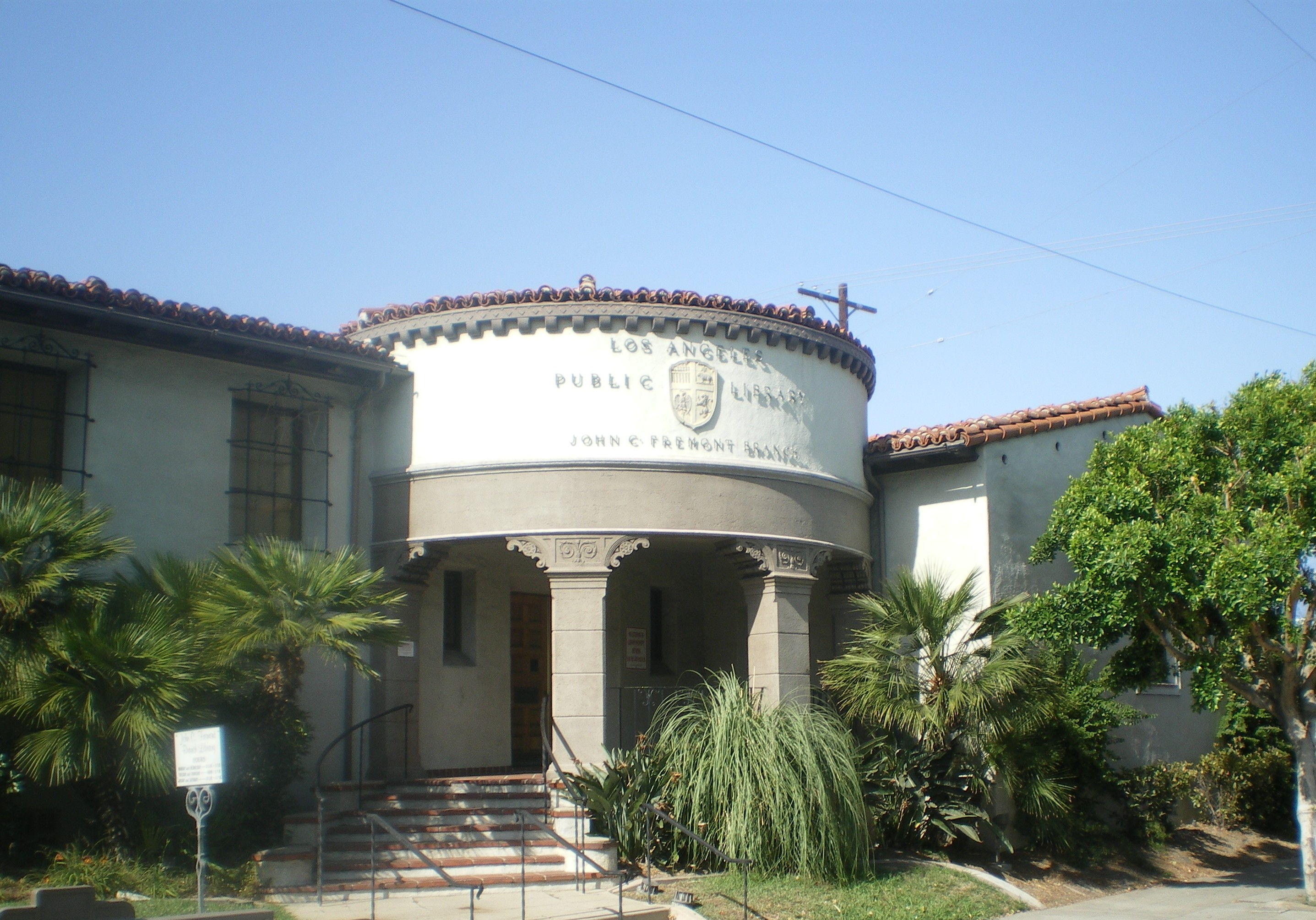
- 8 of the 22 branches. From left to right, top to bottom: Cahuenga, Lincoln Heights, North Hollywood, Moneta, Memorial, Felipe de Neve, Robert Louis Stevenson, and John C. Fremont.
- Location: Los Angeles, California
- Built: 1913–1930
- Architect: Multiple
- Architectural style: Revival
- NRHP reference No.: 64000066
- Added to NRHP: May 19, 1987

Los Angeles Branch Library System, also known as Los Angeles Public Library Branches, is a multiple property thematic submission to the National Register of Historic Places that consists of twenty-two branches of the Los Angeles Public Library.

== Description ==
Los Angeles Branch Library System is a thematic group of twenty-two buildings that were added to the National Register of Historic Places on May 19, 1987. Each building is an original branch of the Los Angeles Public Library built between 1913 and 1930, most were designed to incorporate features related to notable literary figures, and all feature Revival designs, including Classical, Colonial, Gothic, Italian Renaissance, Italian Romanesque, Mediterranean, Spanish, Spanish Colonial, and more. Most were designed by prominent architects of the time period, including Allison & Allison, John C. Austin, Lyman Farwell, Sumner Hunt, Marston, Van Pelt & Maybury, Weston and Weston, Austin Whittlesey, William Lee Woollett, and others, and as of 1987 all featured the majority of their original exterior with updated interiors. Several buildings are located in parks and many are the only buildings of landmark stature in their entire neighborhood.

== Libraries ==
The twenty-two branches included in the Los Angeles Branch Library System listing are:

- Vermont Square (1913)
- Lincoln Heights (1916)
- Cahuenga (1916)
- University (1923)
- Jefferson (1923)
- Moneta (1923)
- Helen Hunt Jackson (1925)
- Washington Irving (1926)
- Van Nuys (1926)
- Richard Henry Dana (1926)
- Wilshire (1926)
- Wilmington (1927)
- Malabar (1927)
- John C. Fremont (1927)
- Eagle Rock (1914, extensive remodel in 1927)
- Robert Louis Stevenson (1927)
- Angelus Mesa (1929)
- Felipe de Neve (1929)
- John Muir (1930)
- Venice (1930)
- Memorial (1930)
- North Hollywood (1930)

Figueroa (1923) and Pio Pico (1923–1979) branches were originally included but later removed, the former due to remodeling and the latter because it was demolished. Additionally, Hollywood (1940) and Edendale (1923) branches were not included due to remodeling; Hollywood Branch has since been demolished.

According to the listing in the National Register of Historic Places, three branches, Echo Park (1928–1971), East Los Angeles (1916–1974), and San Pedro, were not listed because they were demolished after the 1971 Sylmar earthquake. However, other sources list Vernon (1915–1974), not San Pedro, as one of the three branches demolished after the 1971 earthquake. Additionally, while San Pedro Branch has undergone several demolitions, none were due to damage from the 1971 earthquake.

== See also ==
- List of Los Angeles Public Library branch locations
