= Felipe de Neve Branch Library =

- Felipe de Neve Branch
- U.S. National Register of Historic Places
- Los Angeles Historic-Cultural Monument
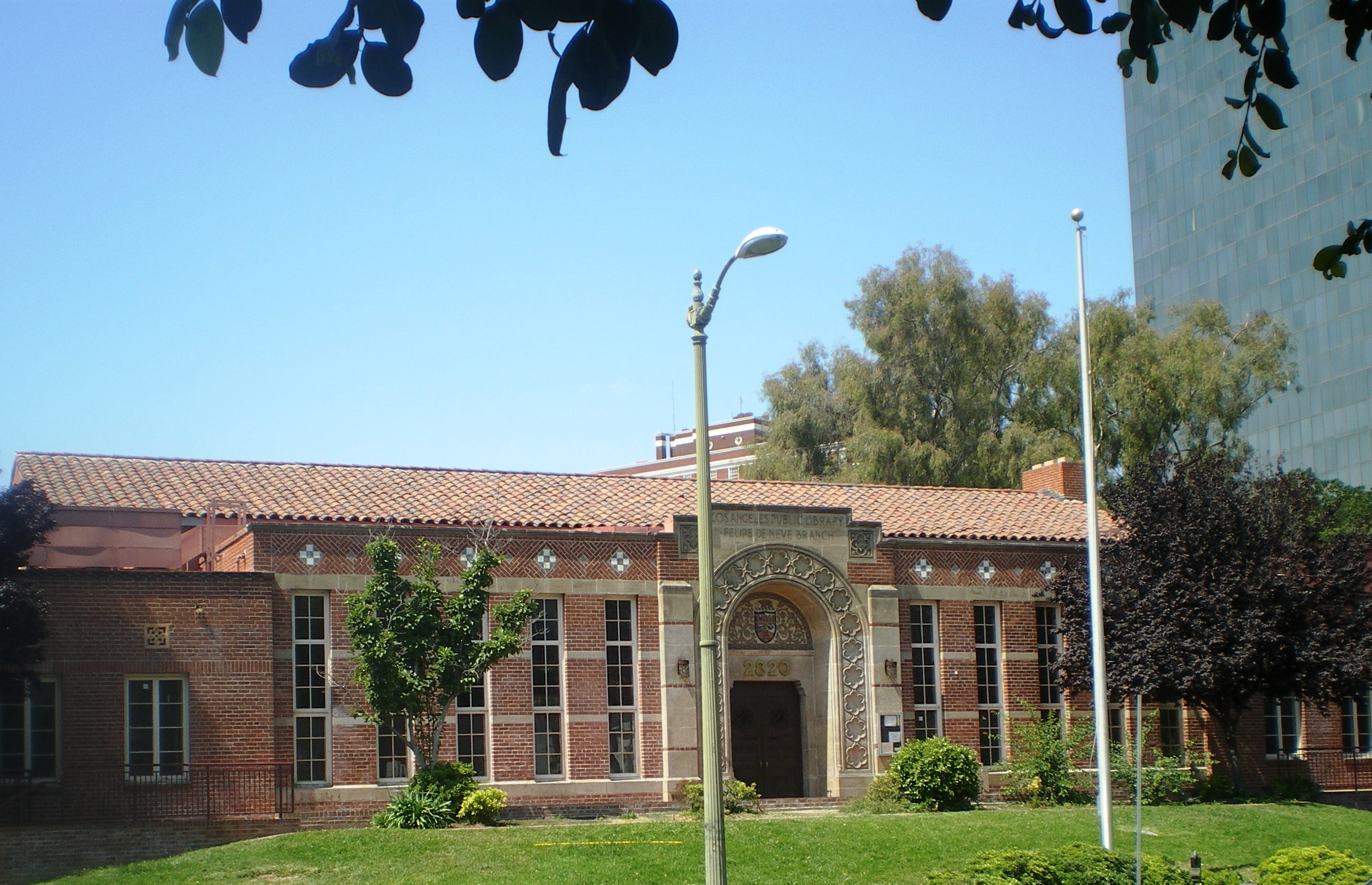
- Felipe de Neve Branch, May 2008

- Location within the Los Angeles metropolitan area Location within California Location within the United States
- Location: 2820 W. 6th St., Los Angeles, California
- Coordinates: 34°3′46″N 118°16′14″W
- Built: 1929
- Architect: Austin Whittlesey
- Architectural style: Mediterranean Revival-Classical Revival; Late 19th And 20th Century Revivals
- MPS: Los Angeles Branch Library System
- NRHP reference No.: 87001008
- LAHCM No.: 452

Significant dates
- Added to NRHP: May 19, 1987
- Designated LAHCM: 1989-10-17

Felipe de Neve Branch Library is a branch library of the Los Angeles Public Library located in Lafayette Park in Westlake, Los Angeles.

== History ==
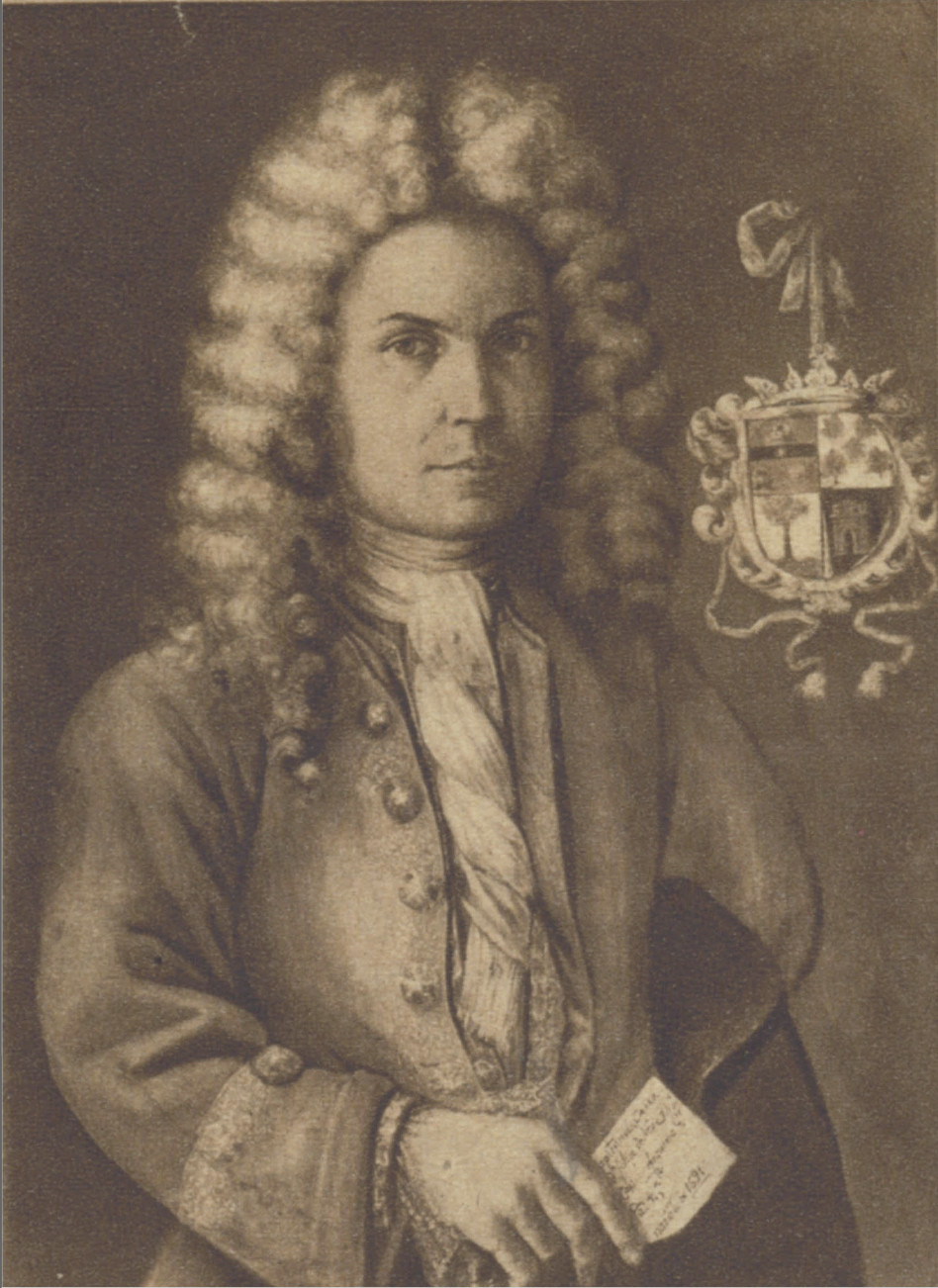
The branch is named after Felipe de Neve, founder of Los Angeles and 4th Governor of the Californias.

It was built in 1929 based on a Mediterranean Revival-Classical Revival design by Austin Whittlesey. The branch was named after Felipe de Neve, the Spanish governor of California who oversaw the founding of Los Angeles. The branch was opened on Felipe de Neve Day in 1929, celebrating the 148th anniversary of the founding of Los Angeles.

The Felipe de Neve Branch was designated a Historic-Cultural Monument by the Los Angeles Cultural Heritage Commission in January 1984. In 1987, the De Neve Branch and several other branch libraries in Los Angeles were added to the National Register of Historic Places as part of a thematic group submission. The application noted De Neve Branch is a one-story Mediterranean style brick building with a red tile roof. The street elevation is elaborately decorated with symmetrically arranged groupings of windows and black and white tile decorations in the shape of diamonds and crosses. The seal of the city made of mosaic tile is above the front doors. A horseshoe-shaped cast stone border of a floral design surrounds the top of the seal and doors.

== See also ==
- National Register of Historic Places listings in Los Angeles
- List of Los Angeles Historic-Cultural Monuments in the Wilshire and Westlake areas
- Los Angeles Public Library
