= Richard Henry Dana Branch =

- Dana, Richard Henry, Branch
- U.S. National Register of Historic Places
- Los Angeles Historic-Cultural Monument
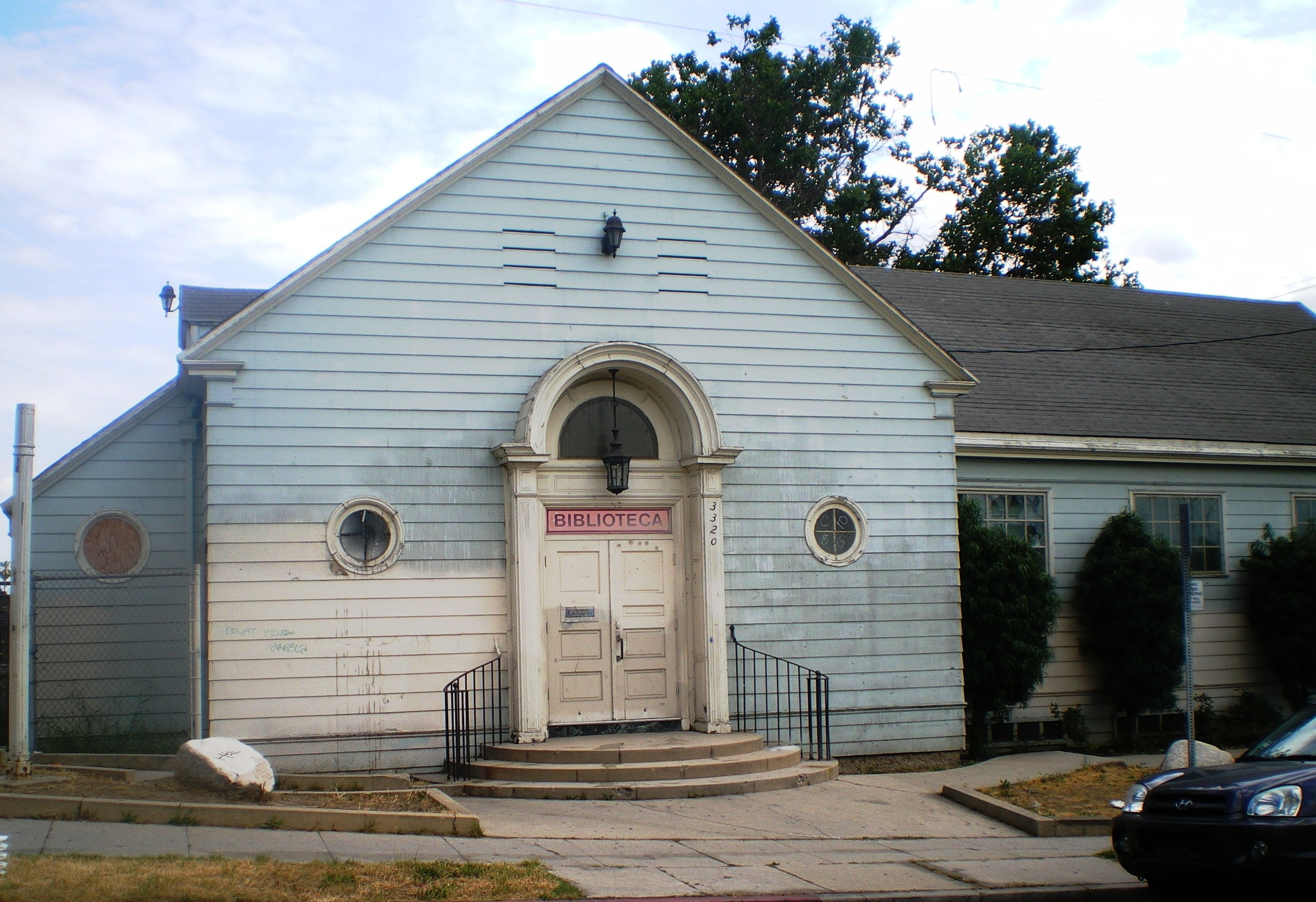
- Richard Henry Dana Branch, closed and vacant, May 2008

- Location within the Los Angeles metropolitan area Location within California Location within the United States
- Location: 3320 Pepper Ave., Cypress Park, Los Angeles, California
- Coordinates: 34°5′27″N 118°13′18″W
- Built: 1926
- Architect: Bent, Harry S.
- Architectural style: Georgian Revival
- MPS: Los Angeles Branch Library System
- NRHP reference No.: 87001007
- LAHCM No.: 1004

Significant dates
- Added to NRHP: May 19, 1987
- Designated LAHCM: September 14, 2011

Richard Henry Dana Branch, named after Richard Henry Dana Jr. and later known as the Cypress Park Branch, is a former branch library of the Los Angeles Public Library located in the Cypress Park, Los Angeles, California section of Los Angeles, California. The Georgian Revival style building was built in 1926 based on a design by architect Harry S. Bent.

In 1987, the Richard Henry Dana Branch and several other branch libraries in Los Angeles were added to the National Register of Historic Places as part of a thematic group submission. The application noted that Dana Branch is a one-story New England Colonial Revival Style building. It is designed in an L-plan with a high-pitched gable roof. The portico features paired wood paneled doors with an arched canopy supported by paneled posts. It was initially creamy green with a deep green roof.

In 2001, ground was broken for the construction of a new branch library in Cypress Park. The new branch, with 35,000 books, several computer stations and a community meeting room, is three times larger than the schoolhouse-type library branch on Pepper Avenue that served Cypress Park since 1927. There were plans to use the old branch as a senior citizens center.

The old library reopened as a community center on December 14, 2015. It has been renamed as The Cypress Park Club House.

== See also ==
- List of Registered Historic Places in Los Angeles
- Los Angeles Public Library
