= Venice Branch =

- U.S. National Register of Historic Places
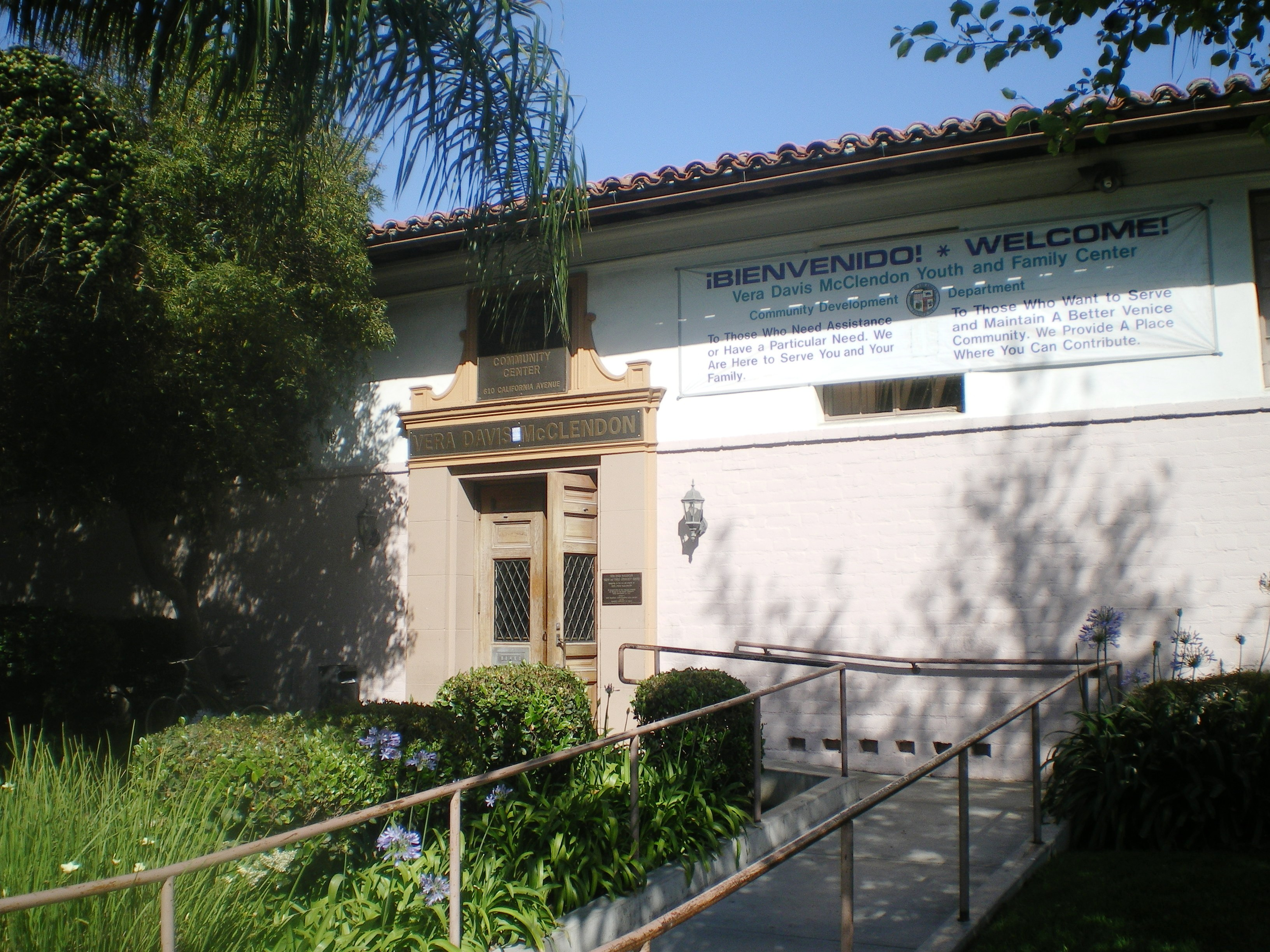
- Former Venice Branch, May 2008

- Location within the Los Angeles metropolitan area Location within California Location within the United States
- Location: 610 California Ave., Venice, Los Angeles, California
- Coordinates: 33°59′28″N 118°28′29″W
- Built: 1930
- Architect: Witmer, David L.; Crosel, Joe
- Architectural style: Mission Revival-Spanish Colonial Revival
- MPS: Los Angeles Branch Library System
- NRHP reference No.: 87001020
- Added to NRHP: May 19, 1987

Venice Branch is a former branch of the Los Angeles Public Library located in the Venice district of Los Angeles, California. The branch library was dedicated on April 7, 1930 and served as the Venice branch library until the 1995 opening of the Venice-Abbot Kinney Memorial Branch. The Spanish Colonial Revival style building was re-purposed as the Vera Davis McClendon Youth and Family Center. The center was closed for renovations in 2019 and as of August 2026 has yet to be reopened.

The Venice Branch was designated as a Los Angeles Historic-Cultural Monument by the Los Angeles Cultural Heritage Commission in June 1984. In 1987, the Venice Branch and several other branch libraries in Los Angeles were added to the National Register of Historic Places as part of a thematic group submission. The application noted that Venice Branch is in the Spanish Colonial Revival style made of masonry construction. The front entry has oak double doors with diamond-shaped panes. Small wrought-iron lamps flank the entrance.

== See also ==
- List of Registered Historic Places in Los Angeles
- Los Angeles Public Library
