= John C. Fremont Branch Library, Los Angeles =

- John C. Fremont Branch
- U.S. National Register of Historic Places
- Los Angeles Historic-Cultural Monument
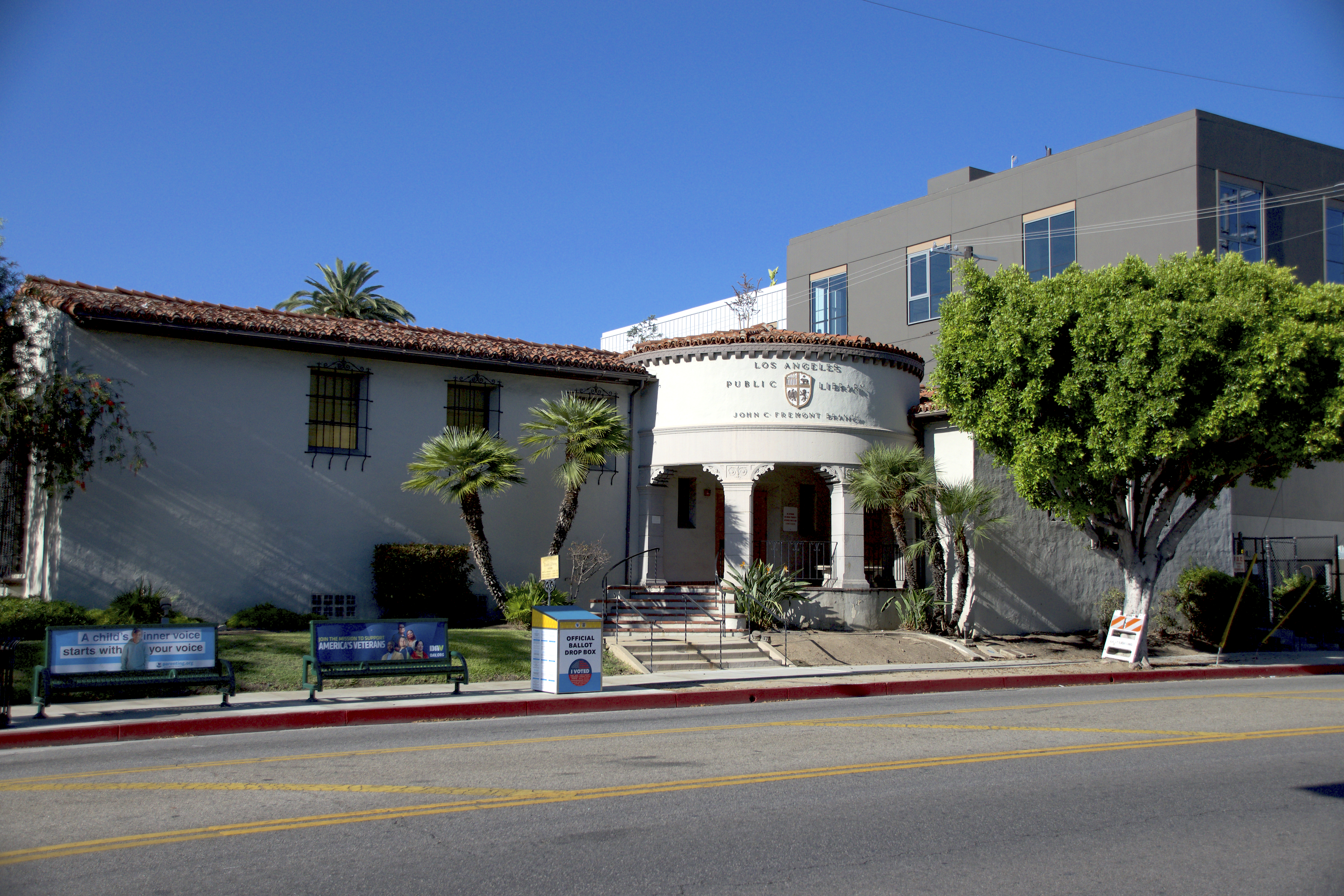
- Fremont Branch, 2026

- Location within the Los Angeles metropolitan area Location within California Location within the United States
- Location: 6121 Melrose Avenue; Los Angeles, California
- Coordinates: 34°5′1″N 118°19′59″W
- Built: 1927
- Architect: Barker, Merl L.
- Architectural style: Late 19th And 20th Century Revivals, Mediterranean Revival
- MPS: Los Angeles Branch Library System
- NRHP reference No.: 87001009
- LAHCM No.: 303

Significant dates
- Added to NRHP: May 19, 1987
- Designated LAHCM: June 27, 1986

John C. Fremont Branch Library is a branch library of the Los Angeles Public Library in Los Angeles, California. It is adjacent to the Hancock Park district. It was built in 1927 based on a Mediterranean Revival design by architect Merl L. Barker.

In 1987, the Fremont Branch and several other branch libraries in Los Angeles were added to the National Register of Historic Places as part of a thematic group submission.

The current facility began construction on December 26, 1926 and was completed in May 1927. The library opened on June 1, 1927. The library closed in 1990 because its masonry was not reinforced and the building was not in compliance with seismic safety codes. The library operated from a temporary location until February 1996. The library re-opened in its current location on March 26, 1996. The in-compliance library gained air conditioning, a meeting room, a small parking lot, wiring for computer and internet usage, and access for disabled persons.

== See also ==
- List of Registered Historic Places in Los Angeles
- Los Angeles Public Library
