= Wilshire Branch Library =

- Wilshire Branch
- U.S. National Register of Historic Places
- Los Angeles Historic-Cultural Monument
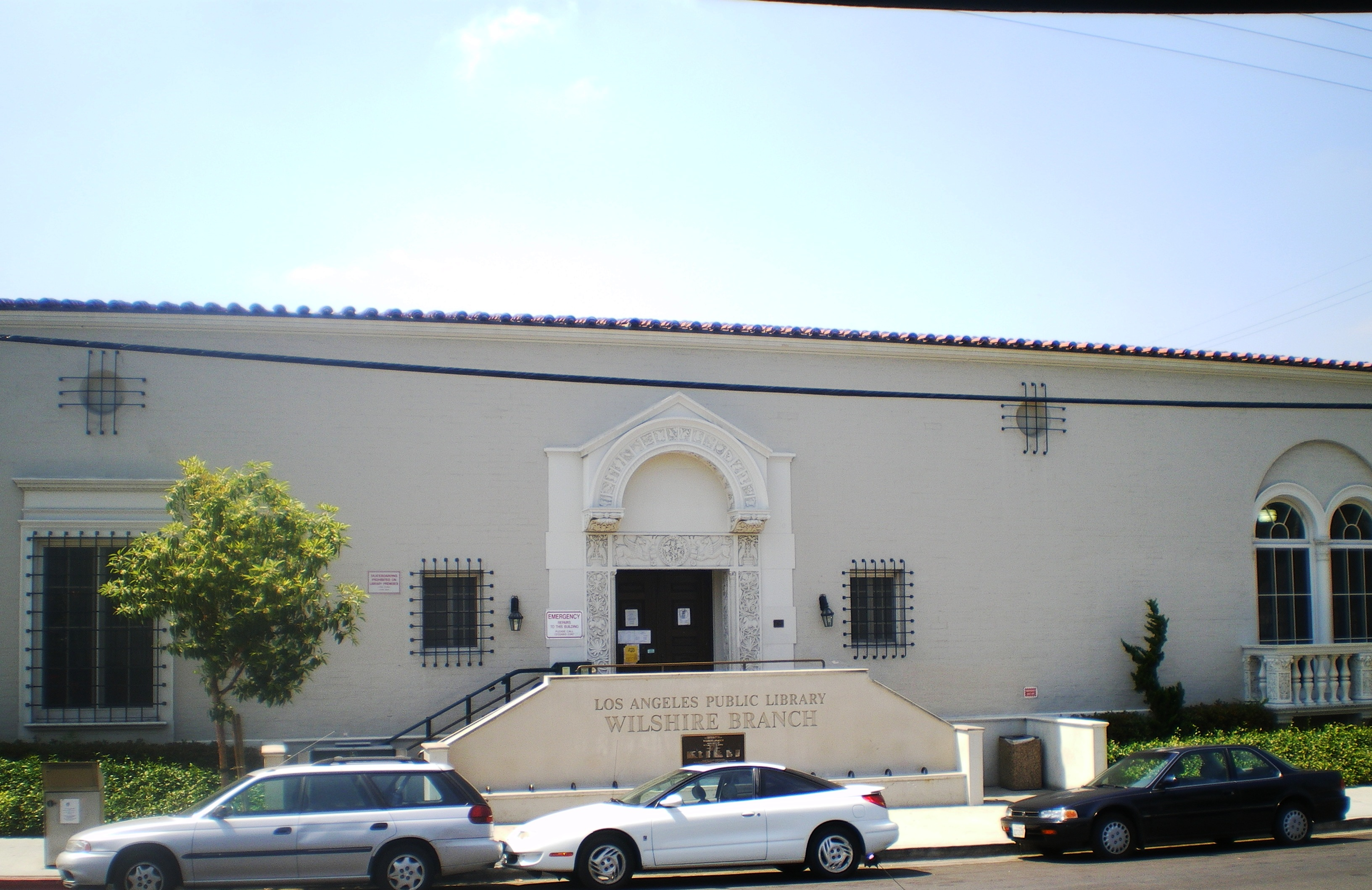
- Wilshire Branch, 2008

- Location within the Los Angeles metropolitan area Location within California Location within the United States
- Location: 149 N. Saint Andrews Pl., Los Angeles, California
- Coordinates: 34°4′28″N 118°18′39″W
- Built: 1926
- Architect: Ruoff, Allen
- Architectural style: Spanish Colonial Revival
- MPS: Los Angeles Branch Library System
- NRHP reference No.: 87001024
- LAHCM No.: 415

Significant dates
- Added to NRHP: May 19, 1987
- Designated LAHCM: 1989-02-01

Wilshire Branch Library, a branch of the Los Angeles Public Library, is a piece of history nestled in the Mid-Wilshire section of Los Angeles, California. Constructed in 1926, this library was designed by renowned architect Allen Ruoff, drawing inspiration from the Italian Romanesque style.

In 1987, the Wilshire Branch and several other branch libraries in Los Angeles were added to the National Register of Historic Places as part of a thematic group submission.

== Services and programs ==
Its collection includes books, magazines, DVDs, and various digital resources. The library provides free access to computers and Wi-Fi for students, job seekers, and researchers. Regular programs include children's story times, adult book clubs, and educational workshops on topics ranging from digital literacy to financial planning. The library also hosts special events and community gatherings.

== Community engagement ==
As a community hub, the Wilshire Branch Library collaborates with local schools, organizations, and community groups to offer outreach programs and events that cater to the interests and needs of local residents. The library's commitment to accessibility and inclusivity is reflected in its diverse range of services, which are designed to support lifelong learning and community engagement.

== See also ==
- National Register of Historic Places listings in Los Angeles
- List of Los Angeles Historic-Cultural Monuments in the Wilshire and Westlake areas
- Los Angeles Public Library
