= John Muir Branch Library, Los Angeles =

- John Muir Branch Library
- U.S. National Register of Historic Places
- Los Angeles Historic-Cultural Monument
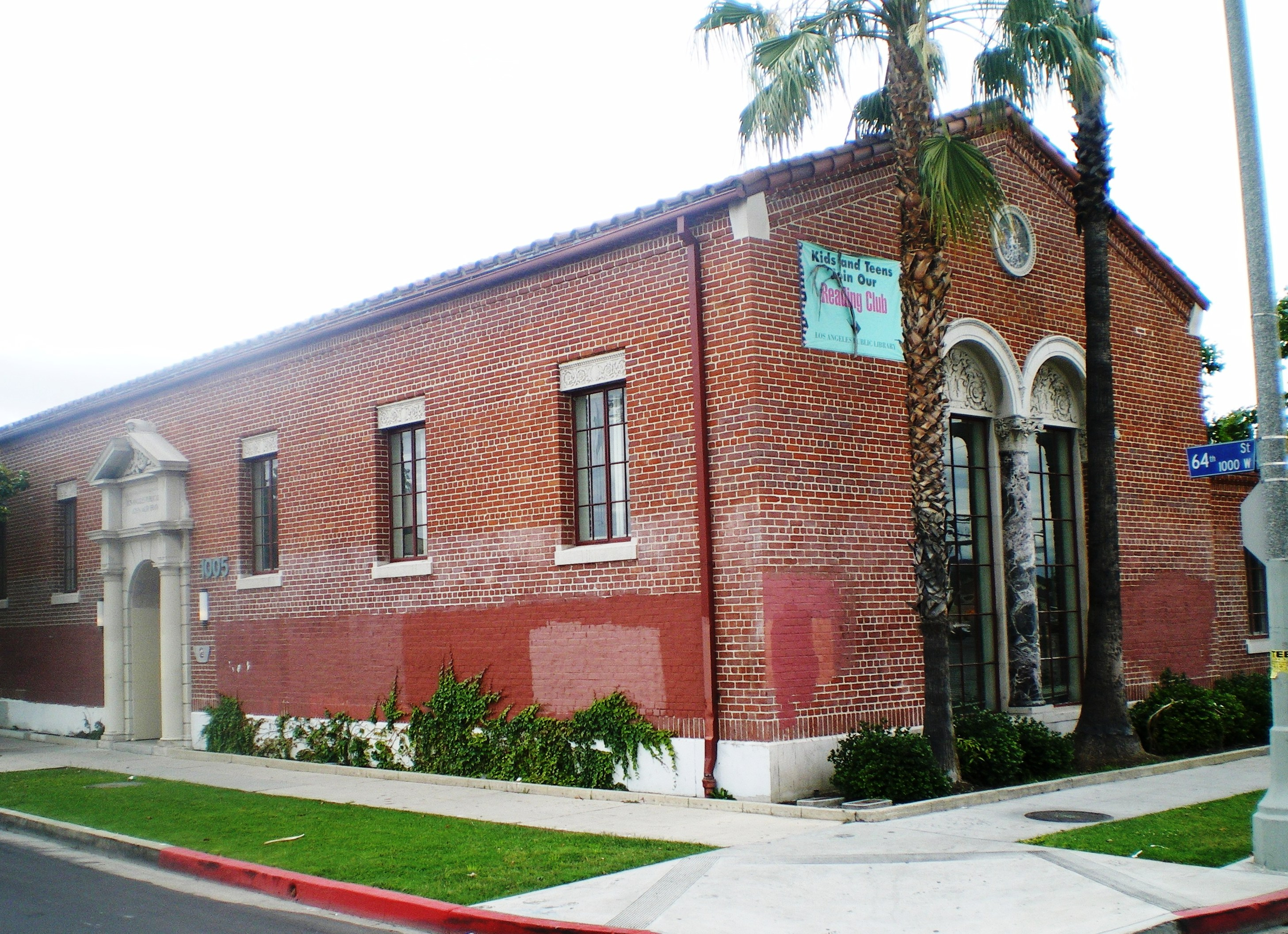

- Location within the Los Angeles metropolitan area Location within California Location within the United States
- Location: 1005 W. 64th St., Los Angeles, California
- Coordinates: 33°58′53″N 118°17′24″W
- Built: 1930
- Architect: Henry Franklin Withey
- Architectural style: Late 19th and 20th Century Revivals, Spanish Revival
- MPS: Los Angeles Branch Library System
- NRHP reference No.: 87001017
- LAHCM No.: 305

Significant dates
- Added to NRHP: May 19, 1987
- Designated LAHCM: June 27, 1986

John Muir Branch Library is a branch library of the Los Angeles Public Library. It was built in 1930 based on a design by Henry Franklin Withey.

In 1987, the Muir Branch and several other branch libraries in Los Angeles were added to the National Register of Historic Places as part of a thematic group submission.

Following damage to the building in a series of earthquakes, the library temporarily relocated to a mini-mall in 1987. The historic library was reopened in 1997.

== See also ==
- List of Registered Historic Places in Los Angeles
- List of Los Angeles Historic-Cultural Monuments in South Los Angeles
- Los Angeles Public Library
