= Robert Louis Stevenson Branch Library =

- U.S. National Register of Historic Places
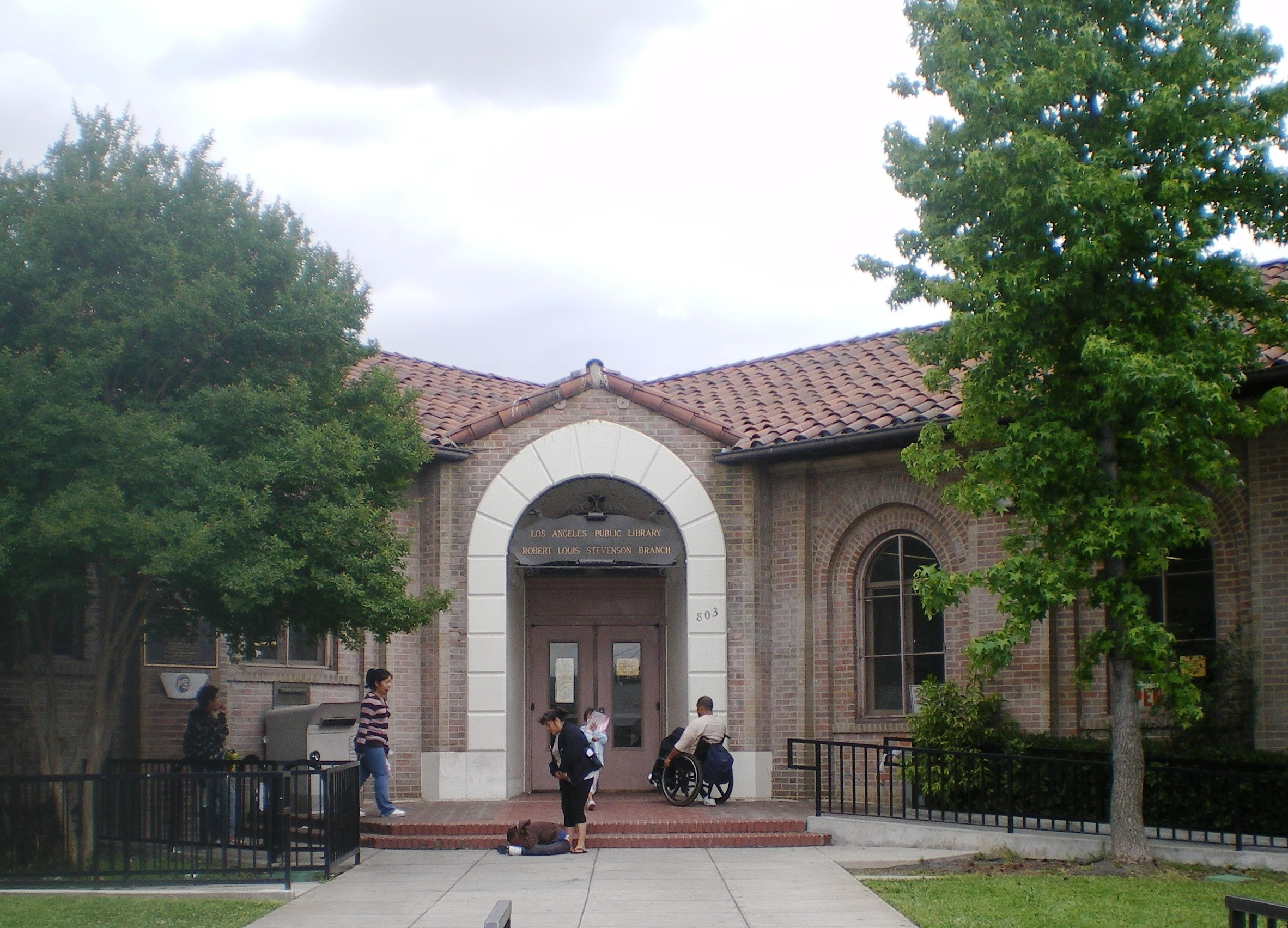
- Stevenson Branch, 2008

- Location within the Los Angeles metropolitan area Location within California Location within the United States
- Location: 803 Spence St., Boyle Heights, Los Angeles, California
- Coordinates: 34°1′40″N 118°11′50″W
- Built: 1927
- Architect: Lindsay, George L.
- Architectural style: Mission-Spanish Colonial Revival
- MPS: Los Angeles Branch Library System
- NRHP reference No.: 87001021
- Added to NRHP: May 19, 1987

Robert Louis Stevenson Branch Library is a branch library of the Los Angeles Public Library located in the Boyle Heights section of Los Angeles, California. It was built in 1927 based on a Spanish Colonial Revival design by architect George L. Lindsay.

== History ==
In 1987, the Stevenson Branch and several other branch libraries in Los Angeles were added to the National Register of Historic Places as part of a thematic group submission.

=== Whittier Narrows Earthquake and Reconstruction ===
The Branch was temporarily closed in 1987 due to the Whittier Narrows Earthquake, along with 6 other L.A. branch libraries. The structural damage reported totaled approximately $32,000. On July 28, 1988, while the building was closed for repairs, the branch was moved to a temporary location on 3500 Whittier Blvd, Los Angeles. Through the relocation process, over ten thousand volumes of books were moved from the damaged library to the temporary location. Funding from the City of Los Angeles Community Development Department was used by Martinez-Hirsch Associates to design and lead the renovation and expansion of the damaged building. Although the library officials expected to be at the temporary location for many years, the library was re-opened on July 3, 1991.

== See also ==
- List of Registered Historic Places in Los Angeles
- Los Angeles Public Library
