= Nobuho Nagasawa =

Japanese artist

- 長澤 伸穂
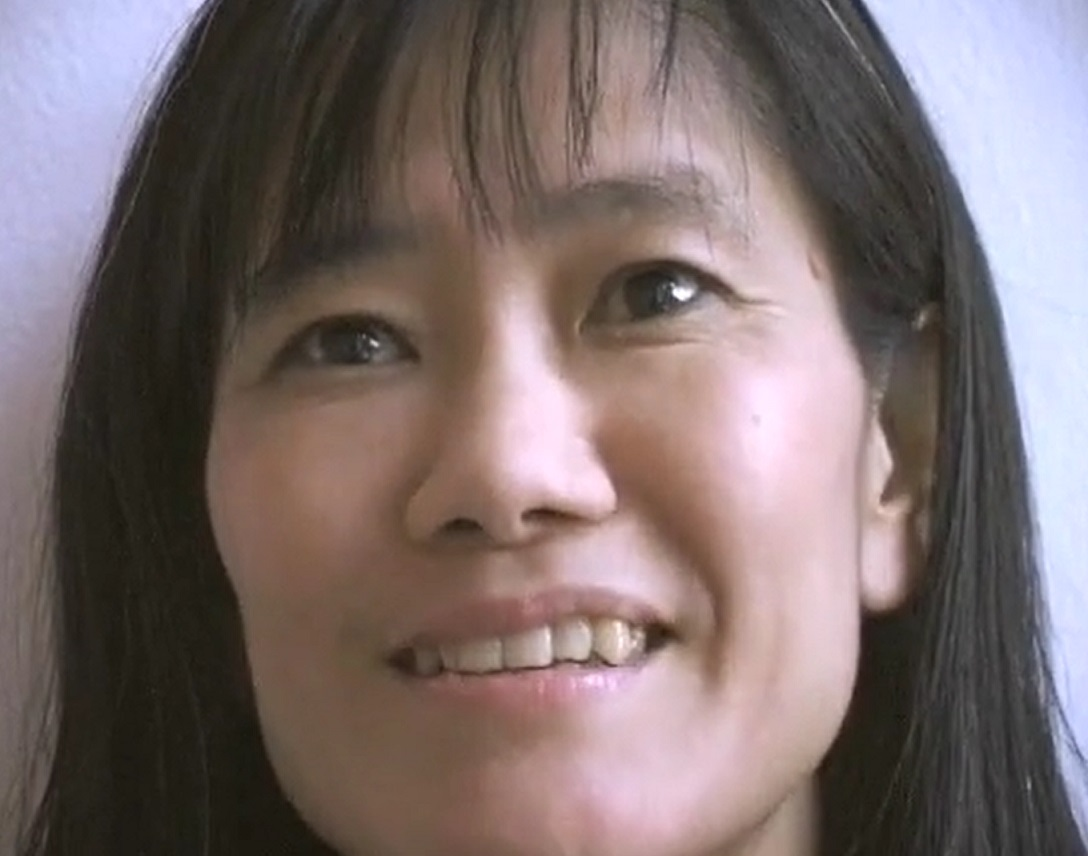
- Nagasawa in Speaking Portraits
- Born: 1959 (age 66–67); Tokyo, Japan
- Other name: Nagasawa Nobuho (長澤伸穂)
- Occupations: transdisciplinary artist, visual artist, sculptor
- Years active: 1984-
- Movement: land art, Site-specific art, Environmental sculpture, Installation art

Nobuho Nagasawa (長澤伸穂, Nagasawa Nobuho; born in 1959) is a Japanese-born US-based transdisciplinary artist. Nagasawa is known for her site-specific installations involving in-depth research into the cultural history and memory, and extensive community participation. Her works were featured in international exhibitions including the Asian Art Biennial (Bangladesh, 2002), the Sharjah Biennial (United Arab Emirates, 2003), and the Echigo-Tsumari Art Triennial (Japan, 2003). She has exhibited extensively in galleries and museums in Asia, Europe, and the North America. The venues include, the Royal Garden of the Prague Castle (Czech Republic), Ludwig Museum (Hungary), Rufino Tamayo Museum (Mexico), Sharjah Art Museum (United Arab Emirates), Alexandria Library (Egypt), among others. Recipient of the 1997 Design Excellence Award for Architecture and Public Art, through the Cultural Affairs Office in Los Angeles, Nagasawa has been commissioned more than 20 public art projects, including projects in California, Washington, Texas, New York, and Japan. Nagasawa was previously Professor at the Claremont Graduate University, Scrips College, California (1992–1996) and Professor at the University of California, Santa Cruz (1996–2001), and has been Professor at the State University of New York at Stony Brook since 2001.

== Biography ==
=== Early life and career in Japan, the Netherlands, and West Germany (1959–1985) ===
Although Nagasawa was born in 1959 and raised in Tokyo, her father was on a diplomatic mission in the Netherlands, and the family lived in The Hague for four and half years. After graduating from high school in Tokyo in 1978, Nagasawa returned to the Netherlands, where she spent part of her childhood, and completed her undergraduate degree at the State Academy of Fine Arts in Maastricht. According to the art historian Midori Yoshimoto, “When [Nagasawa] visited Documenta VII (1982) in Kassel, Germany, on her graduation from Maastricht in 1982, she encountered Joseph Beuys’s tree-planting campaign, 7000 Oaks (1982–1987). Nagasawa was inspired by his philosophy that ‘everyone is an artist, and that creativity is the most important tool in effecting social transformation’, and became ‘interested in producing works on an environmental scale and engaging people throughout the creative process’.” Subsequently, Nagasawa moved to West Berlin in 1982 to pursue her Master of Fine Art at the Hochschule der Künste Berlin (currently Berlin University of the Arts). Nagasawa “considered [West Berlin] to be a ‘living example of the division between East and West’ and an ‘island floating on the “Red Sea”’. She responded to the cosmopolitan culture of Berlin and identified with being a ‘Berliner’. Nagasawa remembers visiting ‘Eastern bloc countries to experience not only the physical obstacles but also the cultural gap between East and West’. She grew aware of ‘how issues such as “self”, “other”, “gender”, “race”, and “alienation” are all intertwined on the conscious and subconscious spheres of human experiences’ and that ‘the “self” was, in part, self-constructed through interactions with others’.”

==== Noyaki (field firing) (1984) ====
In 1984, one year before graduating from the Hochschule der Künste Berlin, Nagasawa was impressed by the sight of the Great Wall of China vanishing into the desert during a trip on the Trans-Siberian Railway from Berlin to Beijing. Midori Yoshimoto explains: “The cross-continental adventure made her realise how many civilisations had risen and fallen due to conquest or conflicts over territory and resources throughout history. The Great Wall was a grand monument to history and these dynamics. Upon returning to her native country after a six-year absence, Nagasawa decided to visit the renowned ceramicist Ryoji Koie, whose series of earth sculptures— which she had seen at an exhibition in Switzerland—left a strong impression on her. Although Koie did not respond to her letter, she spontaneously visited him in Tokoname [in Aichi Prefecture] and accepted his offer to stay with him and his family for four months.” In Tokoname, Nagasawa produced her first earthwork Noyaki (field firing), which was inspired by the image of the Berlin Wall gradually being reduced to the earth. After piling up soil mixed with seawater to form a huge wall, she used waste wood collected with the help of local people to burn it in the open air, but the warm air currents generated by the field firing caused rain to fall on the final seventh day of the field firing.

==== Navel of the Earth (1985) ====
In 1985, after returning to Berlin and graduating from the Hochschule der Künste Berlin, Nagasawa decided to dig a crater-like hole 14 meters in diameter in the ruins of a Jewish synagogue in Kreuzberg, near the Berlin Wall. Nagasawa recalls: “My goal was to give new life to the earth that had been destroyed during World War II. It was about healing the place, and the people who lived through that ordeal. Excavating the earth in Berlin was a dangerous endeavor, because the bombs buried in the ground during the war could still detonate without warning. Needless to say, my proposal of excavating and burning the earth to revitalize the land was intensely debated among the Jewish and German communities.” “After several months of listening to the communities and better explaining her intentions, she eventually received permission. Nagasawa removed enough earth at the site to create a crater-like hole and burnt a significant amount of sawdust in it by protecting the fire with large steel plates.” This site-specific earthwork is titled Navel of the Earth (1985) and it still exists as a small community garden in the reunited city of Berlin today. These experiences of producing earthworks led to Nagasawa's later public art practice during her time in California, in which she developed her work in interaction with the local community.

=== On-site production in Prague, Budapest, and Aachen (1993–1994) ===
==== Where are you going? Where are you from? (1993) in Prague ====
Source: In 1993, Nagasawa was invited to participate in the first ever touring exhibition of Japanese contemporary art in Eastern Europe, Invisible Nature, curated by Ivona Raimanova, Director of the Art Planning Department of the Office of the President of the Czech Republic. Nagasawa was invited by the President of the Czech Republic, the first host country of the exhibition, to create her site-specific earthworks. In contrast to the huge wooden and iron works transported from Japan by Shigeo Toya and Saburo Muraoka, who participated in the same exhibition, Nagasawa preferred to create her work locally during her four-week stay in Prague, building a 28 meter long, 5 meter high bridge in the Royal Gardens of Prague Castle using thousands of sandbags. The work is entitled Where are you going? Where are you from? (1993). A bridge structure resembles the nearby 14th-century Charles Bridge, which connects the Old Town with the New Town of Prague. According to Nagasawa, “I orchestrated a group of young workers from both the Czech Republic and Slovakia to collaborate with me in the construction. The idea was to ‘bridge’ the two nations through sharing daily physical labor and facilitating conversations between the two parties. By the end of the construction, more people from other countries had come together as my friends arrived from Berlin and Los Angeles. At times, tourists from around the world who came across our construction would volunteer their time toward the construction of the bridge. [...] once the bridge construction was done, I installed a large hourglass made from the Bohemian crystal. The large-scale hourglass contained two colors of sand, one from the Czech Republic and the other from Slovakia. As sand ran through the hourglass, the two colors mixed and flowed into one another, and yet individual grains remained distinct, emphasizing the individuality of the two nations. The hourglass embodies temporal repetition as itself is an event of history. I felt honored that President Havel was the first person at the opening to recognize the significance of the work and to manually turn the hourglass – a resonance of consolidation between the Czech Republic and Slovakia.”

==== Arcus (1993) in Budapest ====
The exhibition's next venue was the Ludwig Museum in Budapest, the capital of Hungary. Although the exhibition was the same, Nagasawa did not neglect to do research in each location to create works that took into account the history and environment of the respective host city. She created the work entitled Arcus (1993), meaning “gate” in Latin. Nagasawa explains: “Hungary was the first country to take down its barbed wire barriers and open its borders to Eastern Europeans fleeing to the West. Using sandbags, I constructed in collaboration with Hungarian youth a triumphal arch that resembled the historic Chain Bridge. Tangled barbed wire barriers were stacked on both sides, forcing viewers to walk through the arch. The structure was sited in such a way that the real Chain Bridge became visible as one passed through the arch. The installation addressed the historical significance of Hungary’s role as a gateway to freedom.”

==== Pfalzkapelle (1994) in Aachen ====
The following year, the exhibition travelled to the Ludwig Forum for International Art in Aachen, Germany, where the octagonal dome entitled Pfalzkapelle (1994) was built to resemble the dome of Aachen Cathedral, built by Emperor Karl the Great in the 8th century. During the production of her work, Nagasawa happened to learn that Aachen Cathedral had been covered with sandbags during the First World War to protect it from bombing. Nagasawa's dome Pfalzkapelle was constructed by layers of sandbags and barbed wire mesh, with the ceiling open to the sky symbolizing a wish for peace. As the hourglass in the dome ticked, the different colored sands from East and West Berlin mingled and came together, as if to visualize reunited Germany, which until just five years before the exhibition had remained divided, and the collapsing boundaries between communism and capitalism itself.

Through these on-site collaborative productions and presentations in three European locations, Nagasawa reaffirmed the nature of her work as an opportunity to evoke not only people's shared public memories of war, politics and ethnic strife, but also their personal memories and to look at them from a new perspective, leading to the development of her subsequent projects.

=== Emergence of the Egg Motif (1995–Present) ===
==== Bunker Motel: Emergency Womb (1995) in Thyborøn, Denmark ====
Nagasawa participated in Peace Sculpture 1995 in Denmark, which commemorated the 50th anniversary of the end of World War II and presented her project Bunker Motel: Emergency Womb (1995) in Thyborøn. According to Nagasawa: “The Danish coast is littered with 7000 military bunkers built during World War II under Hitler’s Atlantic Wall Fortification Project. These bunkers have stood empty and without use like a painful scar on the Danish landscape for more than 50 years. For this project, I transformed several of the bunkers in the village of Thyborøn into motels for lovers. I heard that some of the bunkers were used as a secret hideaway for lovers after the war. However, the locals were not comfortable discussing the past, and I was even more troubled that some of the “living memories” of the people were not being passed down to the younger generation. I furnished several of the bunkers with military cots; pillows and blankets were made from military bags and filled with sand and sugar. The use of sugar was a symbol for the heroism of local fishermen during World War II, an example of one such living memory. At a time when sugar was a pre- cious commodity, they secretly gathered it and mixed it with the concrete. They thought that adding sugar to concrete would reduce the strength of the bunker structures. This was a highly risky attempt and a desperate act of resistance against the Nazi Germans. However, since sugar and cement have no chemical reaction, their effort was unsuccessful, and resulted in a shortage of sugar for the Danish households. For me, these stories embody a bittersweet memory of the history of this place which no one seemed to talk about or care to pass on to the younger generation. While staying in this village, I offered a workshop at the only school there and invited all 500 school children to participate in my project. They joined me in casting 500 plaster eggs, each the size of a human brain. On the anniversary of Liberation Day, children and their families gathered together at the school and I hand- ed each child a plaster egg. Together we formed a procession and placed all the eggs in the Bunker Motels.” For Nagasawa, “The number 500 corresponds to the approximate number of ova a woman releases in her reproductive lifetime. Hence, the 500 eggs act as a symbol of rebirth and regeneration from the calamities of war. White, on the other hand, is the flag color of surrender.” Bunker Motel: Emergency Womb, which was completed through dialogue, discussion and mutual understanding with the villagers, provided an opportunity for not only the villagers but also the visitors to the exhibition from all over the world to reflect on the history of the war and their personal memories, and to look back at them from a perspective connected to their present lives and to the future. It also gave young people who had never experienced war the opportunity to hear the stories of adults who had, thus enabling intergenerational dialogue. On the other hand, the experience of such close interaction with the local people further strengthened Nagasawa's awareness of the role of artists in society.

==== On the Edge of Time (2001) in Dhaka, Bangladesh ====
On the Edge of Time (2001), produced locally for the 10th Asia Art Biennial, held in Dhaka, Bangladesh in 2001–2002, involved the firing of approximately 4,700 terracotta eggs in collaboration with a local university and Hindu potters. The eggs were then stacked to form two piles, one large and one small, at the exhibition site. By asking local communities for transporting the terracotta eggs made by Hindu potters, who are a minority in the Islamic country of Bangladesh, Nagasawa's project seemed to challenge the inter-cultural strife that has come to light since 9/11, by saying that art is not bound by differences of nation or creed.

==== her render: she gives back naturally what is true in her nature (2003) in Sharjah, United Arab Emirates ====
Nagasawa has continued to emphasize the transience and strength of life by using the egg as a symbol of life in her work, replacing it with various materials. According to Midori Yoshimoto, “In 2003, when the war in Iraq had just begun, she presented her render at the 6th Sharjah Biennial in the United Arab Emirates. She produced ‘eggs’ made of rock salt wrapped in nylon stockings. The quantity of salt in each egg was roughly equivalent to how much salt is required for a year of human life. One hundred eggs removed from the nylon after drying were considered ‘male’. Another hundred remaining wrapped in nylon were considered ‘female’.” Nagasawa asked the young female students, who were to become the first female graduates from the art department of the Sharjah University, to write their private thoughts, such as their dreams and aspirations, on unsigned female eggs. The artist hoped that through art, women, who are strictly regulated in Islamic society, would be liberated and have the opportunity to express their joys as women in a public space. “Initially, the exhibition organizer, the Sultan’s daughter, Sheikha Hoor Al-Qasimi, was concerned that her project would cause a public outcry of indecency because of the ‘contentious’ material (nylon stockings) and that it was based on ‘American feminism’, and thus was patronizing. Bravely, Nagasawa wrote a letter directly to the Sultan's daughter, primarily to stress that she is a ‘Japanese’ living in the United States and as such was a member of a ‘minority’. In addition, the letter sought to convince the Sultan's daughter that her work should not be narrowly labelled as ‘feminist’, arguing that it came from a more humanistic viewpoint and sought to connect with Muslim women. The inner thoughts she was hoping to draw upon from these women were not necessarily expected to be the ‘voices of suffering’ but rather the ‘voices of joy and dignity of being women in their own right’.30 Nagasawa's letter was effective and the project was carried out to completion. Afterwards, a number of the participating women reported that the collaboration process inspired ‘meaningful change and a real sense of possibility’. The full title, her render: she gives back naturally what is true in her nature meant ‘giving oneself to another, rendering oneself, and flowering’ or ‘what woman can offer from within herself’. The eggs covered in nylon perhaps represented Muslim women in veils. Through writing on the eggs, women's voices and inner worlds became visible and were heard. As this example demonstrates, Nagasawa's position as an outsider enables her to discover the hidden voices of those marginalized by the societies she visits and renders them into poetic form. This is an ability she has nurtured through her transnational experiences.”

==== Time Sculpture – Koro-pok-kuru (2012) in Hokkaido, Japan ====
In Nagasawa’s recent project entitled Time Sculpture – Koro-pok-kuru (2012), “she created a circular earthwork with two entry points on its eastern and western sides and a hollow space surrounding a boulder in the centre. On the ridge of the circle, butterbur plants were planted, and the sloping shoulders of the earthwork were covered with grass so that visitors could lean their backs on the interior slope and look up at the sky. In addition, she constructed 500 ‘eggs’ (out of local soil, containing native flower seeds) with workshop participants and, with their help, installed them inside the sculpture. Since the number 500 corresponds to the approximate number of ova a woman releases in her lifetime, these eggs were made to symbolize the regeneration of the forest.” This work joined the permanent installations at the Tokachi Millennium Forest in Hokkaido, Japan. “Koro-pok-kuru are a race of ‘small people’, literally meaning, ‘people under the leaves of the butterbur plant’ in the language of the Ainu, the indigenous population of Hokkaido.” Midori Yoshimoto interprets: “This new work exemplifies the philosophy and process behind most of Nagasawa’s art, which involves in-depth research into the cultural history, environment and memory of the specific locations, as well as community participation. Through working with diverse communities on various projects she learns something new each time, and grows as an artist while planting the seeds of environmental and social transformation for those people.”

== Selected exhibitions ==
=== Group exhibitions ===
- 1993–1994 Invisible Nature, Prague, Czech Republic, Budapest, Hungary, and Aachen, Germany
- 1995 Peace Sculpture 1995, Thyborøn, Denmark
- 2002 10th Asian Art Biennial, Dhaka, Bangladesh.
- 2003 6th Sharjah Biennial, Sharjah, United Arab Emirates
- 2003 Echigo-Tsumari Art Triennial, Niigata, Japan
- 2013 Setouchi Triennale, Kagawa, Japan
- 2019 Nakanojo Biennial, Gunma, Japan

== Public art commissions ==
- 2009 Metropolitan Transportation Authority, Soto Station, Los Angeles, California
- 2010 University of Florida Business School, Gainesville, Florida
- 2011 Wood Street Mon Wharf Landing Project, Pittsburgh, PA
- 2011 Water Resources Administrations Building, St. Petersburg Florida
- 2012 Columbia Street, Brooklyn, New York
- 2013 Metropolitan Transportation Authority, Master plan, Baltimore, Maryland
- 2013 Islais Creek Promenade, San Francisco, California
- 2013 John Jay College for Criminal Justice, New York
- 2014 Oregon Institute of Technology, Klamath Falls, Oregon
- 2014 Quinebaug Valley Middle College High School Project, Danielson, Connecticut
- 2018 Hunter's Point South Waterfront Park, Long Island City, New York
