= Helen Hunt Jackson Branch =

- Jackson, Helen Hunt, Branch
- U.S. National Register of Historic Places
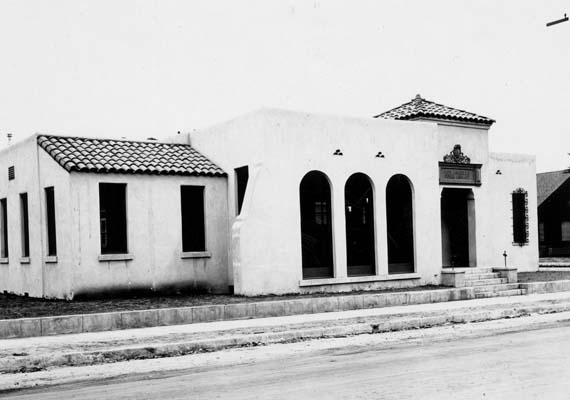
- Helen Hunt Jackson Branch, 1925

- Location within the Los Angeles metropolitan area Location within California Location within the United States
- Location: 2330 Naomi St., Los Angeles, California
- Coordinates: 34°1′1″N 118°15′8″W
- Built: 1925
- Architect: Noerenberg, C.E.
- Architectural style: Mission-Spanish Colonial Revival
- MPS: Los Angeles Branch Library System
- NRHP reference No.: 87001011
- Added to NRHP: May 19, 1987

Helen Hunt Jackson Branch is a former branch library of the Los Angeles Public Library.

== History ==
The Spanish Colonial Revival building was built in 1926 based on a design by architect C.E. Noerenberg. The branch was named for 19th Century American author Helen Hunt Jackson whose popular novel Ramona told the story of a romance between a mixed-race girl and an American Indian during the days of the California missions. The branch has ceased operating as a library and has been converted into a church building.

The branch began operations in rented rooms at 2701 Central Avenue. The branch was an outgrowth of the Central Avenue Branch, which was divided into two branches, the Helen Hunt Jackson Branch and the Bret Harte Branch. The new building for the Jackson Branch was built at 25th Street and Naomi Avenue opened in November 1925. At the time of the opening, the Los Angeles Times wrote: "Noerenberg, the architect, ... has succeeded in combining in this new library ample window lighting with sufficient wall and shelving space together with an attractive exterior. There is a main reading room 26 x 25, a children's room 22 x 23, a delightful clubroom for the neighborhood gatherings and kitchen and workroom for the staff."

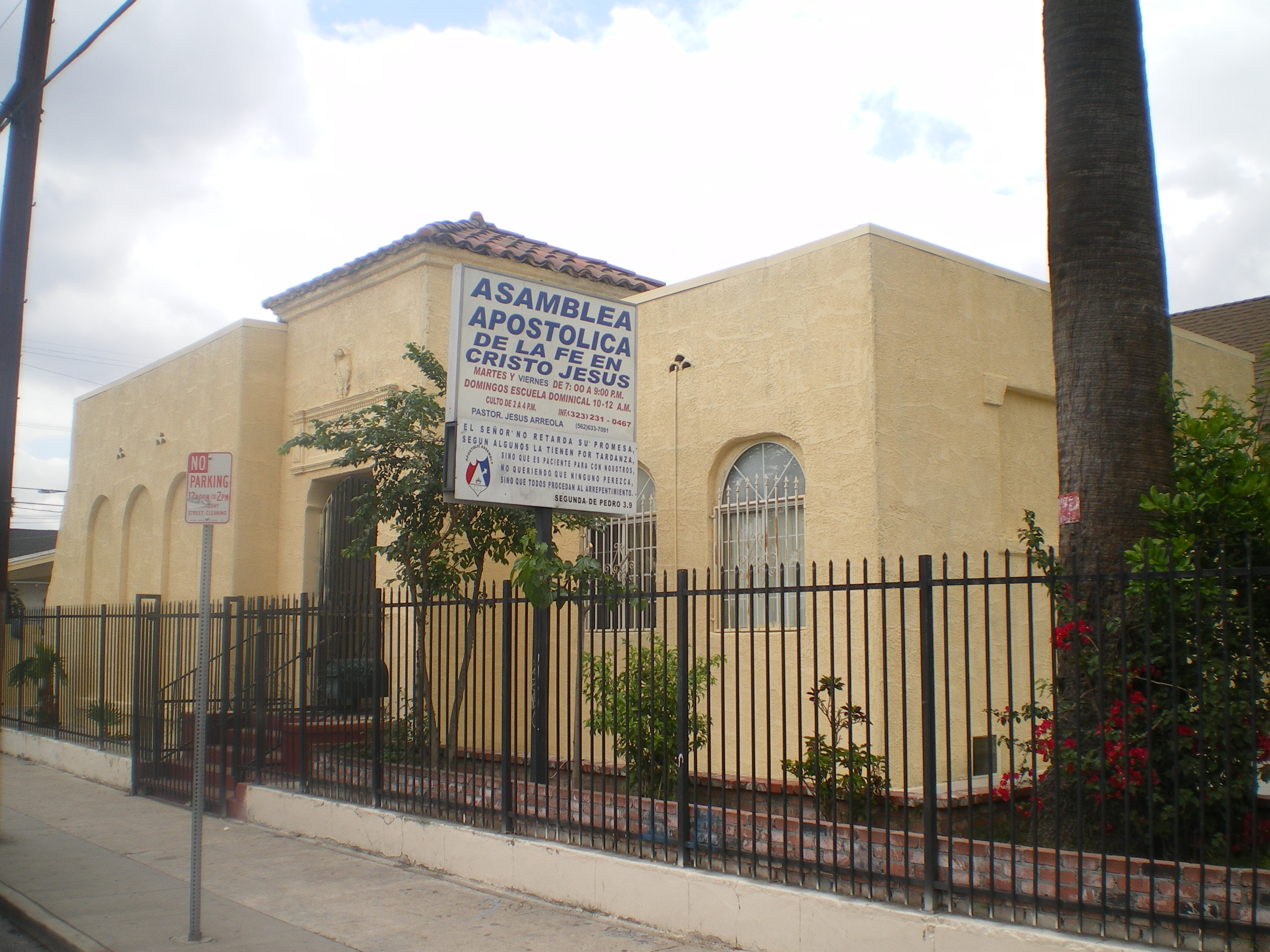
The branch has been converted into use as a church.

In 1940, the Board of Library Commissioners announced that the Helen Hunt Jackson Branch would be converted from a branch library to a station, open only 21 hours per week.

In 1987, the Helen Hunt Jackson Branch and several other branch libraries in Los Angeles were added to the National Register of Historic Places as part of a thematic group submission. The application noted that Jackson Branch was as a one-story Spanish-Mediterranean Revival style building located in a residential area. It is designed with an L-plan and features an inset tower with a hip tile roof which rises above the flat roof of the building. The recessed entry is through a tower and entrance doors are multi-paned. By the time of the application in 1987, the building had already been converted to use as a church.

As of May 2008, the building was used as a church operated by the "Asamblea Apostolica de la Fe in Cristo Jesus", as shown in the photograph above.

== See also ==
- List of Registered Historic Places in Los Angeles
- Los Angeles Public Library
