= Angelus Funeral Home =

Historic site in Los Angeles, California

- U.S. National Register of Historic Places
- Los Angeles Historic-Cultural Monument
- Location within Los Angeles Location within the Los Angeles metropolitan area Location within California Location within the United States
- Location: 1010 E Jefferson Blvd., Los Angeles, California
- Coordinates: 34°0′43″N 118°15′29″W
- Built: 1934
- Architect: Paul R. Williams
- Architectural style: Spanish Colonial Revival, Georgina Revival
- MPS: African Americans in Los Angeles
- NRHP reference No.: 09000146
- LAHCM No.: 774

Significant dates
- Added to NRHP: March 17, 2009
- Designated LAHCM: January 6, 2004

The Angelus Funeral Home is a historic funeral home building at 1010 E Jefferson Blvd in South Los Angeles, California that has been repurposed as an affordable housing complex. The building was listed as a Los Angeles Historic-Cultural Monument in 2006 and on the National Register of Historic Places in 2009.

In 1925, Angelus Funeral Home was the first Black-owned business to be incorporated in California. The building was designed by noted African-American architect Paul R. Williams in the Spanish Colonial and Georgian Revival styles and also includes Art Deco elements.

The building was deemed to satisfy the registration requirements set forth in a multiple property submission study, the African Americans in Los Angeles MPS. Other sites listed pursuant to the same MPS study include the Second Baptist Church, Lincoln Theater, 28th Street YMCA, Prince Hall Masonic Temple, 52nd Place Historic District, 27th Street Historic District, and two historic all-Black segregated fire stations (Fire Station No. 14 and Fire Station No. 30).

== See also ==
- National Register of Historic Places listings in Los Angeles, California
- List of Los Angeles Historic-Cultural Monuments in South Los Angeles
- Angelus-Rosedale Cemetery
