= Fire Station No. 30, Engine Company No. 30 =

- Fire Station No. 30–Engine Company No. 30
- U.S. National Register of Historic Places
- Los Angeles Historic-Cultural Monument
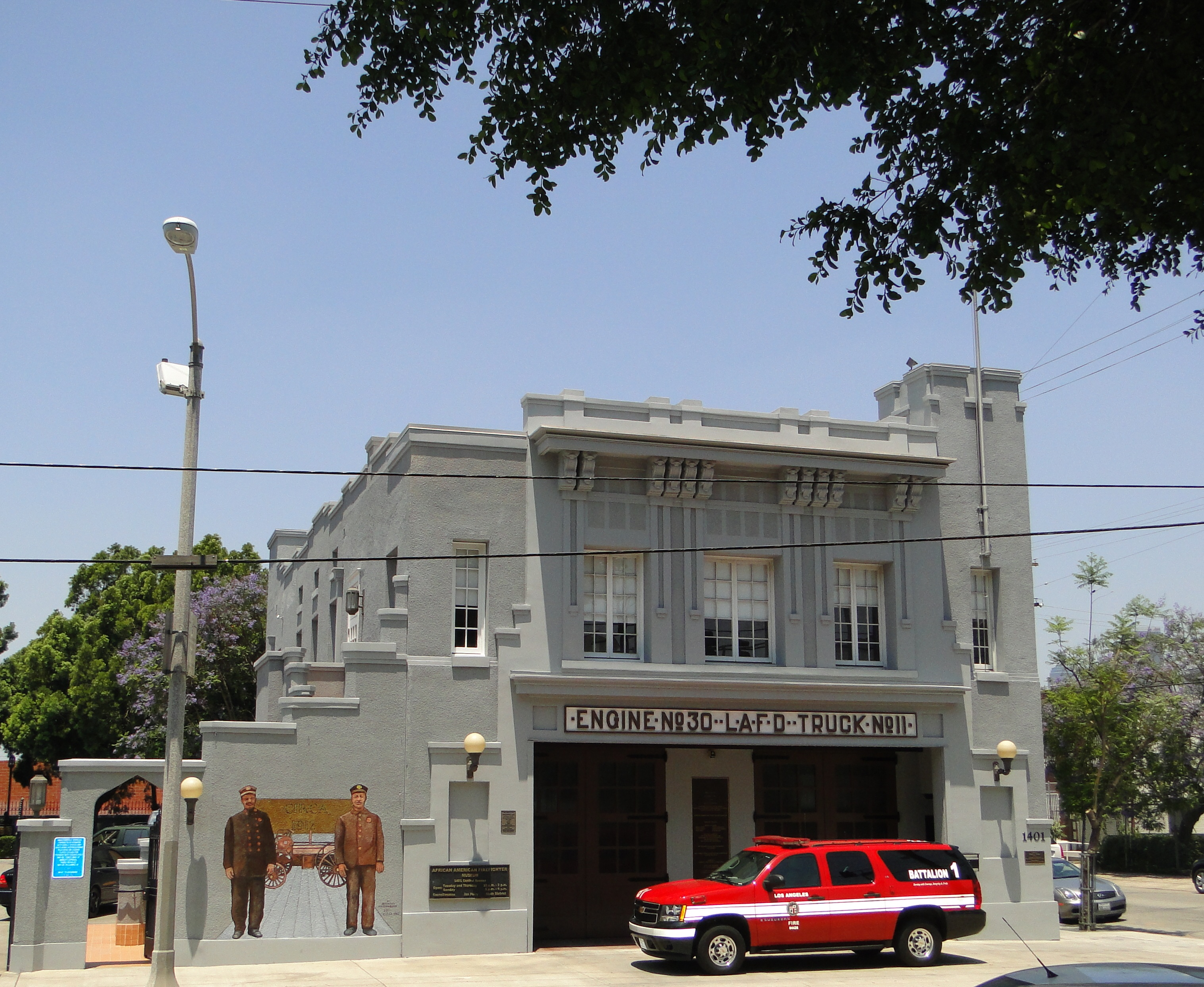
- File:Fire Station No. 30, June 2011

- Location within the Los Angeles metropolitan area Location within California Location within the United States
- Location: 1401 S. Central Ave., South Los Angeles, California
- Coordinates: 34°01′41.24″N 118°14′49.82″W
- Architect: James Backus, Superintendent of Building, City of Los Angeles
- Architectural style: Prairie School
- NRHP reference No.: 09000148
- LAHCM No.: 289

Significant dates
- Added to NRHP: March 17, 2009
- Designated LAHCM: February 15, 1985

Fire Station No. 30, Engine Company No. 30 is a historic fire station and engine company in the South Los Angeles area of Los Angeles, California. Built in 1913, its white firemen served a predominantly white neighborhood.

The demographics became more mixed in the 1920s, and in 1924 the firehouse was segregated. By 1930 the neighborhood was predominately Black. Only Black firemen served here until 1956, when the department was integrated. Now the neighborhood is predominantly Hispanic.

Closed in 1980, the building was adapted for use as the African American Firefighter Museum (AAFFM). The AAFFM features vintage fire equipment and apparatus, memorabilia, histories and photos of pioneering African-American firefighters in Los Angeles. Other displays include photos, artifacts and memorabilia of African American firefighters, officers and historical women fire service professionals from around the country. The Museum is open to the public and is strictly volunteer and donation driven.

== History ==
The two-story structure was designed in the Prairie School style and was built in 1913.

The structure was listed in the National Register of Historic Places in 2009 pursuant to the registration requirements for fire stations set forth in a multiple property submission study, the African Americans in Los Angeles MPS. It was the first of two all-Black segregated fire stations in Los Angeles. Fire Station No. 30, and its resident Engine Company No. 30, was segregated in 1924. It remained segregated until 1956, when the Los Angeles Fire Department was integrated. According to the registration form supporting the station's listing on the National Register, "All-black fire stations were simultaneous representations of racial segregation and sources of community pride."

Other buildings listed pursuant to the same African Americans in Los Angeles MPS include Fire Station No. 14 (the second all-black segregated fire station in Los Angeles), Angelus Funeral Home, Lincoln Theater, Second Baptist Church, 28th Street YMCA, Prince Hall Masonic Temple, 52nd Place Historic District, 27th Street Historic District.

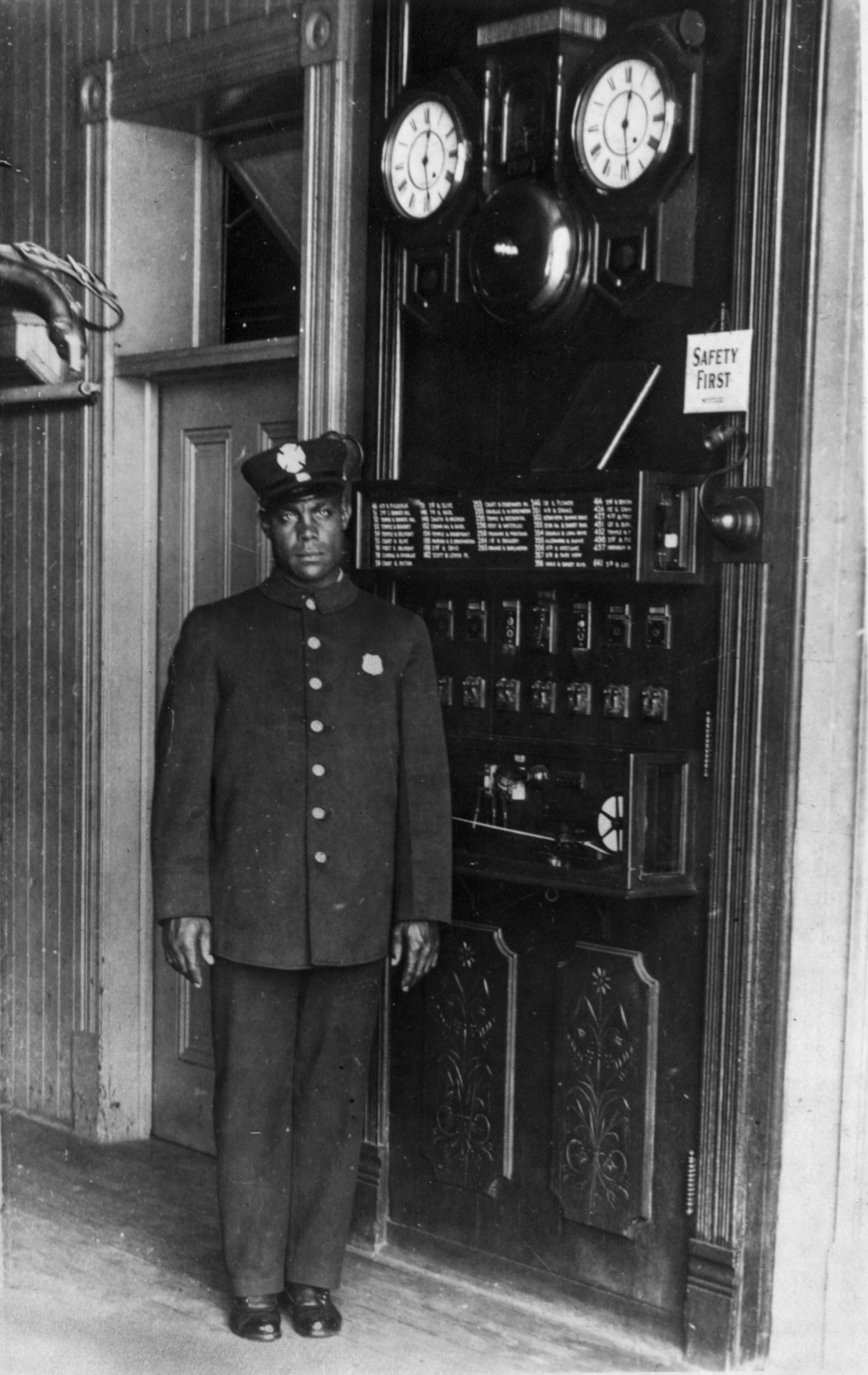
Fireman Lawrence Washington stands inside Engine Company No. 30 of the Los Angeles Fire Department, 1913

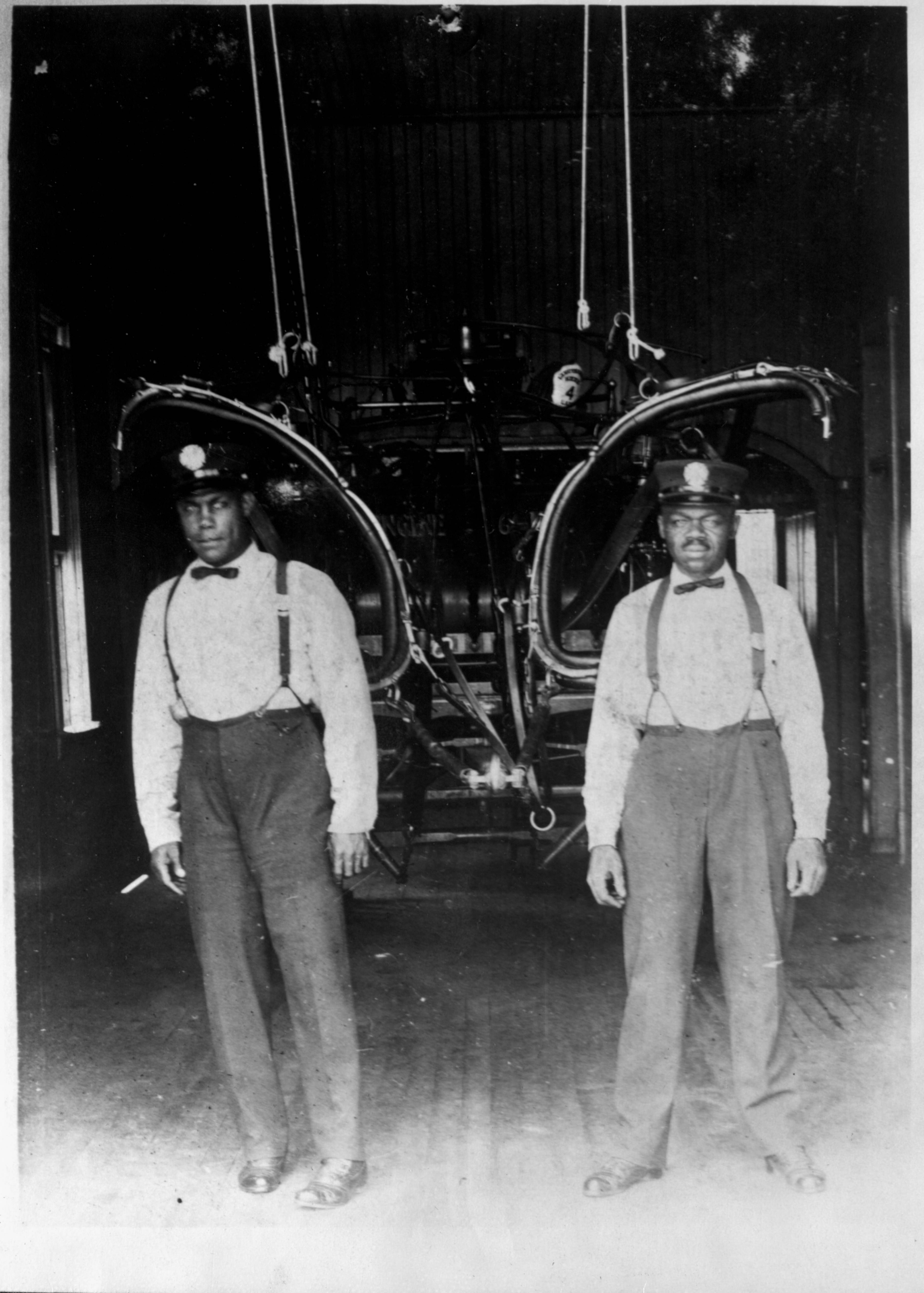
Firemen Lawrence Washington and Andrias Davis stand inside Engine Company No. 30, Los Angeles Fire Department, 1913

== See also ==
- National Register of Historic Places listings in Los Angeles, California
- Los Angeles Fire Department Museum and Memorial
- Los Angeles Fire Department
- The Stentorians
