= Lincoln Theater (Los Angeles) =

- U.S. National Register of Historic Places
- Los Angeles Historic-Cultural Monument
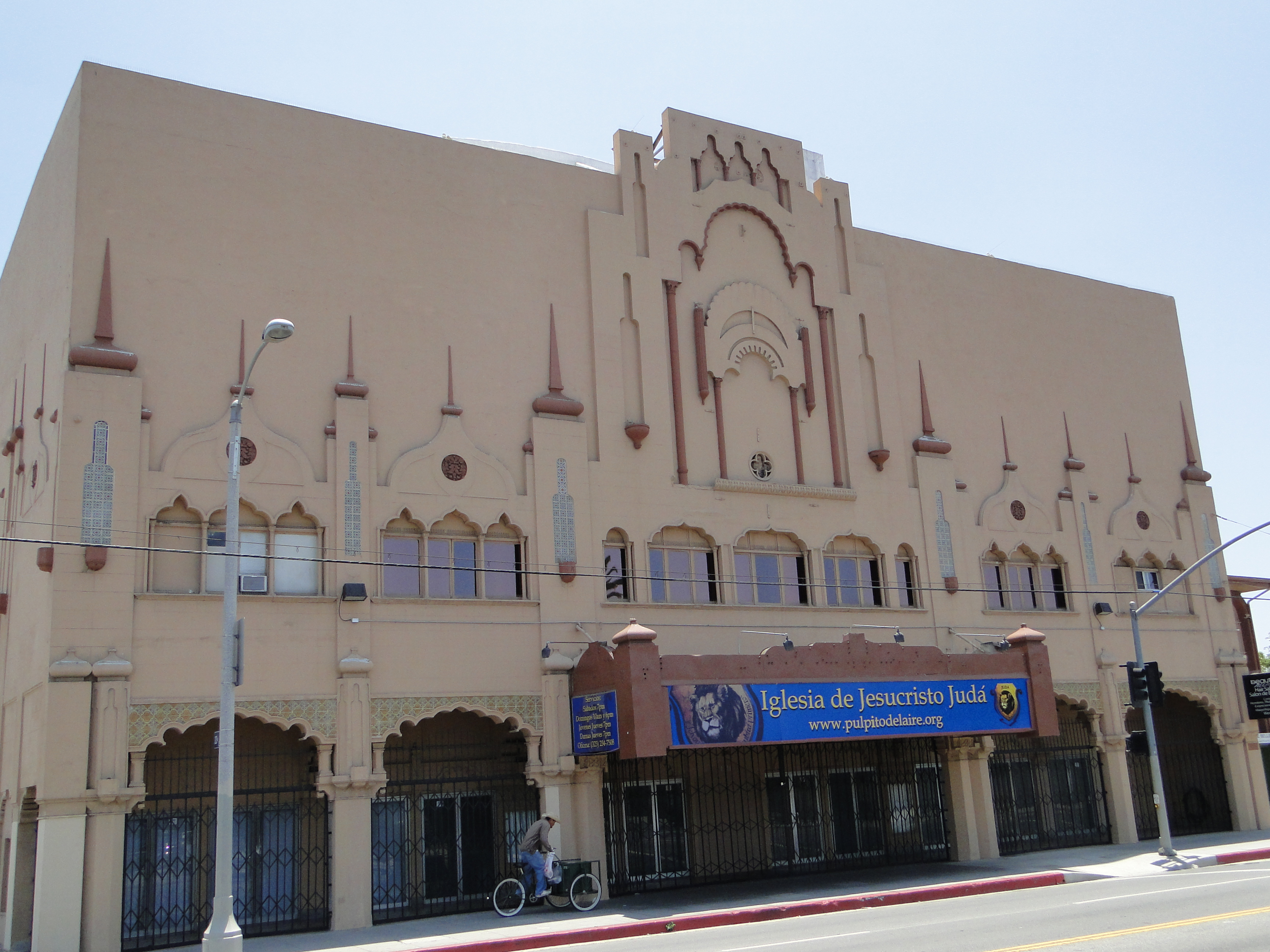
- Lincoln Theater, June 2011

- Location within Los Angeles
- Location: 2300 South Central Avenue; Los Angeles, California
- Coordinates: 34°01′13.86″N 118°15′13.72″W
- Built: 1926
- Architect: John Paxton Perrine
- Architectural style: Exotic Revival – Moorish
- NRHP reference No.: 09000149
- LAHCM No.: 744

Significant dates
- Added to NRHP: March 17, 2009
- Designated LAHCM: March 18, 2003

The Lincoln Theater is a historic theater in South Los Angeles, California. The Moorish Revival building was listed on the National Register of Historic Places in 2009. Sometimes referred to as the "West Coast Apollo", the Lincoln Theater was one of the most significant establishments along the Central Avenue Corridor; this became the cultural and business hub of the African-American community in Los Angeles from the 1920s to the 1950s. For more than 30 years, the Lincoln featured live theater, musical acts, talent shows, vaudeville, and motion pictures, including live performances by the leading African-American performers of the era, including Lionel Hampton, Duke Ellington, the Nat King Cole Trio, and Billie Holiday. The Lincoln Theater was managed and directed by Jules Wolf, grandfather of Rock & Roll Photographer, Linda Wolf, The theater was converted to use as a church in 1962. It continues to be used for religious services.

== Design and construction ==
The Lincoln Theater was built between 1926 and 1927 at a cost of $500,000. The theater was built in the style of a grand movie palace with a large stage, orchestra pit, and seating for 2,100 persons. The building was designed by architect John Paxton Perrine (1886–1972), who is known for his design of Southern California movie palaces in the 1920s. These include the California Theater (1926, San Diego), the Roosevelt Theater (1926, Hawthorne), the Fox Redondo Theater (1927, Redondo Beach), and the California Theatre (1928, San Bernardino). The Lincoln was considered by the California Eagle, "the finest and most beautiful theater in the country built exclusively for race patronage."

The Lincoln Theater is considered an outstanding example of Exotic Revival and Moorish Revival architecture. The front facade is divided into three symmetrical bays with the theater's entrance at the bottom of the central bay. The facade is marked by decorative ceramic tile above arches in the side bays and columns that are capped by onion-shaped capitals and lance-shaped spires. The area in the central bay above the marquee is decorated with layers of arches and columns that were intended to create "the overall impression of a step-back tower in low relief".

== The Central Avenue Corridor ==
In the 1910s and 1920s, large movie theaters were opened in Downtown Los Angeles in the Broadway Theater District. However, African Americans were either excluded from these theaters altogether or restricted to "colored only" seating areas.

During the 1910s and 1920s, as African-American population increased in the area, a number of cultural and business institutions catering to the African-American population of Los Angeles opened along a one-mile stretch of South Central Avenue. These included Dreamland Rink, the Murray Pocket Billiard Emporium and Cigar Stand, the 28th Street YMCA, Second Baptist Church, Sidney P. Dones Company (offering real estate, insurance and legal services), the California Eagle newspaper, the Dunbar Hotel, and the Lincoln Theater. The area, known as the Central Avenue Corridor, became the cultural and economic hub of the African-American community in Los Angeles from the 1920s through the 1950s.

The Lincoln was the largest of several theaters along the Central Avenue Corridor offering entertainment to the African-American community. Three of the others (the Tivoli, Angelus, and Hub theaters) have since been demolished. A fourth, the Globe Theater, has been substantially altered.

== Early years ==
The Lincoln Theater opened in October 1927. The "Chocolate Scandals" and Curtis Mosby's Dixieland Blue Blowers provided the entertainment at an invitation-only premiere on October 6, 1927. Though catering to the African-American community, the Lincoln became popular with the city's white audiences as well. In May 1928, Los Angeles Times columnist Lee Shippey wrote of the Lincoln:

It is a big, well-appointed theater in which all of the actors and almost all of the auditors are negroes. But many white people crowd in, too, because the chance to see negro actors of real ability appearing for their own people rather than appearing as negroes from the white man's point of view is one that doesn't come to one in every city.

The Lincoln Theater's house company, known as the Lafayette Players, attracted Hollywood celebrities, including Charlie Chaplin, Irving Thalberg, Janet Gaynor, and Fanny Brice, to performances at the Lincoln. Notable performers who appeared at the Lincoln in the late 1920s include Nina Mae McKinney (known as "The Black Garbo"), Evelyn Preer (known in the African-American community as "The First Lady of the Screen"), Clarence Muse, Elsie Ferguson, Laura Bowman, Abbie Mitchell, Charles Sidney Gilpin, and the house band, Mosby's Blue Syncopators providing "'hot' music while a chorus of twenty-four dusky beauties ... strut to its tunes."

== The "West Coast Apollo" ==
From the 1930s to the 1950s, the Lincoln featured live theater, concerts, talent shows, vaudeville, and film. One historical account noted that the Lincoln "offered stunning stage shows and packed in black audiences on Saturday and Sunday nights." The Lincoln was the site of performances by many of the leading African-American performers of the era, including Lionel Hampton, Duke Ellington, the Nat King Cole Trio, Billie Holiday, Lena Horne, Louis Jordan, Pigmeat Markham, Fats Domino, and B.B. King. The Lincoln was sometimes called the "West Coast Apollo" because it featured many of the same acts as Harlem's famous Apollo Theater.

Concerts at the Lincoln in the post-World War II era attracted diverse audiences that included the likes of choreographer Alvin Ailey, activist Eldridge Cleaver, and songwriter eden ahbez. It was outside the Lincoln in the late 1940s that a bearded ahbez wearing sandals handed the song "Nature Boy" to Nat King Cole's road manager.

== Conversion to church use ==
In 1962, the Lincoln Theater was sold to the Southern California First Jurisdiction of the Church of God in Christ. It was adapted for use and became known as "The Crouch Temple", operated by Bishop Samuel M. Crouch. The theater was later operated as the Iglesia de Cristo Ministries Juda.

In 2009, the theater was deemed to satisfy the registration requirements set forth in a multiple property submission study, the African Americans in Los Angeles MPS. Other sites listed on the National Register of Historic Places in 2009 pursuant to the same African Americans in Los Angeles MPS include the Second Baptist Church, 28th Street YMCA, Prince Hall Masonic Temple, Angelus Funeral Home, 52nd Place Historic District, 27th Street Historic District, and two historic all-black segregated fire stations (Fire Station No. 14 and Fire Station No. 30).

== Significance ==
The Lincoln Theater qualifies for inclusion in the National Register under Criterion A due to its connection to significant historical events. It fulfills the criteria outlined in the Multiple Property Documentation (MPD) Form for Historic Resources Linked with African Americans in Los Angeles. The theater holds local significance within the context of entertainment and culture. Since 1962, it has been owned and operated by a religious institution, meeting Criteria Consideration A by deriving its primary significance from its historical importance to the African American community.

These theaters not only highlighted African American performers but also served as entertainment venues free from racial discrimination for the local community. African Americans were often excluded from downtown Los Angeles theaters or confined to segregated "colored only" seating areas. Consequently, theaters offering equal access to African Americans became one of the many businesses that emerged along Central Avenue. Among these were at least five theaters: the Lincoln, Globe, Tivoli, Angelus, and Hub, with the Lincoln Theater being the largest.

The Lincoln Theater opened in 1927 and quickly became a major gathering place for the growing African American population along the Central Avenue corridor. It was built by West Coast Theaters, with a board of directors that included Mike Gore, Adolph Ramish, Sol Lesser, and Joseph Schenk. The theater hosted a variety of stage shows, plays, concerts, talent shows, vaudeville, and films. It was often referred to as the "West Coast Apollo" due to its lineup featuring many of the same acts as the Apollo Theater in Harlem. The theater played a key role in jazz history, showcasing performers such as Lionel Hampton, Duke Ellington, Nat Cole, Fats Domino, Sammy Davis Jr., and BB King.

A columnist from the Los Angeles Times observed that many white patrons attended the Lincoln Theater because it provided a rare opportunity to see Black actors perform authentically for their own community, rather than through the lens of stereotypes often presented in mainstream venues.

One of the theater’s main draws was the Lafayette Players. Founded in 1915 by Anita Busch, the Lafayette Players provided dramatic entertainment for the Harlem community, offering an alternative to minstrel shows that often demeaned black people. In 1928, they relocated to Los Angeles and became the resident company at the Lincoln. The troupe featured renowned black actors such as Clarence Muse, Charles Gilpin, and Abbie Mitchell.

In 1962, the Lincoln Theater was acquired by the First Jurisdiction of the Church of God in Christ and was renamed "The Crouch Temple" by Bishop Samuel M. Crouch. After Crouch’s death in 1976, the headquarters moved to Crenshaw. The Lincoln Theater is now co-owned by the Mission Evangelica Juda and serves as a church under the leadership of Pastor Alberto Wizel with Iglesia de Cristo Ministeries Juda.

Though the building is not being nominated under Criterion C, it is noteworthy that it was designed by architect John Paxton Perrine, who had an extensive body of work in southern California. Perrine was recognized for his grand theater designs in Art Deco, Spanish Colonial Revival, and Moorish Revival styles. In 1928, he designed the lavish California Theater in San Bernardino, blending Spanish Colonial and Moorish Revival styles. Built to host both vaudeville acts and motion pictures, it was the site of Will Rogers’ final public appearance in 1935.

== See also ==
- National Register of Historic Places listings in Los Angeles, California
- List of Los Angeles Historic-Cultural Monuments in South Los Angeles
