= 27th Street Historic District =

Historic district in California, United States

- U.S. National Register of Historic Places
- U.S. Historic district
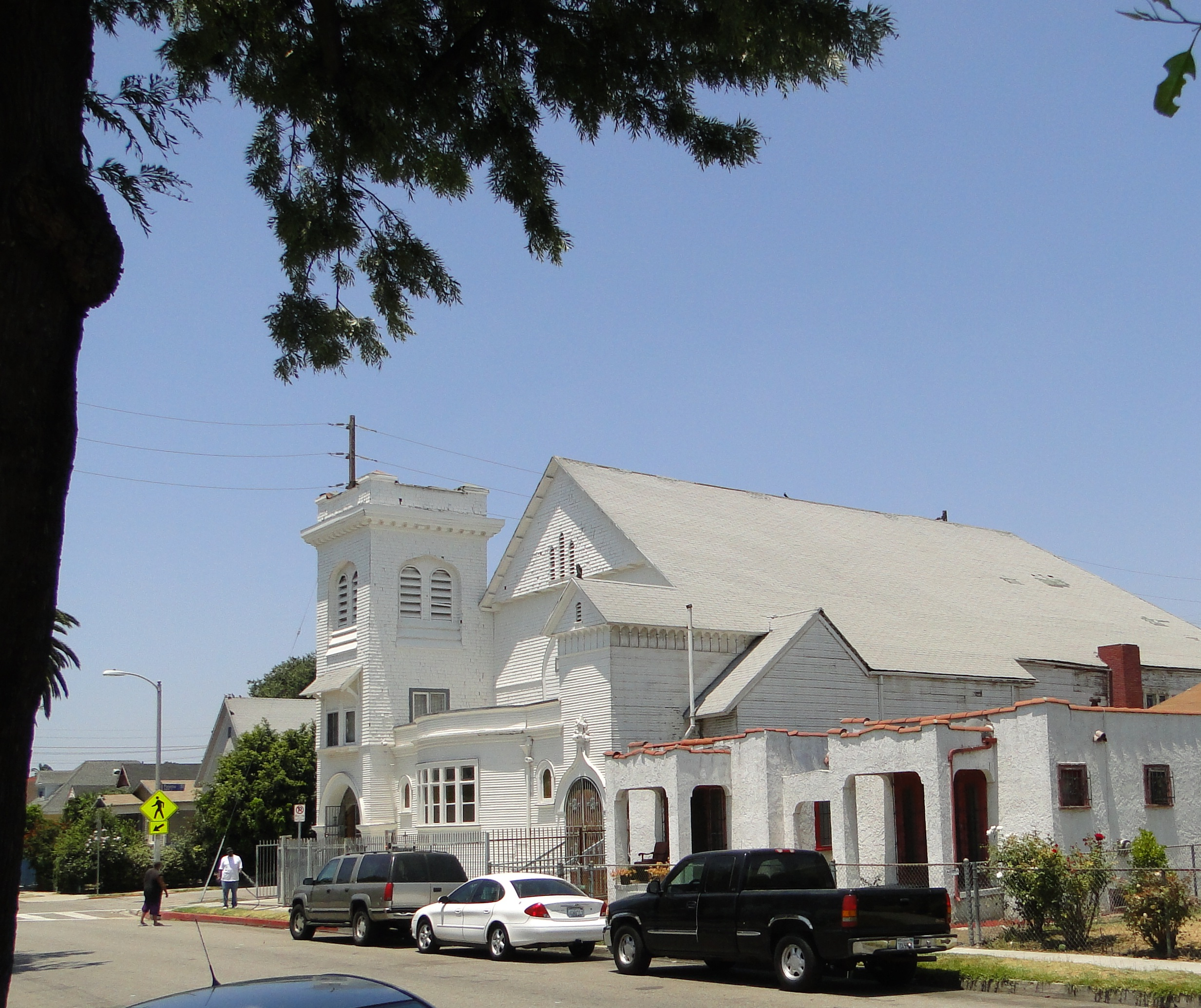
- Crouch Memorial Church in 27th Street Historic District

- Location within the Los Angeles metropolitan area Location within California Location within the United States
- Location: 900–1030 E. 27th St., 1001–1036 E. 28th St., 1001 E. 29th St., Los Angeles, California
- Coordinates: 34°1′6″N 118°15′25″W
- Architectural style: Various
- MPS: African Americans in Los Angeles
- NRHP reference No.: 09000399
- Added to NRHP: June 11, 2009

The 27th Street Historic District is a historic district in the South Los Angeles area of Los Angeles, California. The district was listed on the National Register of Historic Places in 2009 as part of the multiple property submission for African Americans in Los Angeles.

== Location and buildings ==
The 27th Street Historic District is centered on the intersection of East 27th Street and Paloma Avenue, one block to the west of Central Avenue. The district contains 43 contributing buildings and 13 non-contributing buildings. It extends south along Paloma Avenue to East 29th Street.

=== Residential buildings ===
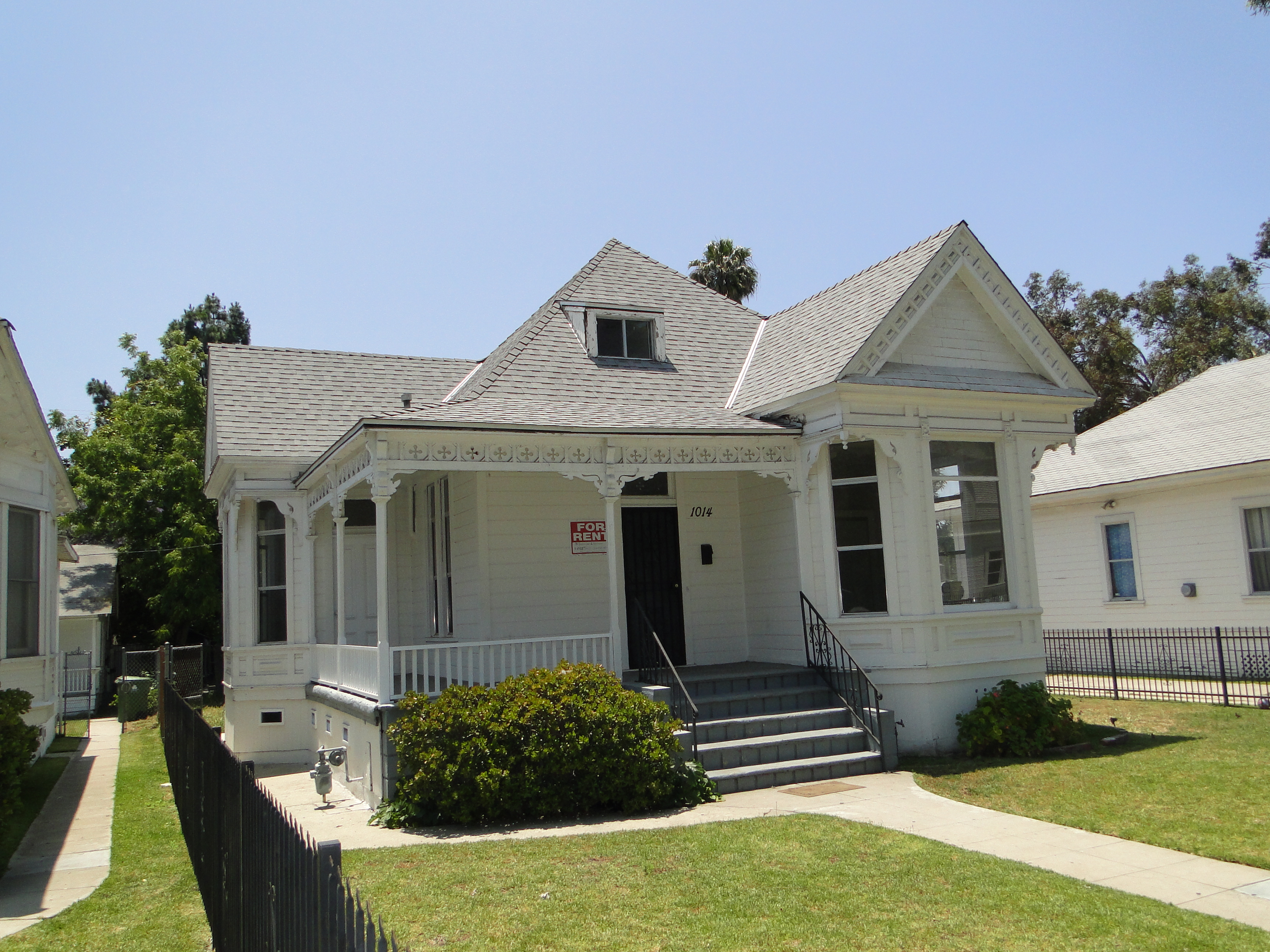
Queen Anne style home at 1014 E. 27th St.

The vast majority of the contributing buildings are private residences, including many Victorian Queen Anne style houses dating from the 1890s and 1900s. Other contributing buildings in the district include homes in the Colonial Revival and Transitional Craftsman styles. The districts notable residential structures include the following:

- 901 E. 27th Street – Victorian Queen Anne style house constructed in 1895
- 909 E. 27th Street – Victorian Queen Anne style house constructed in 1895
- 912 E. 27th Street – Victorian Queen Anne style house constructed in 1895
- 913–915 E. 27th Street – Colonial Revival style duplex constructed in 1922
- 920 E. 27th Street – Transitional Craftsman style house constructed in 1905
- 921 E. 27th Street - Victorian Queen Anne style house constructed in 1895
- 925 E. 27th Street – Colonial Revival style house constructed in 1895
- 1002 E. 27th Street – Victorian Queen Anne style house constructed in 1895
- 1008 E. 27th Street – One-story turn-of-the-century cottage built in 1901
- 1014 E. 27th Street – Victorian Queen Anne style house constructed in 1895
- 1017 E. 27th Street – Cottage with Victorian detailing constructed in 1895
- 1020 E. 27th Street – Victorian Queen Anne style house constructed in 1915
- 1023 E. 27th Street – Cottage with Victorian detailing constructed in 1898
- 1013 E. 28th Street – Transitional Craftsman style house constructed in 1912
- 1014 E. 28th Street – Victorian Queen Anne style house constructed in 1893
- 1001 E. 29th Street – American Foursquare style home constructed in 1895

=== Institutional buildings ===
The district also includes two extant church buildings, now known as the Crouch Memorial Church of God and Christ and the Nueva Iglesia Bautista en Cristo, and a historically significant YMCA building. As noted in the registration form supporting the inclusion of the two church buildings as contributing structures in the historic district, the two extant church buildings "are typical of those along the Central Avenue corridor in that they have been occupied by several congregations, reflecting the changing demographics of the neighborhood."

==== Crouch Memorial Church ====
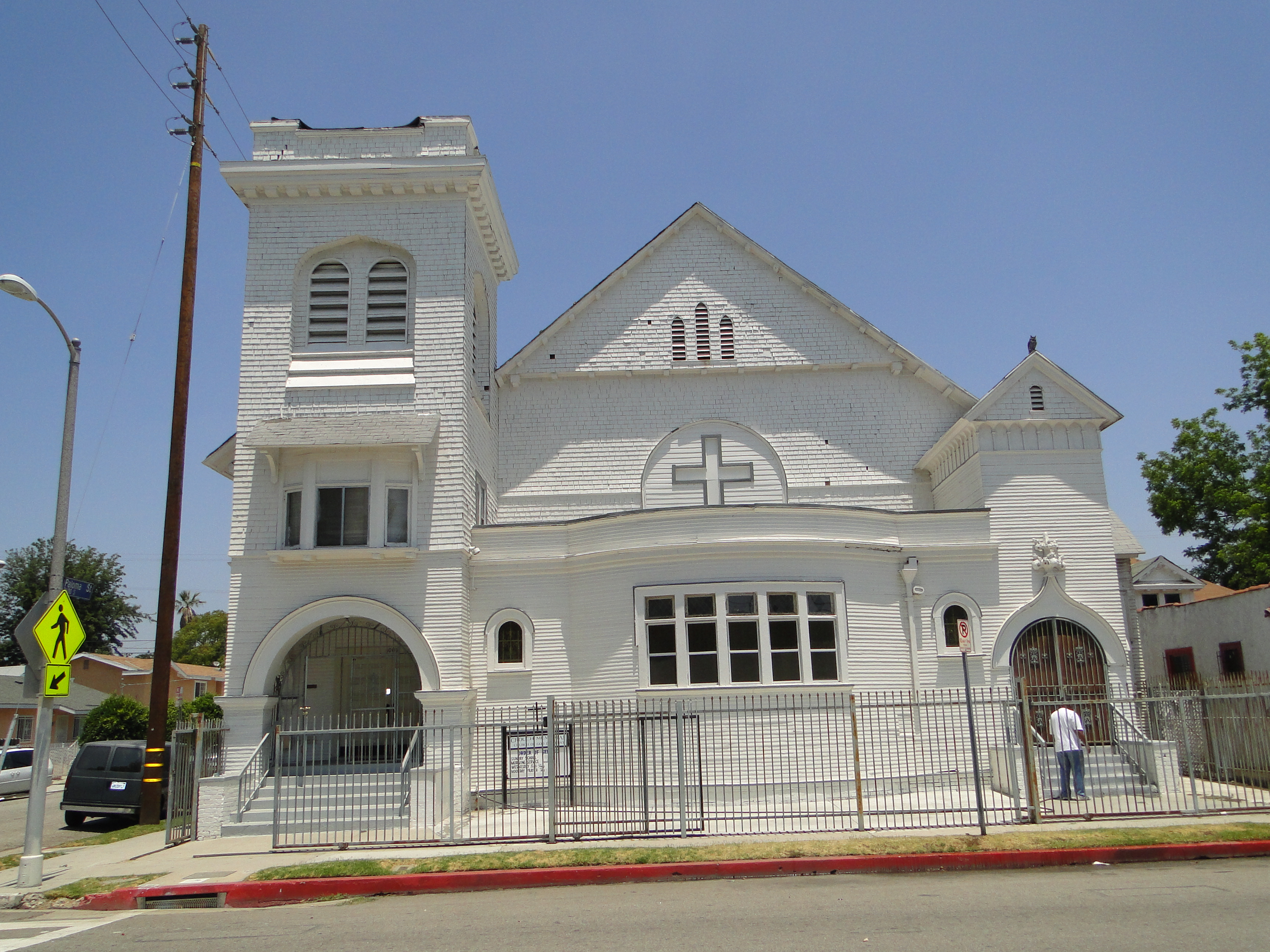
Church at 1001 E. 27th St.

The 27th Street Historic District includes the Crouch Memorial Church of God and Christ, a Romanesque Revival style church located at the northeast corner of E. 27th Street and Paloma Avenue. It was built from 1895 to 1896 for the Haven Methodist Episcopal Church. In the early 1900s, the church was a center of the city's prohibition movement. In October 1902, the church hosted a speech by a member of the Anti-Saloon League. In July and November 1902, the church was the site of all-day meetings of the city's federation of Women's Christian Temperance Unions. One of the members gave a talk on the effect of the corset on the body, asserting that "good men will not select the girl with a wasp-like waist for a wife and as a mother to his children." The Haven Methodist congregation celebrated 20 years on the site in September 1915 with anniversary and homecoming services. In the early 1920s, as the demographics of the neighborhood changed, the Haven Methodist congregation moved to a new location on South Normandie, and the church building at 21st and Paloma was sold to the Beth Eden Baptist Temple, an African-American congregation. In August 1925, the 34th annual convention of the Western Baptist Association drew several hundred delegates from 48 "colored Baptist churches" in Southern California to Beth Eden. In July 1927, the relocated Haven Methodist congregation became the first church in Los Angeles to file a bankruptcy petition. The Los Angeles Times reported that the congregation had been divided by ultra-modernism and "circus ballyhoo" methods. The church has been affiliated with the Church of God in Christ as Crouch Memorial Church since about 1950.

On the morning of October 8, 2013, a fire started from a wall heater in the Mother L. O. Hale Prayer Room and quickly spread up the wall and into the attic. By the time the fire was extinguished the ceiling and the roof were completely destroyed, but the exterior walls and the floor remained standing. The national headquarters of the Church of God in Christ instructed the congregations that the church should be restored. After an engineering assessment was completed it was determined by the HPOZ Planning Department that there was enough left to restore the building. Plans to restore the Historic church are in the hands of the Los Angeles City Planning Department and the approval process is in the final stage to restore the building to its original architecture.

==== Nueva Iglesia Bautista en Cristo ====
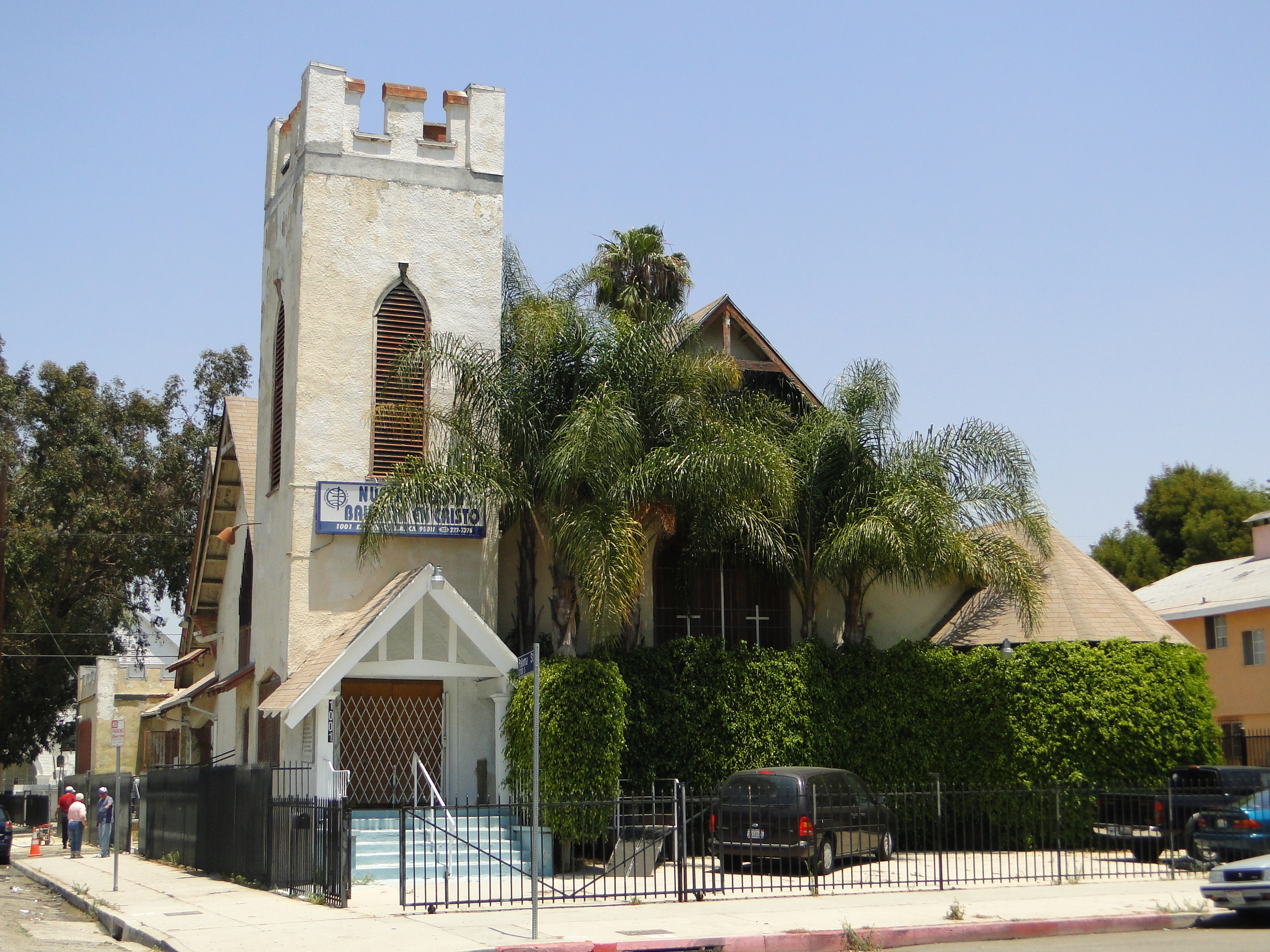
Since 1906, the Gothic Revival church at 1001 E. 28th Street has served white, Armenian, African-American, and Hispanic congregations.

The second contributing church building in the district is now known as the Nueva Iglesia Bautista en Cristo, a Gothic Revival structure located at the northeast corner of East 28th Street and Paloma Avenue. The structure was built in 1906 for the Salem Congregational Church, a congregation serving the white population that initially settled in the neighborhood. The church as dedicated in May 1906 with seating for 1,000 persons and, according to the Los Angeles Times, "everything being modern and up-to-date." In 1911, the Salem Congregational Church successfully lobbied for an ordinance permitting the display of "moving pictures" in churches after the pastor, Rev. B. H. Reutepohler, hit upon a play to illustrate his Sunday evening sermons with motion pictures. After the ordinance passed, Salem Congregational became the first church in Los Angeles to take advantage of the new law. The church building was purchased in January 1917 by a group of Armenian Congregationalists and was renamed the Armenian Gethsemane Congregational Church. From 1917 to 1944, the church served the influx of Armenian immigrants in the area. In October 1942, the church hosted the 56th Annual Convention of the Los Angeles Association of Congregational Churches. In 1944, the church building was sold to an African-American congregation and was renamed the E. 28th Street Christian Church. Since 2003, the church building is operated as a Spanish-language church, the Nueva Iglesia Bautista en Cristo, serving the neighborhood's Hispanic population.

==== 28th Street YMCA ====
The 28th Street YMCA, listed separately on the National Register of Historic Places, also lies within the borders of the 27th Street Historic District. The YMCA building, sometimes referred to in its early years as the "Colored YMCA", was built in 1926 based on a design by the African American architect Paul R. Williams. The YMCA provided a swimming pool for use by the African American community in an era when the city's public swimming pools were racially segregated.

== Historic significance ==
The 27th Street Historic District was listed on the National Register of Historic Places in 2009 pursuant to the registration requirements for residential districts set forth in a multiple property submission study, the African Americans in Los Angeles MPS. The neighborhood was originally occupied exclusively by white residents. Its period of historical significance begins in 1923, when an African-American congregation acquired the church at the corner of East 27th Street and Paloma Avenue, and as African-Americans began to move into the neighborhood and build important cultural and business institutions along the nearby Central Avenue Corridor. The district represents "one of the few neighborhoods along the Central Avenue corridor to retain sufficient integrity for listing in the National Register."

The Central Avenue Corridor became the cultural and business hub of the African-American community in Los Angeles from the 1920s to the 1950s. Other buildings along this corridor which were listed pursuant to the African Americans in Los Angeles MPS include the Lincoln Theater (located a short walk from the district on Central Avenue), Second Baptist Church (located four blocks north of the district along Griffith Avenue), Prince Hall Masonic Temple, 52nd Place Historic District, and two historic all-black segregated fire stations (Fire Station No. 14 and Fire Station No. 30).

== Gallery ==
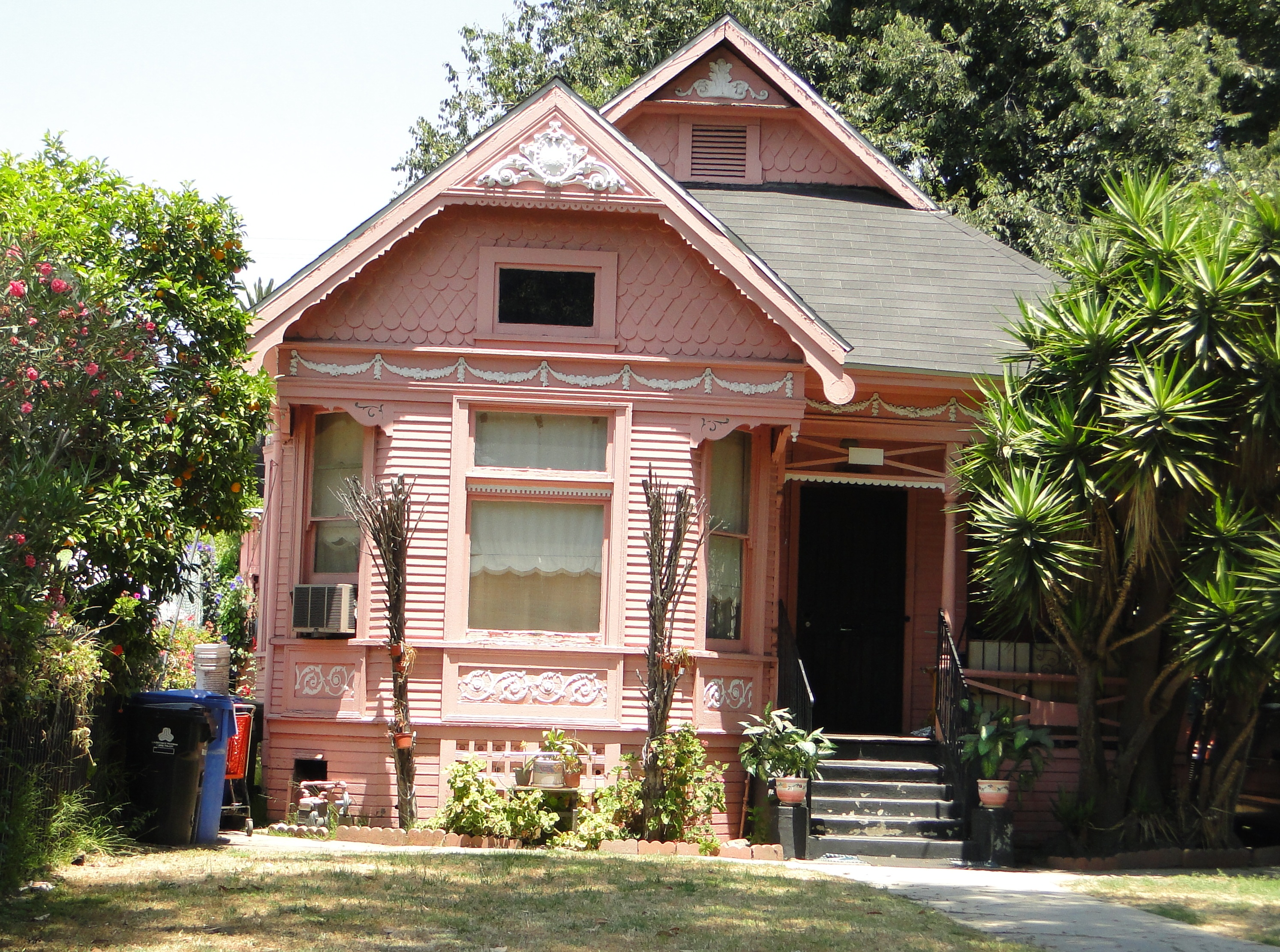
921 E. 27th St.

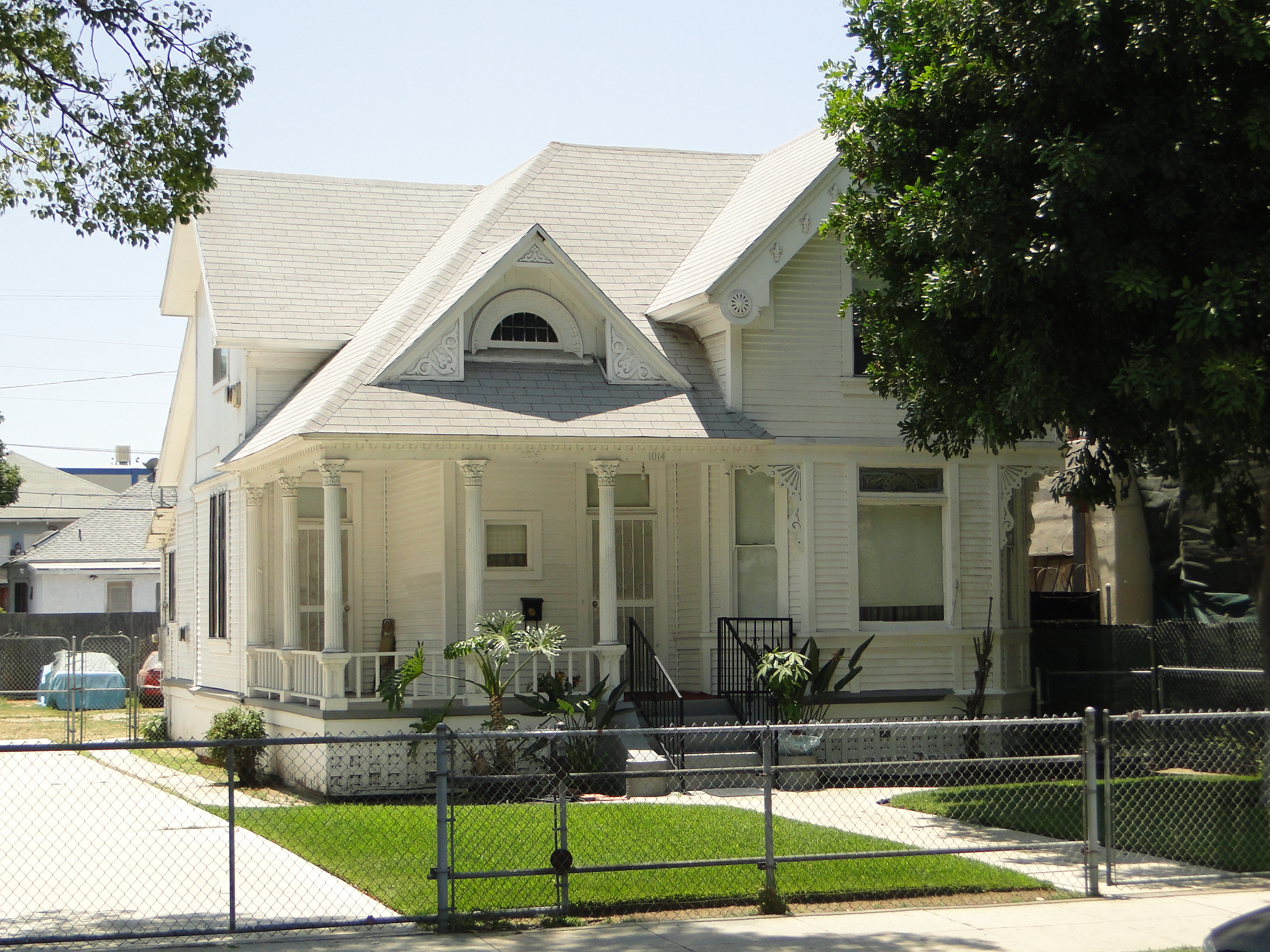
1014 E. 28th St.

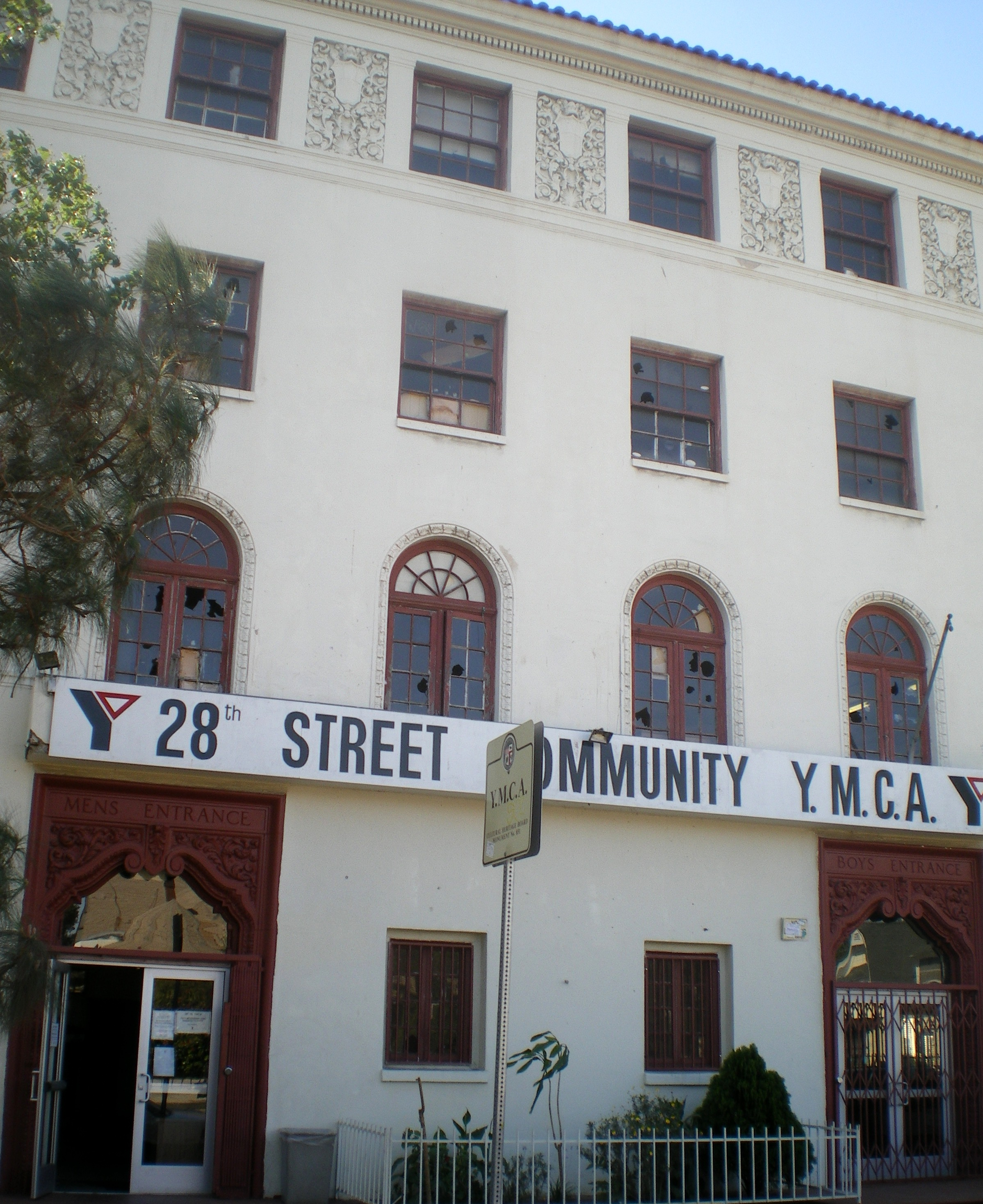
28th Street YMCA

== See also ==
- National Register of Historic Places listings in Los Angeles, California
- List of Los Angeles Historic-Cultural Monuments in South Los Angeles
- The Stentorians
