= 52nd Place Historic District =

Historic district in California, United States

- U.S. National Register of Historic Places
- U.S. Historic district
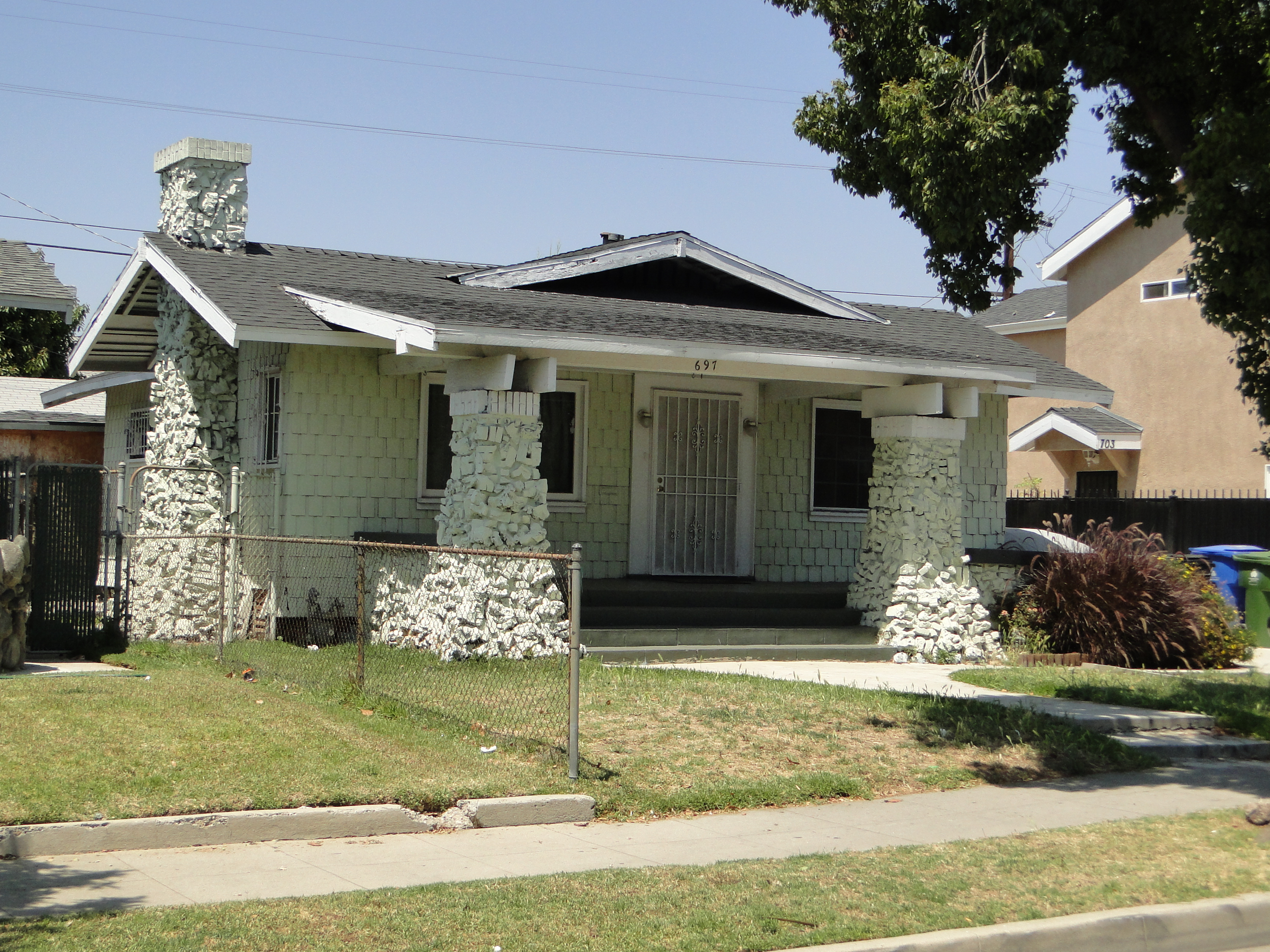
- Charlotta Bass House, 697 E. 52nd Place

- Location within the Los Angeles metropolitan area Location within California Location within the United States
- Location: 639 to 780 E. 52nd Place (between McKinley Avenue on the east and Avalon Boulevard on the west), South Los Angeles, Los Angeles, California
- Coordinates: 33°59′41″N 118°15′46″W
- Architectural style: American Craftsman
- MPS: African Americans in Los Angeles
- NRHP reference No.: 09000398
- Added to NRHP: June 11, 2009

The 52nd Place Historic District is a historic district consisting of American Craftsman-style homes in South Los Angeles, California. African Americans became the dominant demographic group in the district beginning around 1930, and many leaders of the community resided here. The period of significance is 1930-1958, when a number of African-American neighborhood institutions were founded.

The district has been defined as including 37 contributing buildings and seven non-contributing buildings. The contributing buildings are one-story Craftsman houses designed and built by Tifal brothers between 1911 and 1914. The characteristic feature of the contributing buildings include "low-pitched gabled roofs with overhanging eaves and exposed rafter tails, front porches and chimneys made of brick or river rock, and multi-paned wood-framed casement windows." The district is located on 52nd Place between McKinley Avenue on the east and Avalon Boulevard on the west and lies just east of the South Park neighborhood.

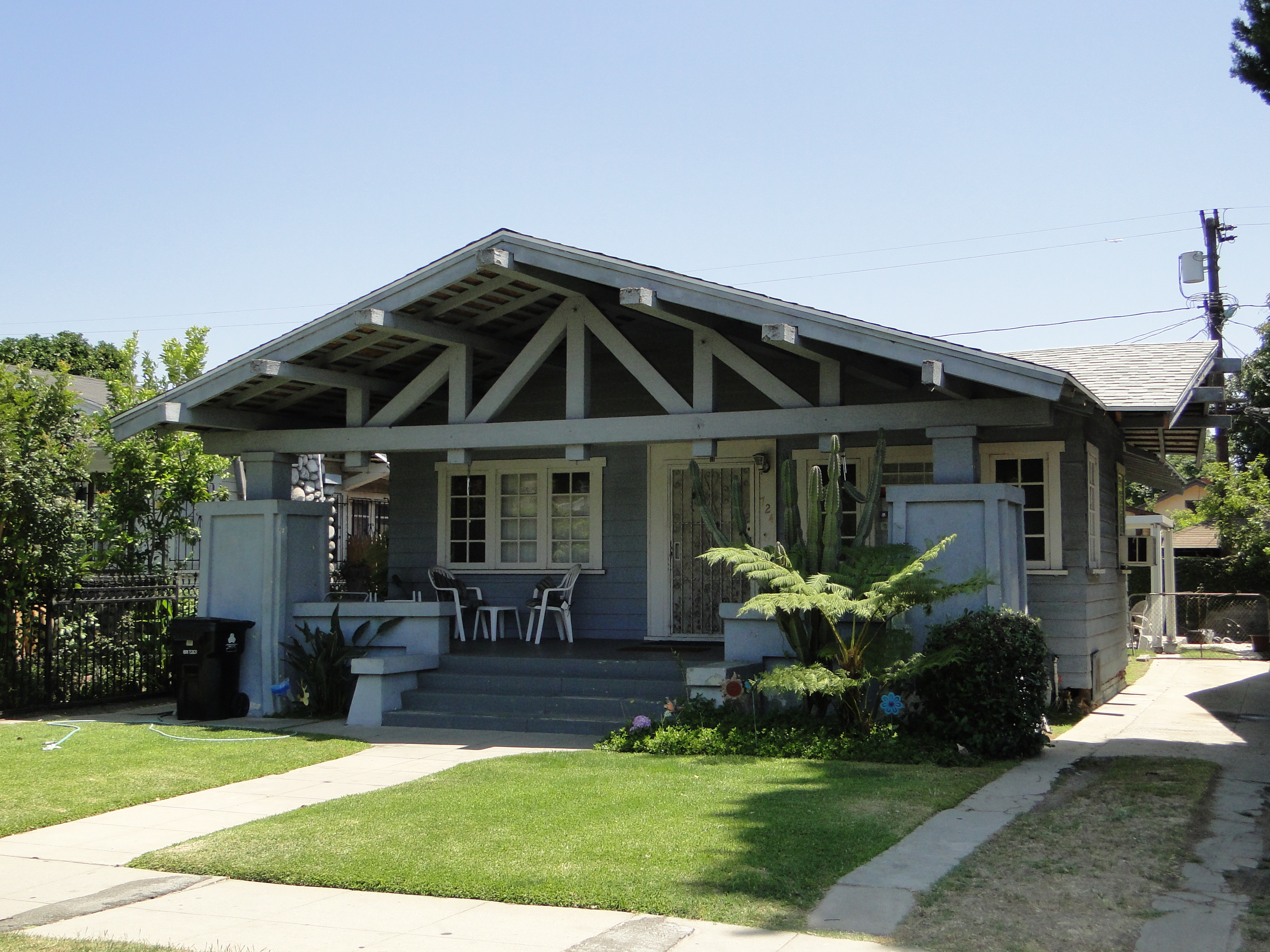
Duke Ellington's singer Ivie Anderson's house

The district was listed on the National Register of Historic Places in 2009 pursuant to the registration requirements for residential districts set forth in a multiple property submission study, the African Americans in Los Angeles MPS. When first built, the district had all white residents. During the early 20th century, numerous African Americans began moving to California as part of the Great Migration. By 1930 African Americans had become the dominant demographic group in the district. The district is also significant for its association with important African-American figures who lived in this area during its period of significance.

For instance, singer Ivie Anderson lived at 724 E. 52nd Place from 1930 until 1945. Anderson performed with Duke Ellington's band from 1931 to 1942 and recorded the vocals on several hit recordings, including "It Don't Mean a Thing (If It Ain't Got That Swing)" (1932), "Stormy Weather" (1933), "Rose of the Rio Grande" (1938), and "I Got It Bad and That Ain't Good" (1941). Civil rights activists and journalists, Joseph and Charlotta Bass, lived at 697 E. 52nd Place in the 1930s. Charlotta Bass owned and operated the California Eagle, the largest African-American newspaper on the West Coast, from 1912 to 1951.

Other contributing buildings listed in the district are the Angelus Funeral Home, Lincoln Theater, Second Baptist Church, 28th Street YMCA, Prince Hall Masonic Temple, 27th Street Historic District, and two historic all-black segregated fire stations (Fire Station No. 14 and Fire Station No. 30).

== See also ==
- National Register of Historic Places listings in Los Angeles, California
- The Stentorians
