= Prince Hall Masonic Temple (Los Angeles, California) =

- U.S. National Register of Historic Places
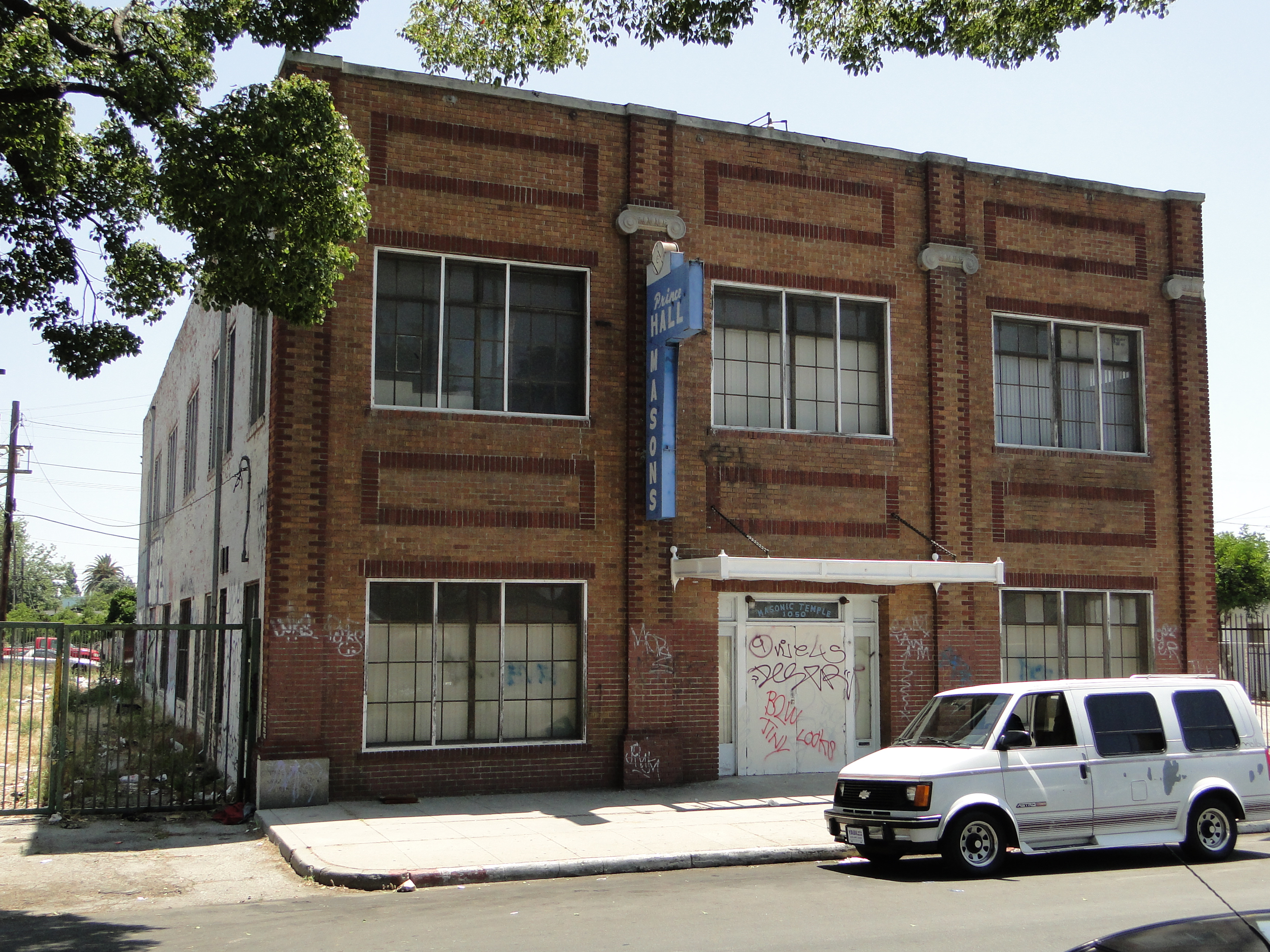
- Prince Hall Masonic Temple, June 2011

- Location within the Los Angeles metropolitan area Location within California Location within the United States
- Location: 1050 E. 50th St., South Los Angeles, Los Angeles, California
- Coordinates: 33°59′50.53″N 118°15′26″W
- Architectural style: Late 19th & Early 20th Century American Movements - Commercial Style
- NRHP reference No.: 09000150
- Added to NRHP: March 17, 2009

The Prince Hall Masonic Temple is a historic club building associated with Prince Hall Freemasonry. It is located in South Los Angeles area of Los Angeles, California. As a contributing building within the 52nd Place Historic District, it was listed on the National Register of Historic Places in 2009.

The Prince Hall Masonic Temple was built in 1926. It is a two-story masonry building which has been described as "very simple in design and almost appears to be commercial in use." The building was established as the Los Angeles branch of Prince Hall Freemasonry, a tradition of separate, predominantly African-American, Freemasonry in North America.

The building was deemed to satisfy the registration requirement for club buildings. It was set forth in a multiple property submission study, the African Americans in Los Angeles MPS. The building was deemed significant as one of two remaining Los Angeles club buildings founded by and for African Americans.

Other sites listed pursuant to the same African Americans in Los Angeles MPS include the Angelus Funeral Home, Lincoln Theater, Second Baptist Church, 28th Street YMCA, 52nd Place Historic District, 27th Street Historic District, and two historic all-black segregated fire stations (Fire Station No. 14 and Fire Station No. 30).
