= 28th Street YMCA =

Building in Los Angeles, California

- U.S. National Register of Historic Places
- Los Angeles Historic-Cultural Monument
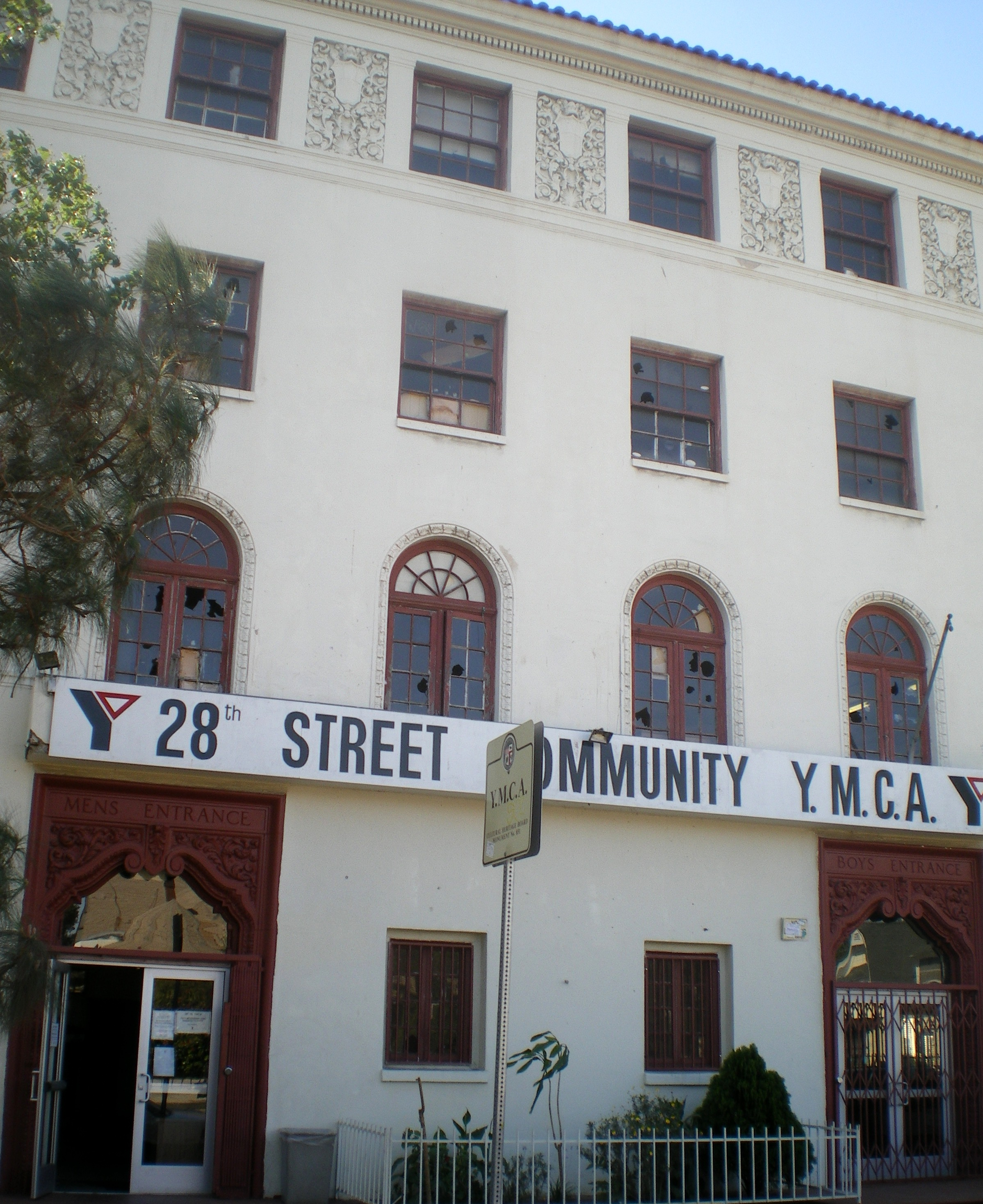
- 28th Street YMCA, October 2008

- Location within the Los Angeles metropolitan area Location within California Location within the United States
- Location: 1006 East 28th Street, Los Angeles, California
- Coordinates: 34°01′01″N 118°15′26″W
- Built: 1926
- Architect: Paul R. Williams, Norman F. Marsh
- Architectural style: Spanish Colonial Revival
- MPS: African Americans in Los Angeles
- NRHP reference No.: 09000145
- LAHCM No.: 851

Significant dates
- Added to NRHP: March 17, 2009
- Designated LAHCM: September 27, 2006

The 28th Street YMCA is a historic YMCA building in South Los Angeles, California. It was listed as a Los Angeles Historic-Cultural Monument in 2006 and put on the National Register of Historic Places in 2009. The four-story structure was built in 1926 at a cost of $200,000. The building was designed by noted African American architect Paul R. Williams in the Spanish Colonial Revival style.

The building is considered to be historically significant because of its association with Paul R. Williams and because it is one of two club buildings remaining in Los Angeles that were founded by and for African Americans. The 28th Street YMCA, also sometimes referred to as the "Colored YMCA", was a milestone for the city's African American community. Many recreational facilities, including public swimming pools, were racially segregated in the 1920s, and the 28th Street YMCA provided a gymnasium, swimming pool, and 52 dormitory rooms on the upper floors.

The building was deemed to satisfy the registration requirement for club buildings set forth in a multiple property submission study, the African Americans in Los Angeles MPS. Other sites listed pursuant to the same African Americans in Los Angeles MPS include the Angelus Funeral Home, Lincoln Theater, Second Baptist Church, Prince Hall Masonic Temple, 52nd Place Historic District, 27th Street Historic District, and two historic all-black segregated fire stations (Fire Station No. 14 and Fire Station No. 30).

In 2015 a major restoration was undertaken by non profit affordable housing developer Clifford Beers Housing and the Coalition for Responsible Community Development with design work led by the architecture firm Koning Eizenberg. The project was awarded a 2015 National AIA Honor Award for Architecture

== See also ==
- National Register of Historic Places listings in Los Angeles, California
- List of Los Angeles Historic-Cultural Monuments in South Los Angeles
