= Second Baptist Church (Los Angeles) =

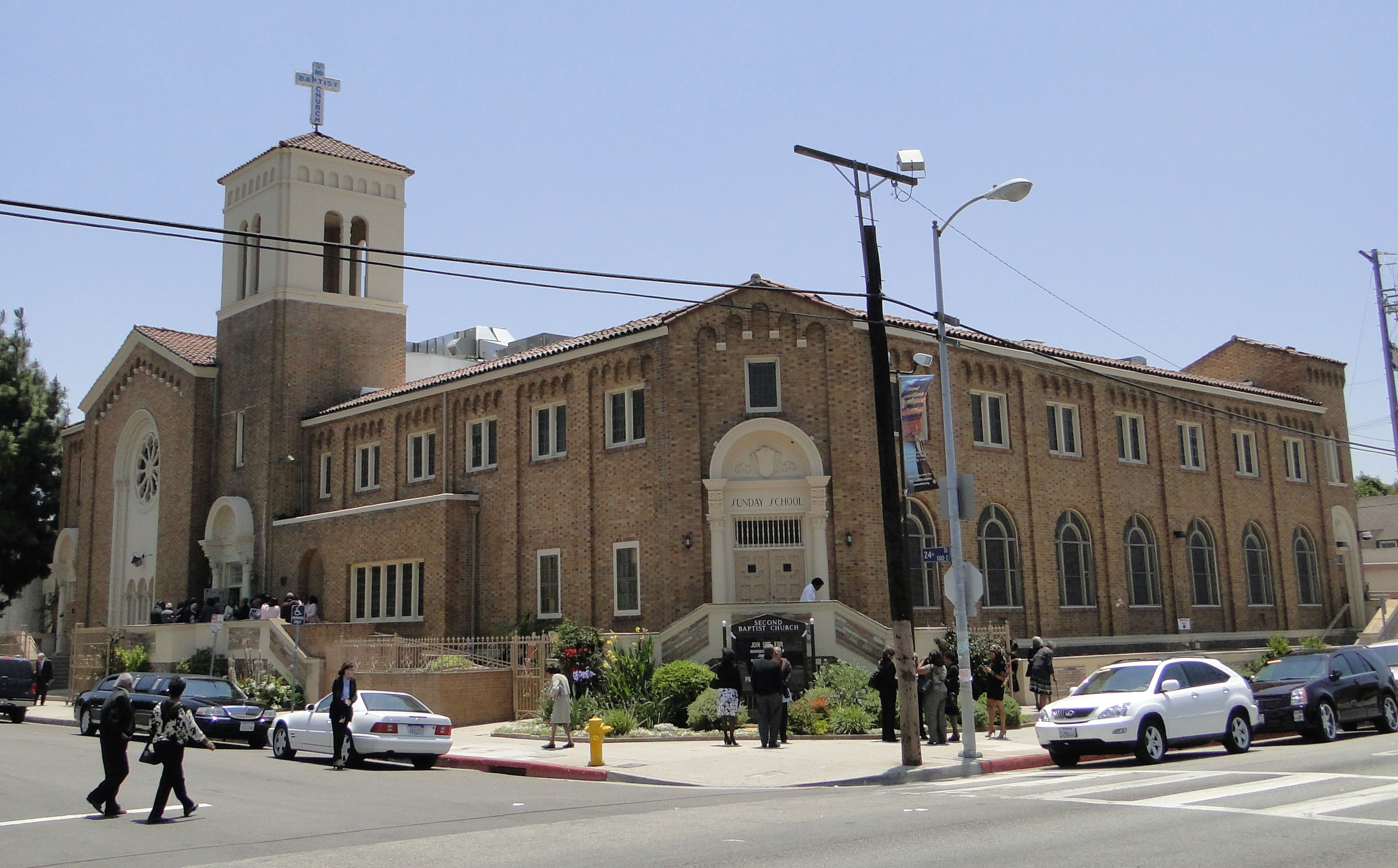
- Second Baptist Church, June 2011
- Second Baptist Church
- Location: South Los Angeles
- Address: 2412 Griffith Avenue; Los Angeles, California
- Country: United States
- Denomination: Baptist
- Website: Church website

Architecture
- Architect(s): Paul R. Williams, Norman F. Marsh
- Style: Lombardy Romanesque Revival
- Years built: 1926
- Construction cost: $175,000

Clergy
- Pastor: Rev. Dr. James D. Key
- Second Baptist Church
- U.S. National Register of Historic Places
- Los Angeles Historic-Cultural Monument
- Location within the Los Angeles metropolitan area Location within California Location within the United States
- Location: 2412 Griffith Avenue, Los Angeles, California
- Coordinates: 34°01′16″N 118°15′23″W
- NRHP reference No.: 09000151
- LAHCM No.: 200

Significant dates
- Added to NRHP: March 17, 2009
- Designated LAHCM: October 18, 1978

Second Baptist Church is a Baptist Church located in South Los Angeles, California. The current Lombardy Romanesque Revival building was built in 1926 and has been listed as a Los Angeles Historic-Cultural Monument (1978) and on the National Register of Historic Places (2009). The church has been an important force in the Civil Rights Movement, hosting national conventions of the National Association for the Advancement of Colored Persons ("NAACP") in 1928, 1942, and 1949, and also serving as the site of important speeches by Martin Luther King Jr., Malcolm X, and others. It is affiliated with the American Baptist Churches USA and the Progressive National Baptist Convention.

== Church building ==
The Second Baptist Church occupies a Lombardy Romanesque Revival church structure located along 24th Street to the west of Central Avenue. The structure was built in 1926 at a total cost of approximately $175,000, including the land, building and furnishings. The structure was designed by African-American architect Paul R. Williams in collaboration with Norman Marsh. The church building opened in January 1926 with seating for more than 2,000 persons. The church's pastor at the time the church was built was Dr. Thomas L. Griffith, who served in that position from 1921 to 1941.

According to a history of the church, the congregation's leaders acquired the property on which the current structure sits after hiring a real estate agent "who was very light in complexion." The leaders were reportedly concerned that white property owners may not sell to an African-American organization and hoped that the white owners would be more inclined to sell to a light-skinned agent who appeared to be "a member of their racial group."

== Historical significance ==
On May 13, 1885, Second Baptist Church, the first African-American Baptist Church in Southern California, was organized in Los Angeles. Second Baptist Church was born in the minds and hearts of early African-American Baptists in Los Angeles who felt the need to have their own church where the free expression of worship in the black idiom could flow uninhibited. Of the three persons who started the church only the name of the first pastor is remembered, Reverend S. C. Pierce. Rev. Pierce organized Second Baptist Church and ministered there for two years.

The Second Baptist Church building was listed as a Los Angeles Historic-Cultural Monument in 1978 and on the National Register of Historic Places in 2009. The Central Avenue Corridor became the cultural and business hub of the African-American community in Los Angeles from the 1920s to the 1950s. The Second Baptist Church building, located one block west of Central Avenue at 24th Street, was deemed to satisfy the registration requirements set forth in the Multiple Property Submission for African-Americans in Los Angeles. Other sites listed pursuant to the same Multiple Property Submission include the Lincoln Theater (located one block east of the church on Central Avenue), the 27th Street Historic District (a well-preserved residential neighborhood located three blocks south of the church), the 28th Street YMCA (providing a swimming pool and other recreational activities in the years when the city's recreational facilities were racially segregated), the Prince Hall Masonic Temple, 52nd Place Historic District, and two historic all-black segregated fire stations (Fire Station No. 14 and Fire Station No. 30).

Among the historic institutions along the Central Avenue Corridor, the Second Baptist Church played a particularly vital role in the Civil Rights Movement. With a seating capacity in excess of 2,000 persons, the church was the largest meeting space owned by the African-American community in the western United States in the era before World War II. The church hosted the national convention of the National Association for the Advancement of Colored People (NAACP) on three occasions—1928, 1942, and 1949. When the NAACP convention came to Second Baptist in 1928, it was the first time that the NAACP held its national convention in the western United States. Prominent speakers in the early years of the church included writer W. E. B. Du Bois and poet Alice Dunbar Nelson.

The congregation was also active in campaigns against racial discrimination in housing, public beaches, swimming pools, and restaurants. In 1954, the congregation contributed $1,500 to the NAACP Legal Defense Fund to print the briefs used in the United States Supreme Court case, Brown v. Board of Education. The church also provided scholarship funds to enable future Nobel Peace Prize winner Ralph Bunche to attend the University of California, Los Angeles (UCLA). It was also "the West Coast 'home'" for Dr. Martin Luther King Jr. who spoke at Second Baptist on many occasions from May 1956 to March 1968. Other noted persons to speak at Second Baptist include Malcolm X, who delivered an impassioned speech at the church in May 1962 after several Muslims were shot in a gun battle with police in front of the Muslim Temple, and Adam Clayton Powell Jr.

== Changing demographics ==
In recent decades, the demographics of the neighborhood surrounding Second Baptist Church has changed from an overwhelmingly African-American community to one that, as of 2007, was 40% African American and more than 50% Latino. The demographic change saw many of Second Baptist's members move to other areas of the city. However, the pastor, Rev. William Epps, opted to keep Second Baptist in the building it has occupied since 1926. Although the church remains predominantly African-American, the church's nursery school as of 2007 was 98% Latino. Second Baptist has also rented its sanctuary to Spanish-speaking Protestant congregations for services.

== Selected chronology ==
The following is a list of some of the important speeches and other milestone events in the history of the Second Baptist Church.

=== 1920s and 1930s ===
- January 3, 1926: At the dedication for the current church structure, the Rev. Adam Clayton Powell Sr., pastor of Harlem's Abyssinian Baptist Church, delivered the sermon in which he called the building as the "most elaborate" Baptist church on the west coast.
- February 29, 1926: A mass meeting was held at Second Baptist to launch a campaign to increase membership of the Los Angeles branch of the NAACP to 5,000 persons.
- June 1928: The 19th annual conference of the NAACP was conducted at Second Baptist, the first time the NAACP conference had been held in the western United States. Persons attending the conference included W.E.B. Du Bois, James Weldon Johnson, and Arthur B. Spingarn. The Spingarn Medal was presented to author, Charles W. Chesnutt.
- August 12, 1932: The Western Baptist Association of Southern California, an association of African-American Baptist churches, held its 40th annual convention at Second Baptist. A resolution was passed favoring existing prohibition laws and their enforcement but also commending a plank in the Republican platform allowing each state to change the law.

=== 1940s and 1950s ===
- September 24, 1941: Republican National Chairman (and later Speaker of the House) Joe Martin spoke to the national convention of the Women's Political Study Club, which was held at Second Baptist. Martin urged African-Americans to vote for a Republican House of Representatives in 1942. He charged that the New Dealers' answer to every problem was a request for more money and power, and warned that the New Deal policies had led the country to the brink of bankruptcy. Martin added, "There can be no help from the New Deal. They have had their chance and failed."
- July 13–19, 1942: The 33rd annual conference of the NAACP was held at Second Baptist seven months after the United States entered World War II. Attendees included Walter White, Daisy Lampkin, Thurgood Marshall, and Roy Wilkins. California Governor Culbert Olson welcomed the delegates to Los Angeles in the opening address. The conference passed a resolution supporting the war effort, condemning Nazi racial principles, and acknowledging that "all civil rights are slated for destruction if Nazism is victorious." Wendell Willkie, former Republican Presidential candidate, spoke at the NAACP convention, advocated an end to colonialism, and castigated white Americans for their attitude to African-Americans. Willkie noted, "The attitude of the white citizens of this country toward the Negroes has undeniably had some of the unlovely and tragic characteristics of an alien imperialism -- a smug racial superiority, a willingness to exploit an unprotected people." He also declared that the "test of a people is their aim, not their color," and noted that the shared aims in the ongoing war with Germany and Japan were beginning to break down "longstanding prejudices and barriers."
- July 1949: The annual conference of the NAACP was held at Second Baptist. Thurgood Marshall, then head of the NAACP's legal activities, reported on efforts to have all cases involving racial discrimination cleared through state and national offices for unified judgment. The delegates dispatched a telegraph to Pres. Harry S. Truman and Congressional leaders, calling for prompt action in passing civil rights legislation. Rayford Logan delivered a speech condemning the United Nations for failing to take action in support of the Universal Declaration of Human Rights, and pointed to civil rights violations in South Africa, Rhodesia, Italian Somaliland, Kenya, and the United States.
- November 6, 1949: A. Philip Randolph, international president of the Brotherhood of Sleeping Car Porters, spoke at Second Baptist. Randolph criticized Paul Robeson for comments indicating that African-Americans could not be drawn into a war with the Soviet Union. Randolph charged that Communists had "split Negro leadership when unity is needed." He accused Robeson of hobnobbing with Europeans rather than mingling with African-Americans and declared that the time had come for African-Americans to take a stand against Communism. Numerous picketers gathered outside the church as Randolph spoke, handing out flyers quoting Robeson's remarks and advertising a meeting celebrating the 32nd anniversary of the Russian Revolution.
- January 1953: Second Baptist Church opened its membership to all races. The move followed a unanimous vote by the congregation. The pastor, Rev. J. Raymond Henderson (pastor from 1941 to 1963) stated that "we are opposed to race prejudice and to the idea of a segregated church."
- October 4, 1953: George Meany, president of the American Federation of Labor, appeared at Second Baptist to address the 28th annual international convention of the AFL Brotherhood of Sleeping Car Porters. Meany said that world peace was the most important issue for Americans and that the threat to world peace came from the Soviet Union. He called Communists a people who would destroy faith in a Divine Being and who had a "devil's religion." He also criticized the "exponents of white supremacy" and urged his listeners to use the ballot to get justice under the law.
- 1954: The Second Baptist Church congregation raised $1,500 to print briefs filed by the NAACP Legal Defense Fund with the U.S. Supreme Court in the landmark Brown vs. Board of Education case.
- October 9, 1955: Dr. Theodore R.M. Howard, president-elect of the National Medical Association, spoke at Second Baptist to tell the background to the murder of Emmett Till in Sumner, Mississippi. Dr. Howard had asked for a meeting with Vice President Richard Nixon and Attorney General Herbert Brownell Jr., to urge the federal government to protect African-Americans in Mississippi.

=== 1960s ===
- July 12, 1961: Following a sermon by Dr. J. Raymond Henderson on "the sin of moral neutrality," a group of 12 local residents (eight white, four African-American) departed from Second Baptist Church on a bus to join the Freedom Riders in Mississippi. Parishioners donated $2,500 to buy round-trip bus tickets for the riders. The Freedom Riders walked past "a farewell throng" from Second Baptist before boarding the bus. One of the riders, Marilyn Eisenberg, an 18-year-old student at UC Berkeley, told a reporter outside the church, "This is the best thing I can do to push forward this fight for integration of one segment of the south."
- May 13, 1962: A mass meeting billed as the "Citizens Protest Rally Committee" was attended by 1,200 persons at Second Baptist. The gathering called for an inquiry into the causes of violence that erupted after one Muslim was killed and six others wounded in a gun battle with police in front of the Muslim Temple. One speaker, Wendell Green, charged that Los Angeles policemen act "like a conquering army in an occupied country when dealing with Negroes." Muslim leader Malcolm X also spoke at the meeting. In his comments, Malcolm X told the crowd: "They say we hate because we tell the truth. They say we inflame the Negro. The hell they've been catching for 400 years has inflamed them. We were brought here 400 years ago in chains. And it's been 400 years of undiluted hell. If we don't hate the white man, then you don't know what you're talking about." The Los Angeles Times reported that Malcolm X's comments were met with a standing ovation, wild cheers, and thunderous applause. The pastor of Second Baptist, the Rev. J. Raymond Henderson, spoke after Malcolm X and criticized "the inflammatory speeches made today." While agreeing there was a problem with police brutality, Rev. Henderson noted that the church had been loaned to the group on the understanding that it was to be a peaceful meeting and added, "We don't want it said that the Muslims ran this meeting. We are not in favor of hating anyone."
- January 19, 1964: Dr. Thomas Kilgore Jr., was installed as the pastor at Second Baptist. He had been a minister for 16 years at Friendship Baptist Church in New York and had established himself as a leader in the civil rights movement. Dr. Kilgore remained the pastor at Second Baptist until 1985.
- February 16, 1964: Martin Luther King Jr., spoke to a standing-room-only capacity congregation at Second Baptist. His sermon included the reading of an imaginary "letter" from St. Paul on Crete to American Christians. Dr. King called for "a new Jefferson to proclaim that all men are created equal," advised listeners to avoid hatred and violence in the struggle for equal rights, and predicted that the struggle would be long and hard. A youth chorus sang "I Have A Dream," composed by Mrs. Esther Hines of the Second Baptist music department. A special collection was taken at the ceremony to raise funds to rebuild three Southern churches that had been burned. Dr. King noted that the churches had been burned because their people wanted the right to vote and noted that "the fact that they were burned indicated that those churches had become so relevant and were doing enough so that somebody wanted to burn them out."
- March 1964: Rev. Ralph Abernathy of the Southern Christian Leadership Conference conducted an annual evangelistic service and preaching mission at Second Baptist.
- August 29, 1964: Journalist Louis Lomax spoke to a group of 50 civil rights leaders at Second Baptist. Lomax urged civil rights leaders to speak publicly against rioting in Philadelphia. He predicted it would be "a long, hot fall" in Los Angeles and encouraged the leaders to go "into the homes, poolrooms and, if necessary, the dens of iniquity" if they wanted to achieve true leadership. He chided some in the group as publicity seekers, "Many of you got on the freedom train just in time to get on TV."
- November 1964: After FBI director J. Edgar Hoover called Dr. King a "notorious liar," Dr. Thomas Kilgore Jr., pastor of Second Baptist, called for Hoover to either apologize for his statements to submit his resignation. Rev. Kilgore noted that he had known Dr. King since he was three years old and recalled "dandling young Martin on his knee more than 30 years ago." Rev. Kilgore released a telegram he had sent to President Johnson expressing "grave concern" over Hoover's comments.
- March 17, 1968: Martin Luther King Jr., spoke at Second Baptist two weeks before he was assassinated. Delivering the sermon at the Sunday worship service, Dr. King spoke against the Vietnam War, declaring that the United States was involved in a "senseless, reckless, immoral and unwinnable war." He noted that John F. Kennedy had been courageous in admitting he made a mistake after the Bay of Pigs fiasco, and continued, "It is time for somebody in Washington to say we made a mistake in Vietnam." Dr. King also said that white racism was "still a glaring reality in our country," and charged that the U.S. Congress, dominated by the rural South, "stands as a stubborn force in the way of social progress."
- April 5, 1968: African-American leaders gathered at Second Baptist in a show of unity following the assassination of Dr. King one day earlier. The gathering was attended by leaders including Augustus F. Hawkins, Tom Bradley, and Gordon Parks. There was "a roar of applause and cheers" from the crowd of 2,500 when a recording of one of Dr. King's speeches was played. The Los Angeles Times described the service: "Men in suits and women in Sunday dresses were outnumbered by youths, who wore berets, sweatshirts with portraits of Negro leaders and casual clothing. The mood of the meeting was constructive, rather than antagonistic. The meeting did not serve as a place to air blind bitterness against 'the honkie.'"
- October 25, 1968: Rev. Ralph Abernathy, president of the Southern Christian Leadership Conference, led followers on a mule train from 103rd Street and Central Avenue to Second Baptist. Rev. Abernathy told the crowd that the two mules pulling his carriage were named "George Wallace" and "Ronald Reagan." At Second Baptist, Rev. Abernathy urged African-American voters to vote their conscience. Without formally endorsing Hubert Humphrey for President of the United States, Rev. Abernathy warned that the other candidates (Richard Nixon and George Wallace) would "turn back the clock" on civil rights.

=== 1970s and beyond ===
- May 1972: Coretta Scott King appeared at Second Baptist to announce her endorsement of Yvonne Braithwaite in her campaign for Congress. Traveling to Los Angeles to continue her husband's nonviolent movement, Mrs. King commented on the shooting a few days earlier of former Alabama Gov. George Wallace: "We are victimized by the same kind of evil force and I think until we stop this force and heal the sickness of this nation, we will all be destroyed."
- October - November 1974: Second Baptist hosted a series of national speakers in a forum called "The Quality of Life." The speakers slated to appear at Second Baptist as part of the forum included Rev. Jesse Jackson of Operation PUSH, Vernon Jordan of the National Urban League, Los Angeles Mayor Tom Bradley, Robert McAfee Brown of Stanford University, and John R. Hubbard of the University of Southern California.
- September 11, 1977: United Nations Ambassador Andrew Young spoke on the subject of illegal immigrants at Second Baptist. Young called the United States "a stew" rather than a melting pot, noting that "the onions and the garlic and the meat won't fully blend, but they all contribute to the flavor." He said that immigrants from Mexico, Puerto Rico, and the Orient, like European immigrants before them, were people "searching for a new truth, a new possibility, a new kind of freedom of expression."
- February 8, 1979: A group of 131 African-American preachers gathered at Second Baptist and formed "The Gathering," an ecumenical group seeking to reduce an increase in police brutality.
- March 1979: Mayor Tom Bradley spoke from the pulpit at Second Baptist to encourage members to vote in the upcoming city elections. Bradley told reporters at the time, "The black church has been a center of activism. It achieved the right to vote. It has tried to inject into political service a kind of ethical and spiritual value ... the church can speak without retaliation by employers, by powerful business interests."
- May 16, 1980: Former Governor Edmund G. Brown and Vice President Walter Mondale appeared at Second Baptist, and Brown announced his endorsement of Pres. Jimmy Carter in his re-election campaign.
- September 20, 1981: Former Vice President Walter Mondale spoke at Second Baptist, criticizing President Reagan's budget cuts for "closing the door" on the poor and disadvantaged.
- October 1987: Rev. William Epps became the pastor of Second Baptist Church. Rev. Otis Moss Jr., served briefly as pastor from the time of Dr. Kilgore's retirement at the end of 1985 until shortly before the appointment of Rev. Epps.
- February 19, 1994: A group of African-American ministers held a press conference at Second Baptist Church denouncing "persecution frenzy" directed at singer Michael Jackson, who had been accused of child molestation. The ministers criticized press coverage for trying and convicting Jackson in the media.
- April 1999: Second Baptist Church hosts its 35th Annual Community Good Friday service featuring the "Seven Last Words of Christ." Participating pastors included Rev. Oliver Brown of Westminster Presbyterian Church, the Rev. Lydia Waters of Crossroads/Nija United Methodist Church, Dr. William S. Epps of Second Baptist and four other local pastors.
- December 2000: Mayoral candidate James Hahn spoke at Second Baptist and criticized the conduct of the November 2000 presidential election in which African-American voters said many of their votes were not counted and voting was made difficult in Florida.
- 2001: Second Baptist Church received a grant from the Getty Trust to help rehabilitate the historic church building.
- 2007: Second Baptist Church commenced a $5 million renovation of its sanctuary complex.

== See also ==
- National Register of Historic Places listings in Los Angeles, California
- List of Los Angeles Historic-Cultural Monuments in South Los Angeles
