= Stentorians =

Organization of African American firefighters based in Los Angeles, California

- Formation: 1954
- Founded at: Los Angeles, California

The Stentorians are a fraternal organization of African American firefighters, based in Los Angeles, California, and founded in 1954.

== Background ==
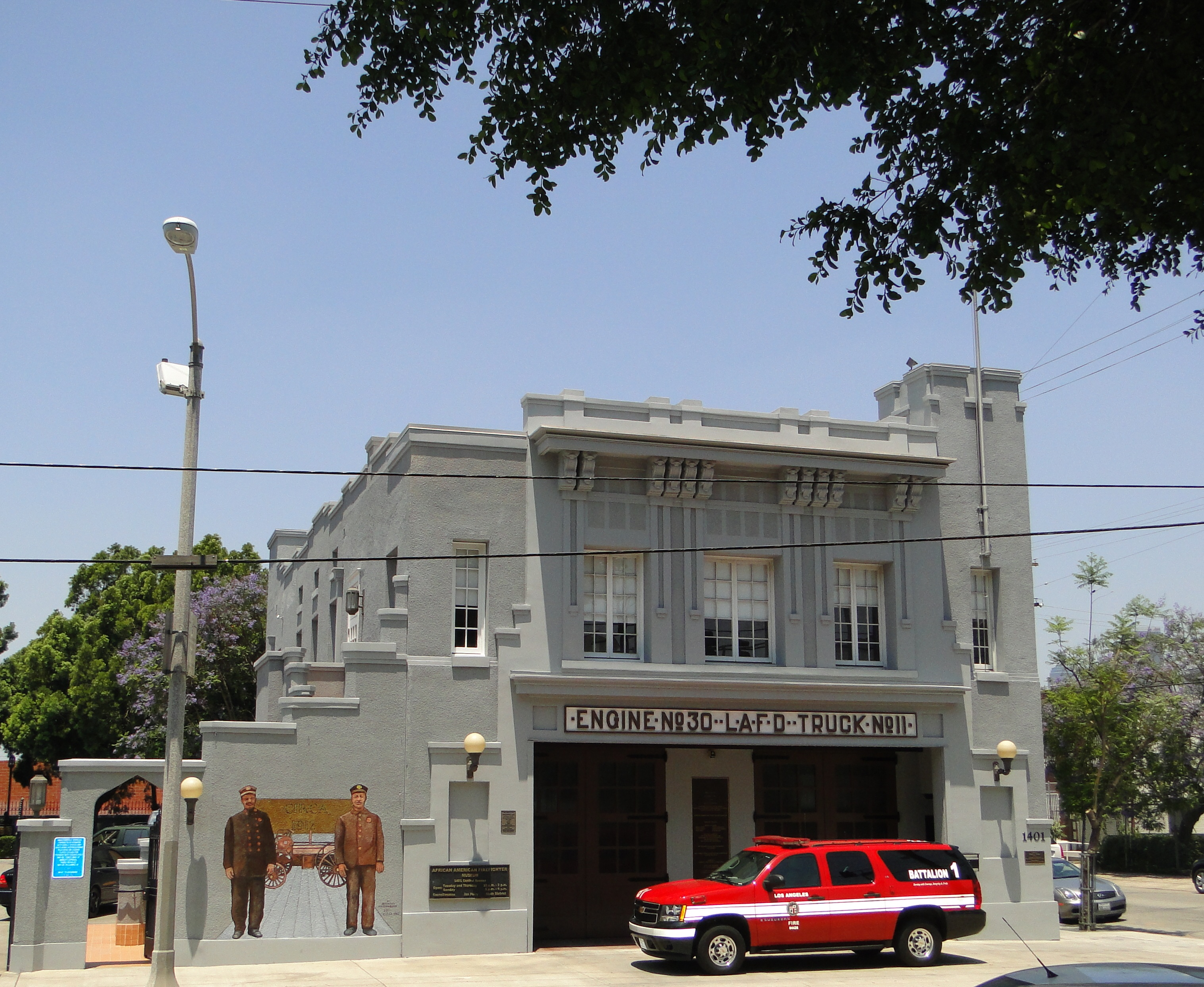
Fire Station No. 30

The residents of the Central-Alameda neighborhood of South Los Angeles were initially mostly white. By 1930, the neighborhood had changed to predominantly black. By 1950, it was home to two all-black, segregated fire stations (Fire Station No. 14 and Fire Station No. 30). The Fire Chief Engineer of Los Angeles, John Alderson, was regarded by black residents as a staunch segregationist who was preventing the integration of the LAFD.

After the 1954 Supreme Court decision in Brown vs. Board of Education and other cases, Alderson asked the Los Angeles city attorney whether the decision affected his department, and was told that it did. Based on this, Alderson assigned black firefighters from the segregated fire stations to all-white fire houses. The introduction of blacks to all-white firehouses, particularly Fire Station #10, increased tension among fire crews during down times. By the end of the following year, some black firefighters had taken to arming themselves, fearing retribution for some slight reported in the news media.

Newspaper writers penned articles both pro and con integration. In 1951, the California Eagle, the West Coast's largest African-American newspaper, owned and operated by Charlotta Bass, was taken over by its former writer turned city editor, lawyer Loren Miller. An early proponent (1920s under editor J.B. Bass {d.1934} and followed by Charlotta) of integration and Civil Rights, the Eagle pushed for diversity and ran editorials against segregation. The Bass home is listed in the 52nd Place Historic District, which is in the US National Register of Historic Places. In 1954, Loren Miller, active in the local NAACP, pushed to integrate the LAFD.

== Foundation ==
In 1954, firefighter Arnett Hartsfield Jr. founded the Stentorians as a fraternal group of black firefighters. The organization took its name from the Greek root, stentor, meaning a powerful voice. (Note: The Greek 'Stentor' meaning "(of a person's voice) loud and powerful" was taken from Homer's epic the Iliad - describing the herald Stentor who had a voice as loud as that of 50 men, and was fitting for blacks making their stand for inclusion.) They espoused non-violence and adopted the slogan, "We only fight the department on integration." The Stentorians determined that to protect the men, a round-the-clock patrol would deploy to guard the black firefighters at Fire Station 10. CBS Channel 2 news ran newscasts of recordings after a reporter provided the Stentorians with special microphones to record the night-long hazings.

=== Arnett Hartsfield Jr. ===
Arnett Hartsfield Jr. (died November 1, 2014, at age 95) was the co-founder of the Stentorians organization. He served as an Army lieutenant during WWII in a segregated unit. He became a firefighter and later an instructor. Hartsfield was appointed to the LAFD in 1940 and retired after 20 years working at Old Station 30 in south Los Angeles. While firefighting, he used the GI Bill to return to school and attended both UCLA and USC, earning a law degree in 1955. He retired in 1961 from the LAFD to practice law full-time. He fought to integrate the LAFD. He also served as the historian at the Fire Station No. 30, Engine Company No. 30, where he spent 10 hours a week volunteering. His was the generation of black "firsts", many of whom are remembered for the integration fights that led the full appearance of the Civil Rights Movement in America. He was later appointed Civil Service commissioner by Mayor Tom Bradley and served as "Fire Chief for a Day", achieving the chance at promotion he felt he was unfairly denied while a firefighter.

== History of African-Americans in the Los Angeles Fire Department ==
The history of African-American firefighters in the LAFD began to take shape in the 1940s and 1950s when individual firefighters and officers began organizing and making their voices heard. As their numbers in the ranks grew, slowly at first but with the return of many blacks after serving in the military overseas, they stood firm that there was a place for them at the table of civil service. Many, once appointed, were ostracized by their fellow firefighters, so the model of a fraternal organization was used across the country in forming groups. The most notable of the groups were the Vulcan Society of the FDNY and the Stentorians of the LAFD. Within those groups, black firefighters found solace among their brethren by holding their own affairs and allying themselves with other ostracized groups like the Jewish firefighters; both groups whom the mostly Irish and Catholic white firefighters opposed being part of firehouse life.

=== Early black recruits to the Fire Department ===
On December 6, 1888, a black man, Sam Haskins, born a slave in 1840 from Virginia, was listed in the census as an employed fireman for the city of Los Angeles, assigned to Engine Company #4. In 1892 Haskins was appointed as a Call Man and assigned to Engine #2, making him the first black man hired by the Los Angeles Fire Department. Haskins was fatally injured on November 19, 1895, while responding to a fire call on 1st Street. When the steamer he was riding on hit a bump in the road, Haskins lost his balance and fell between the steamer's boiler and the wheel. He was the first firefighter of any race to die on duty with the Los Angeles Fire Department.

The second black fireman, George Bright, was appointed to the department two years later, on September 21, 1897. Three years later he was assigned to the newly segregated Hose Company #4 on Loma Drive near Beverly Blvd. That is where all subsequent black firefighters were sent, following the Supreme Court ruling in Plessy vs. Ferguson that established "separate but equal" as the law of the land.

In 1900, William Glenn was hired as the third black fireman in the LAFD. He subsequently left to become the 3rd black patrolman in the LAPD.

=== Attempts at integration ===
The battle for integration began with the mayoral election of 1953. Norris Poulson, the newly elected mayor, wanted to install his own fire chief, and sought a pretext to oust the current head of the LAFD, fire chief engineer John Alderson. A month after taking office, he was given a petition backed by the NAACP that protested that the LAFD did not represent the people it served because it was not integrated. Poulson, who was against fair employment practices, sought to use this petition to get the fire commission to fire the chief engineer. Alderson wanted no interference from city hall but then was beset on another front. When the fire commission ordered him to produce a plan on integration and the white ranks learned of this, they raised $500,000 and formed a fact-finding committee to investigate whether integration was possible and petitioned the fire commission to hold any decision until October 14, 1954. Before the results of this committee were heard, the commissioners ordered Alderson to integrate, which he began to do. Four black firefighters were sent to other firehouses from the two segregated firehouses. Tensions rose; the fact-finding committee reported back to the commission that under no circumstances should integration occur. By then, the firehouses that were integrated became hellhouses for the black firefighters. Nightly hazing had become warped and degrading. When six more blacks were sent to the Old #10 firehouse, the tension was palpable. By the end of 1955, Chief Alderson removed the men from the white firehouses (so-called ‘Hate Houses’), for their safety, much to the chagrin of the fire commission, which then fired him for insubordination. Wearied by the year's events and vilified by the Eagle's campaign to remove the segregationist, Alderson announced that he would retire at years end. The commission sheepishly let the dismissal drop, as it seemed they were being petty firing the retiring chief engineer. The media had been critical of Alderson and remained neutral over his conflict with the fire commission. Alderson retired at the end of the year. Deputy Chief Frank Rothermel became interim chief engineer until William L. Miller became the fire chief engineer on January 17, 1956, and began to integrate the LAFD. Miller, not wanting to be in the same place as the man he replaced, quietly went about the task. With some white firefighters backing integration and receiving punishment for it, the tide had turned against segregation and Miller went ahead and transferred black and white firefighters to Fire Station 7 at 2824 S. Main Street. Calling it an "experiment", Miller had chosen men he knew were un-opposed to integration for the assignment at Fire Station 7.

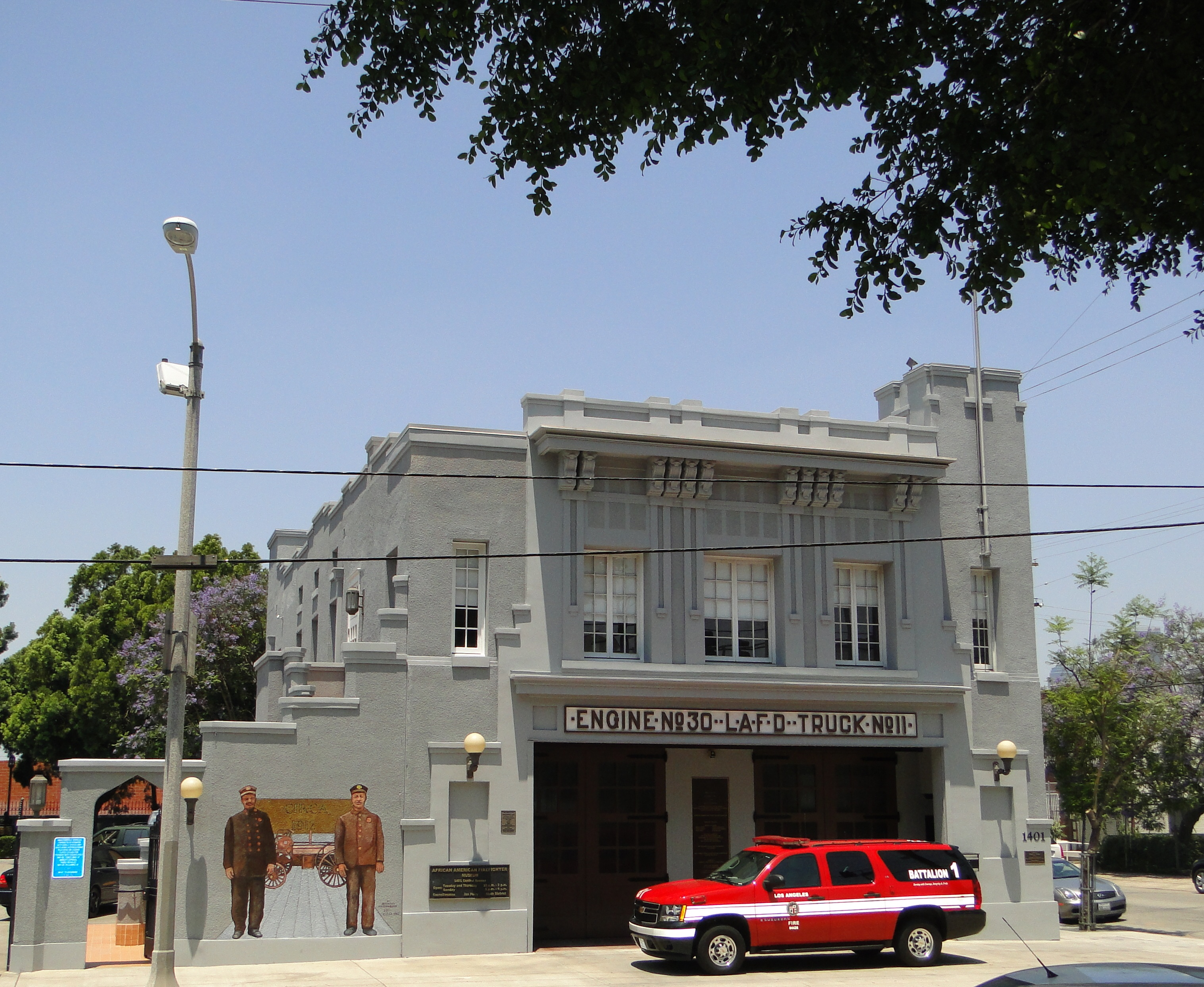

=== September 1956 Integration of the LAFD ===
By September 1956, old #30 and #14 firehouses were integrated. All black firefighters formerly assigned at the segregated houses were transferred into 17 of the city's 91 fire stations. Hazings still occurred, but along the lines of the traditional firehouse fare all probies endured. The long crisis year of 1955-56 finally ended for the LAFD. Bradley Garret and Tolbert Young were the first blacks hired after integration. Both were terminated unfairly during their academy training, which path Jim Crow practices now took in the fire department. By 1959, barely 3% of the firefighters in the LAFD were African-American. During the 60 years following Alderson's departure, questions of whether he was a traditionalist protecting his department arose. Alderson believed in segregation, and he had convinced himself that his legal obligations under the city charter prohibited assignments based upon race, albeit that some of the city's laws now ran against the rulings adopted by the supreme court and made law everywhere across America.

This fight to integrate the LAFD was re-vitalized the Los Angeles chapter of the NAACP under newly elected president Thomas Neusom and vice president Loren Miller. By the 1960s, blacks and whites began marching en masse to gain recognition, culminating with the march on Washington and passage of the Voting Rights Act. The struggles of the Civil Rights era had begun with the stands made by civil service workers such as those Old Stentorians who fought for fairness and diversity in the ranks of the LAFD. By recruiting and mentoring youth to apply for the title and later in the ranks of the paramedics, the 1970s saw a rise in the number of black officers. While occasionally there was racial tension in the firehouse, the LAFD began to find itself under fire from the very communities they served. In 1965, Watts exploded into riots and firefighters of every stripe came under fire while on duty. The Stentorians came to understand a different sensibility of Jim Crow, namely harassment in various forms that didn't quite rise to the level of racial animosity, but as ret. f.f. Arnett Hartsfield recounted in 1973, "I had a degree in law yet I went to work and cleaned toilets!" When the call came in 1969 from New York that a national black firefighter organization was being formed, the Stentorians stepped up.

=== Post 1970 ===
In 1970, Captains David Floyd and John L.Ruffins Jr. of the FDNY Vulcan Society founded the International Association of Black Professional Firefighters, an international fraternal order that The Stentorians became a part of. Black firefighters across the country formed chapters.

In 1980, the Stentorians acquire old Station #46 at 1409 W. Vernon Ave. as their office and training center.

By 1990, the Stentorians had divided into two chapters, The Los Angeles County Stentorians and the Los Angeles City Stentorians. Today, the Los Angeles City Stentorians membership consists of more than 400 African-American men and women fire fighters and paramedics throughout Los Angeles. Both groups of Stentorians also belong to the International Association of Black Professional Firefighters, a national organization promoting equality for the fire service nationwide.

In 1991, the Executive Development Institute was created at Florida A&M University. This program was created by the International Association of Black Professional Firefighters as an alternative to the National Fire Academy. The previous year, the Los Angeles County Fire union, Local 1014 had accused the Stentorians of cheating on the entry-level exam for firefighters. As a result of the allegation, the fire chief threw out the exam, causing countless candidates to fail the new exam. The allegations were false, and the union and the Stentorians endured a rift in their otherwise cordial relationship. The EDI was created in response to this. Historically, Black firefighters had not been successful in attending the NFA for a variety of reasons. Later on, EDI was renamed in honor of Carl Holmes. Several members from the LAFD and the LACoFD graduated from the first class of this prestigious program. CarlHolmesEDI continues to exist today.

Many of the traditions that Stentorians started over sixty years ago continue today, including "Mentoring to Youth in the Community", "General Community Outreach", "Career Counseling", "Career Enhancement & Upward Mobility", and "Labor Relations." The members also serve as big brothers and big sisters for the Gwen Bolden Foundation. Through their involvement in the school system, the Foundation and the Stentorians have been able to offer community youth a viable alternative to the growing problems with gangs and drugs. The Stentorians have progressed and prospered over the years, becoming a well noted and respected organization in the community. Old Station 46 was renovated and became the home of the Stentorians, and renamed for Arnett Hartsfield Jr of the City and Van Davis of the County of LA fire departments.

== African American Firefighter Museum ==
On December 13, 1997, The African American Firefighter Museum opened. Firefighter and lead Paramedic Michelle Banks served as the first President. On opening day, fire chief Bamattre spoke to the Old Stentorians and issued a formal apology for enduring a terrible time during the integration of the LAFD during the mid-1950s. Station 30, along with station 14, integrated in 1956 and was later closed in 1980. It is now home to the African American Firefighter Museum and is dedicated to collecting, conserving and sharing the shared history and heritage of African American firefighters. The history of African American firefighters in Los Angeles spans more than 100 years and provides a unique glimpse into the history of firefighting, race relations and segregation in the city. It was one of two segregated fire stations where black firefighters worked in Los Angeles between 1924 and 1955. It was built in 1913 and served the Central Avenue community of the city. It is now beautifully restored and has the original apparatus floor tiles, poles and kitchen out-building. In 1985 Old Fire Station 30 was declared a Los Angeles Historic-Cultural Monument - #289 on the historic register - and is the recipient of the Los Angeles Conservancy's 1999 Preservation Award. It is opened to the public as a museum. In 2009 it was added to the National Register of Historic Places along with No. 14. Old Fire Station 30 exhibits display a wide array of firefighting gear including vintage engines (an 1890 hose wagon and a 1940 Pirsch ladder truck), uniforms from LA County and LA City firefighters, New York badges and uniforms, helmets of all kinds, displays of African American women firefighters, photographs, and other paraphernalia and firefighting artifacts.

== Today ==
In 2004 the Stentorians of the City and County hosted the I.A.B.P.F.F. Convention and the traditional "Memorial March", made its way down Crenshaw Blvd., creating a truly historical moment in Los Angeles’ history.

That same year, in 2004, an unmarked grave was re-made and the status of the occupant elevated. Deceased Fireman Sam Haskins was finally given an honorable burial when a headstone is placed over his remains in Evergreen Cemetery. For years, Haskins was buried in an unmarked grave and it was not known that he was the first Black Fireman in Los Angeles until the Los Angeles Times uncovered the story. Sam Haskins was born a slave in Virginia in 1840 and was appointed as a ‘Call Man’ to Engine #2, becoming the first black hired by the LAFD as a firefighter.

In 2009, Battalion Chief Millage Peaks, an African American and a 33-year veteran of the LAFD becomes the next Fire Chief to serve the City of Los Angeles.

In 2011, Daryl L. Osby is appointed by the County of Los Angeles Board of Supervisors as the Fire Chief of the department. He is the first African American to serve as the Fire Chief in the history of the Department

In 2011, LAFD Fire Chief Millage Peaks retires and Assistant Chief Brian Cummings, is appointed by the Mayor to the position of Fire Chief. Chief Cummings is the son of the late retired LAFD Engineer Lou Cummings, who served on Central Avenue during the days of segregation. Cummings

In 2022, Los Angeles Fire Department and Stentorian Deputy Chief Kristin Crowley is appointed as Fire Chief of LAFD.

The Stentorians hold a place amongst the civil rights fights that took place in the mid-twentieth century that continues to the present day. Resistance to men and women of color still exists in fire departments across the country and even though discrimination is no longer overt, the numbers of firefighters in the ranks do not reflect the demographics of the populations served, hence the continued need for such fraternal organizations. As recently as 2011 lawsuits filed by fraternal organizations and joined by the Justice Department forced the City of New York to settle with the Vulcan Society of the FDNY in making minority appointments from the lists established by the Dept of Personnel in 1999, 2002 and 2007, leading to the most diversified classes in the history of that city's fire dept.

== See also ==
- African-American history
- Los Angeles Fire Department
- Los Angeles Fire Department Museum and Memorial
- National Register of Historic Places listings in Los Angeles, California
