= Thomas Kilgore Jr. =

American Christian evangelist

The Reverend Thomas Kilgore Jr.
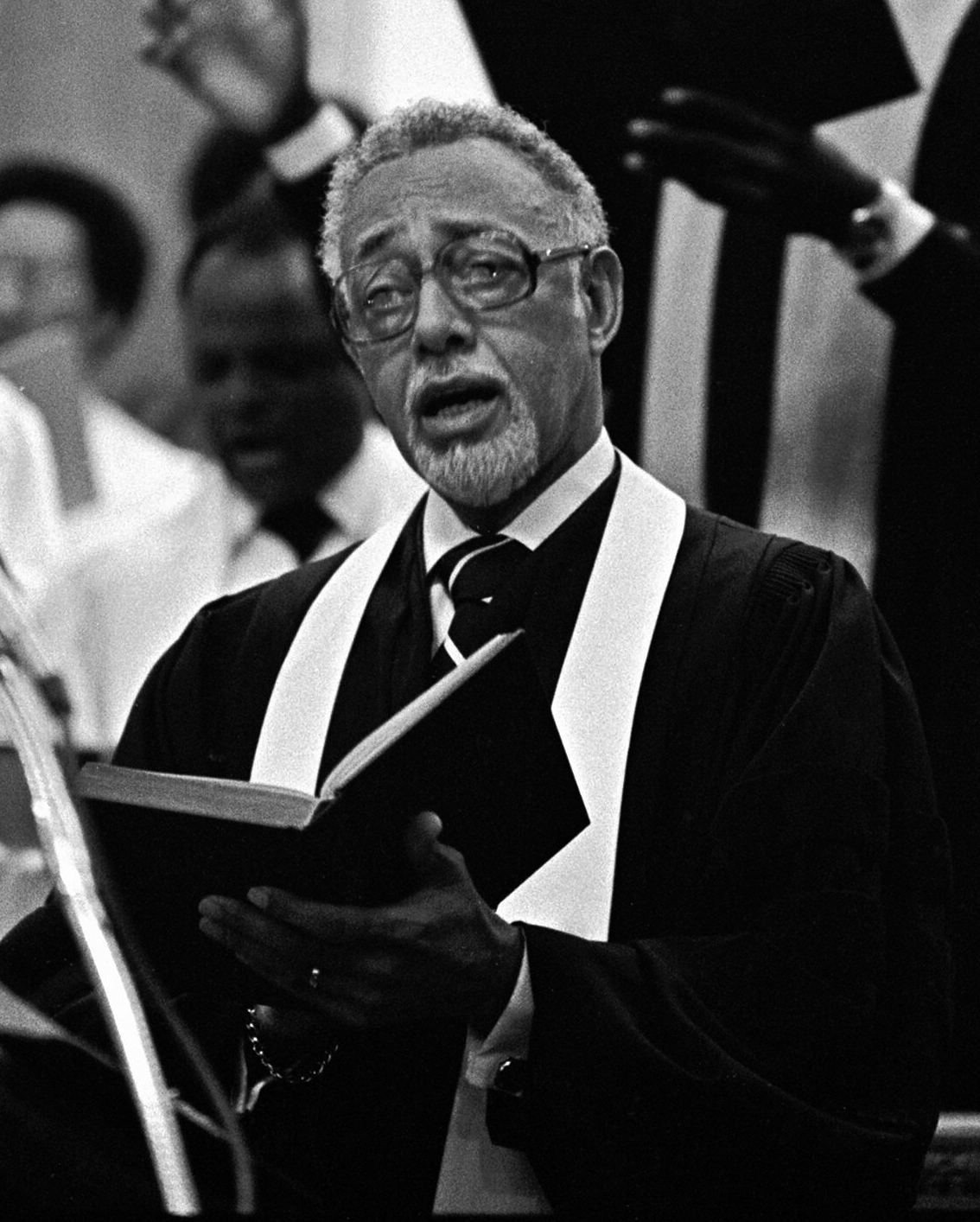
- Kilgore in 1979

Personal life
- Born: Thomas Kilgore Jr. February 20, 1913 Woodruff, South Carolina, U.S.
- Died: February 4, 1998 (aged 84) Los Angeles, California, U.S.
- Spouse: Jeannetta Miriam Scott (m. 1936)
- Education: Morehouse College

Religious life
- Religion: Christianity Protestantism
- Denomination: Baptist
- Profession: Clergyman

Thomas Kilgore Jr. was a prominent clergyman, community leader, and human rights activist. He helped organize the March on Washington.

== Biography ==
Kilgore was born in Woodruff, South Carolina. While a freshman at Morehouse College in Atlanta, he attended Ebeneezer Baptist Church, which was headed by the Reverend A. D. Williams, the maternal grandfather of Martin Luther King Jr. It was through this association that he got to know the King family. He first met Martin Luther King when the latter was only 2 1/2 years old.

When the Southern Christian Leadership Conference (SCLC) was founded in the late 1950s, Kilgore managed their New York office. In 1963, he helped organize the March on Washington. Also in 1963, Kilgore became pastor of Second Baptist Church, the oldest black Baptist church in Los Angeles. There he established the first chapter of SCLC west of the Rockies. He led Second Baptist Church until his retirement in 1985.

Kilgore died in Los Angeles on February 4, 1998. He was 84 years old.
