= Fire Station No. 14 (Los Angeles) =

Historic Californian fire station

- U.S. National Register of Historic Places
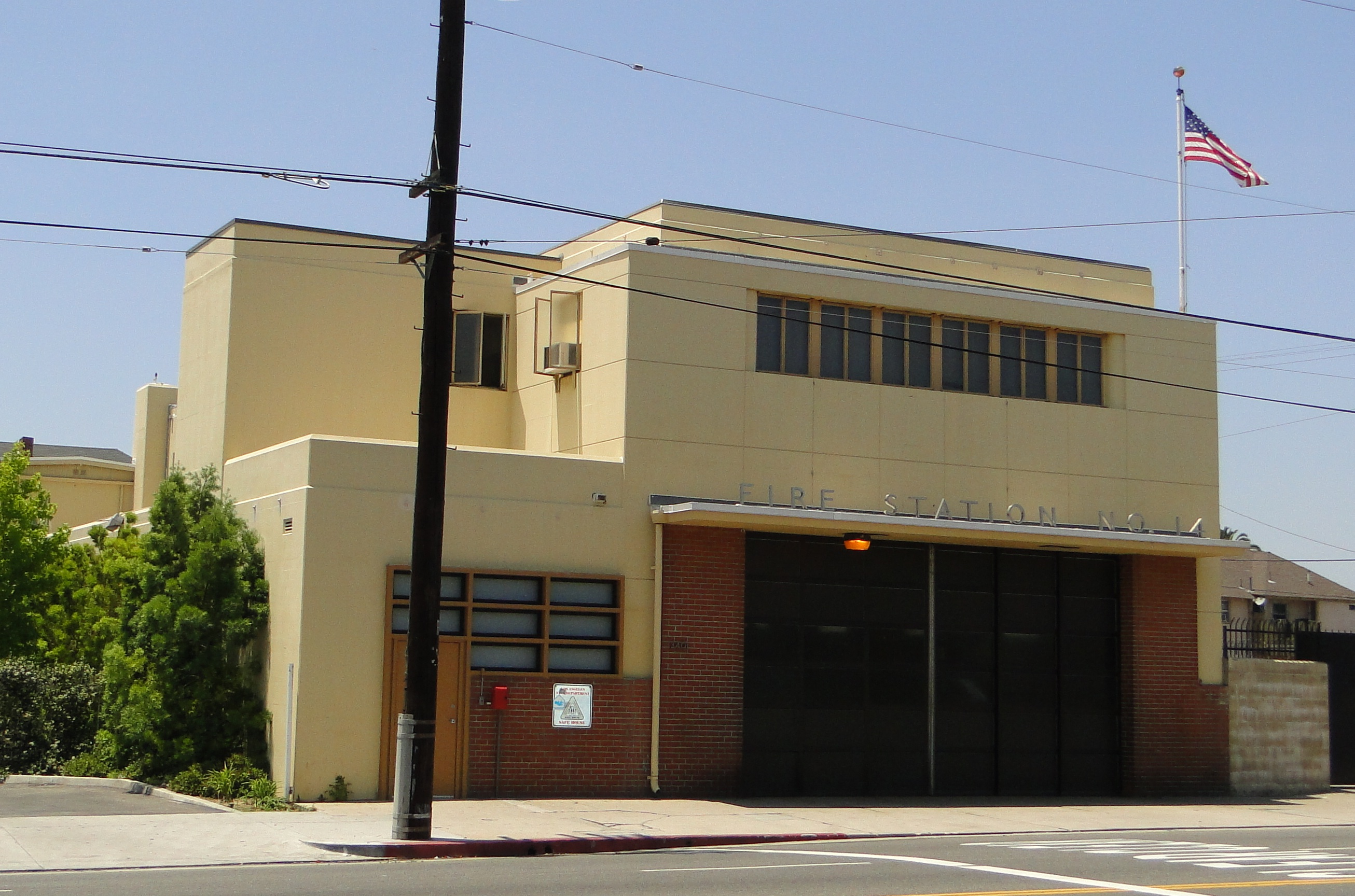
- Fire Station No. 14, June 2011

- Location within the Los Angeles metropolitan area Location within California Location within the United States
- Location: 3401 S. Central Ave., South Los Angeles, California
- Coordinates: 34°00′45.22″N 118°15′24.02″W
- Architect: Earl T. Heitschmidt
- Architectural style: International style
- NRHP reference No.: 09000147
- Added to NRHP: March 17, 2009

Fire Station No. 14 is a historic fire station in the South Los Angeles region of Los Angeles, California. The three-story structure was designed by Earl T. Heitschmidt in the International style and was built in 1949.

The structure was listed on the National Register of Historic Places in 2009 pursuant to the registration requirements for fire stations set forth in a multiple property submission study, the African Americans in Los Angeles MPS. It was the second of two all-black segregated fire stations in Los Angeles. According to the Registration Form supporting the station's listing on the National Register, "All-black fire stations were simultaneous representations of racial segregation and sources of community pride."

== See also ==
- Los Angeles Fire Department – American municipal fire department
- Los Angeles Fire Department Museum and Memorial
- National Register of Historic Places listings in Los Angeles
