= Hackett House =

Hackett House may refer to:

in the United States (by state)

- Roy Hackett House, Tempe, Arizona, listed on the National Register of Historic Places in Maricopa County, Arizona
- Edward Alexander Kelley Hackett House, Los Angeles, California, listed on the NRHP in California
- Hackett House (Napa, California), listed on the National Register of Historic Places in Napa County, California
- Erwin Charles Hackett House, Oregon City, Oregon, listed on the National Register of Historic Places in Clackamas County, Oregon
- Edward M. Hackett House, Reedsburg, Wisconsin, listed on the National Register of Historic Places in Sauk County, Wisconsin
