= Hotel Chancellor =

Historic building in Los Angeles, California, US

- U.S. National Register of Historic Places
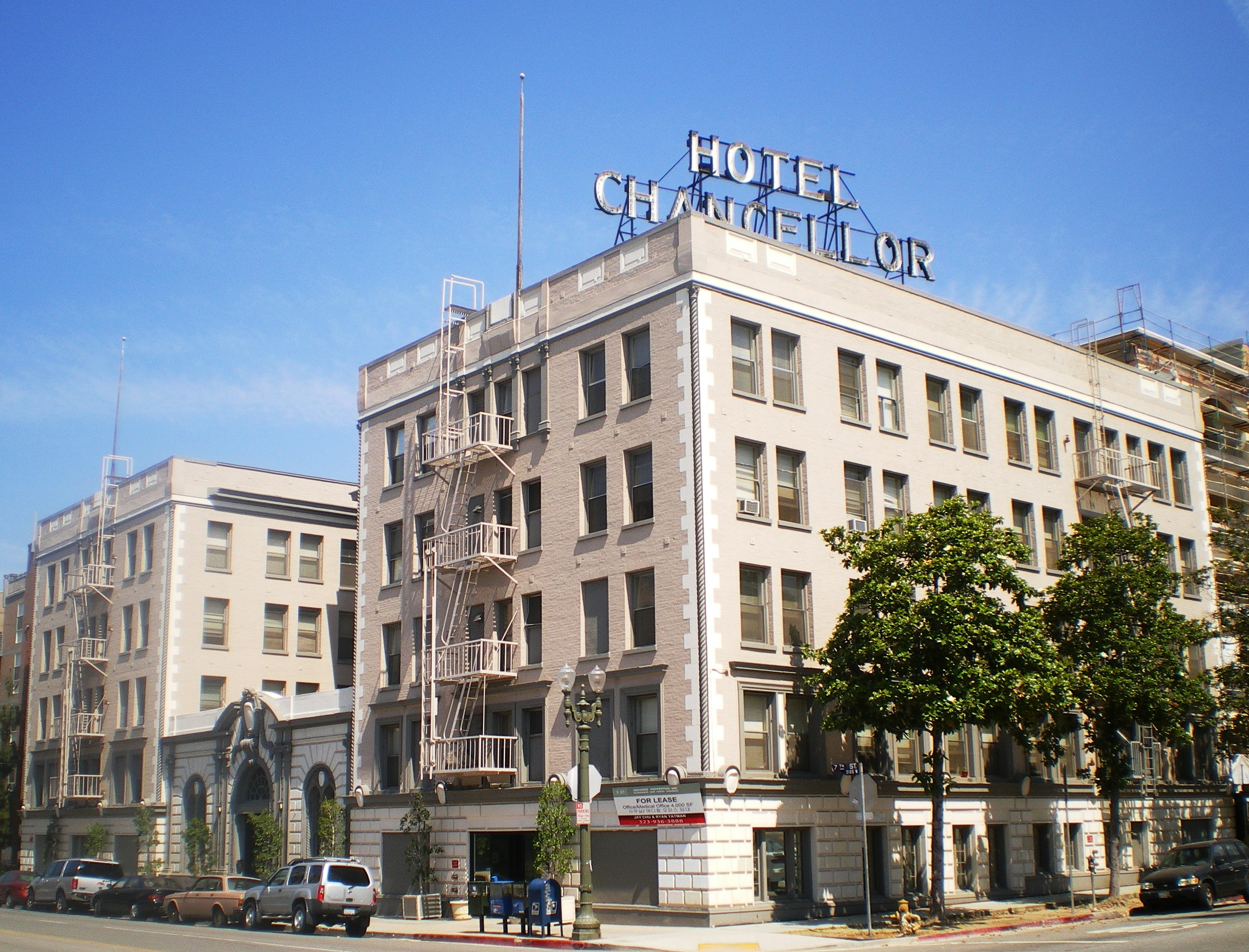
- Hotel Chancellor, 2008

- Location within the Los Angeles metropolitan area Location within California Location within the United States
- Location: 3191 W. Seventh St., Los Angeles, California
- Coordinates: 34°3′36″N 118°17′37″W
- Built: 1924
- Architect: Milton M. Friedman
- Architectural style: Beaux Arts
- NRHP reference No.: 05001496
- Added to NRHP: January 3, 2006

The Hotel Chancellor is a historic building in the Mid-Wilshire area of Los Angeles, California. Built in 1924, it was for many years located on the block to the east of the city's famous Ambassador Hotel. The structure was designed by Milton M. Friedman in the Beaux Arts style. It has since been converted from a hotel to an apartment building. In 2006, the building was listed on the National Register of Historic Places based on architectural criteria.

It is a five-story building designed with a lobby, a lounge/restaurant, and a banquet/ballroom on the ground level and in its partial basement level. It originally had 114 units on its four upper levels; these were modified to 106 units. It is about 150 by 60 feet (46 m × 18 m) in plan.

== See also ==
- List of Registered Historic Places in Los Angeles
