= National Register of Historic Places listings in Los Angeles =

Location of Los Angeles in Los Angeles County, California

This is a list of the National Register of Historic Places in the city of Los Angeles. (For those in the rest of Los Angeles County, refer to National Register of Historic Places listings in Los Angeles County, California.)

== Active listings ==
This National Park Service list is complete through NPS recent listings posted October 23, 2026.

	Name on the Register	Image	Date listed	Location	Neighborhood	Description
1	27th Street Historic District	27th Street Historic District	June 11, 2009 (#09000399)	Along 27th Street; 34°01′06″N 118°15′25″W	South Los Angeles	Historic district adjacent to Central Avenue Corridor in South Los Angeles; part of the African Americans in Los Angeles Multiple Property Submission (MPS)
2	52nd Place Historic District	52nd Place Historic District	June 11, 2009 (#09000398)	Along E. 52nd Place; 33°59′41″N 118°15′46″W	South Los Angeles	Historic district in South Los Angeles consisting of American Craftsman homes; part of the African Americans in Los Angeles MPS
3	Al Malaikah Temple	Al Malaikah Temple	April 2, 1987 (#87000577)	655 W. Jefferson Blvd. 34°01′24″N 118°16′49″W	University Park	Landmark large-event venue; headquarters of the Al Malaikah Temple, a division of the Shriners
4	Aloha Apartment Hotel	Aloha Apartment Hotel	December 13, 2018 (#100003238)	6731 Leland Way; 34°05′48″N 118°20′16″W	Hollywood	
5	Alvarado Terrace Historic District	Alvarado Terrace Historic District	May 17, 1984 (#84000783)	Alvarado Terr., Bonnie Brae and 14th Sts. 34°02′42″N 118°16′50″W	Pico-Union	Historic district southwest of downtown with well-preserved mansions built 1902–1907 overlooking park
6	American Trona Corporation Building	American Trona Corporation Building	August 30, 1984 (#84000785)	Pacific Ave. 33°43′03″N 118°17′15″W	San Pedro	Industrial building in San Pedro used to process and store salt potash; built ca. 1917; then part of Fort MacArthur.
7	Andalusia	Andalusia	August 21, 2003 (#03000775)	1471-1475 Havenhurst Dr. 34°05′50″N 118°22′03″W	Hollywood	Courtyard apartment building designed by Arthur and Nina Zwebell in Hollywood
8	Eddie "Rochester" Anderson House	Eddie "Rochester" Anderson House	May 26, 2020 (#100005219)	1932 Rochester Cir. 34°01′16″N 118°18′54″W	Exposition Park	Custom built home of actor Eddie "Rochester" Anderson
9	Angels Flight Railway	Angels Flight Railway	October 13, 2000 (#00001168)	Hill St. 34°03′04″N 118°14′59″W	Downtown Los Angeles	Landmark funicular railway in the Bunker Hill district of Los Angeles
10	Angeles Mesa Branch	Angeles Mesa Branch	May 19, 1987 (#87001005)	2700 W. 52nd 33°59′42″N 118°19′22″W	Crenshaw	Branch library; built in 1929; part of the Los Angeles Branch Library System TR
11	Angelus Funeral Home		March 19, 2009 (#09000146)	1010 E. Jefferson Blvd. 34°00′43″N 118°15′28″W	South Los Angeles	First black-owned business incorporated in California; part of the African Americans in Los Angeles MPS
12	Angelus Temple	Angelus Temple	April 27, 1992 (#92001875)	1100 Glendale Blvd. 34°04′34″N 118°15′40″W	Echo Park	Church seating 5,300 used by evangelist Aimee Semple McPherson in 1920s and 1930s; central house of worship for the International Church of the Foursquare Gospel
13	Army and Navy YMCA		January 12, 2026 (#100012538)	921 S Beacon Street; 33°44′08″N 118°16′50″W		
14	Arroyo Seco Parkway Historic District	Arroyo Seco Parkway Historic District	February 4, 2011 (#10001198)	CA 110 from Four Level Interchange in Los Angeles to East Glenarm St. in Pasadena; 34°03′45″N 118°14′56″W	Downtown Los Angeles to Pasadena	
15	Atchison, Topeka, and Santa Fe Railway Steam Locomotive No. 3751	Atchison, Topeka, and Santa Fe Railway Steam Locomotive No. 3751	October 4, 2000 (#00001178)	2435 E. Washington Blvd. 34°01′07″N 118°13′40″W	Central City East	Restored 4-8-4 steam locomotive; originally owned and operated by the Atchison, Topeka and Santa Fe Railway
16	Avenel Cooperative Housing Project	Avenel Cooperative Housing Project	February 27, 2005 (#05000070)	2839-2849 Avenel St. 34°06′37″N 118°16′03″W	Silver Lake	Ten-unit experiment in cooperative housing designed by Gregory Ain in Silver Lake; built 1947
17	Baldwin Hills Village	Baldwin Hills Village	April 1, 1993 (#93000269)	5300 Village Green; 34°01′12″N 118°21′40″W	Baldwin Hills	627 unit condominium complex; built in the 1930s; one of the first new planned communities
18	Bank of Italy Building	Bank of Italy Building	July 19, 2019 (#100004191)	649 S. Olive St. 34°02′49″N 118°15′19″W	Downtown Los Angeles	1936
19	Banning House	Banning House	May 6, 1971 (#71000160)	401 E. M St. 33°47′25″N 118°15′26″W	Wilmington	Greek Revival mansion built in 1864 by Phineas Banning, the founder of Wilmington; operated as a museum since 1936
20	Aline Barnsdall Complex	Aline Barnsdall Complex	May 6, 1971 (#71000143)	4800 Hollywood Blvd. 34°06′01″N 118°17′36″W	Little Armenia	Includes Hollyhock House, a building designed by Frank Lloyd Wright and built in 1919–1921
21	Battery John Barlow and Saxton		May 4, 1982 (#82002200)	Fort MacArthur; 33°42′58″N 118°17′41″W	San Pedro	United States coastal defense gun emplacement; part of Fort MacArthur
22	Battery Osgood-Farley	Battery Osgood-Farley	October 16, 1974 (#74000526)	Fort MacArthur Upper Reservation; 33°42′42″N 118°17′46″W	San Pedro	United States coastal defense gun emplacement; part of Fort MacArthur
23	Susana Machado Bernard House and Barn	Susana Machado Bernard House and Barn	September 4, 1979 (#79000482)	845 S. Lake St. 34°03′15″N 118°16′48″W	Pico-Union	Gothic Revival mansion in Pico-Union designed by John Parkinson; built 1901
24	Beverly Fairfax Historic District	Beverly Fairfax Historic District	October 4, 2018 (#100002993)	Roughly bounded by N. Gardner & Vista Sts., Beverley Blvd., Rosewood, Melrose & N. Fairfax Aves. 34°04′49″N 118°21′20″W	Fairfax District	
25	Board of Trade Building	Board of Trade Building	January 24, 2008 (#07001439)	111 W. 7th St. 34°02′39″N 118°15′05″W	Downtown Los Angeles	Beaux-Arts high-rise designed by Claud Beelman used as headquarters for California Stock Exchange starting in 1930
26	Henry O. Bollman House		September 23, 2025 (#100012302)	1530 North Ogden Drive; 34°05′57″N 118°21′34″W		
27	Bolton Hall	Bolton Hall	November 23, 1971 (#71000159)	10116 Commerce Ave. 34°15′10″N 118°17′19″W	Tujunga	Built in 1913 as the community center for a Utopian community; later used as Tujunga City Hall, and a local history museum
28	Boulevard Heights Historic District	Boulevard Heights Historic District	September 25, 2012 (#12000809)	658-899 S. Bronson Ave. 34°03′31″N 118°19′10″W	Wilshire Park	
29	Boyle Hotel – Cummings Block	Boyle Hotel – Cummings Block	July 23, 2013 (#13000509)	101-105 N. Boyle Ave. 34°02′51″N 118°13′12″W	Boyle Heights	
30	Bradbury Building	Bradbury Building	July 14, 1971 (#71000144)	304 S. Broadway; 34°03′02″N 118°14′50″W	Downtown Los Angeles	Architectural landmark; built in 1893
31	Bradbury House	Bradbury House	March 10, 2010 (#10000110)	102 Ocean Way; 34°01′39″N 118°31′01″W	Pacific Palisades	
32	The Bricker Building	The Bricker Building	January 7, 2011 (#10001119)	1671 N. Western Ave. 34°06′04″N 118°18′34″W	Hollywood	
33	Eugene W. Britt House	Eugene W. Britt House	May 17, 1979 (#79000483)	2141 W. Adams Blvd. 34°01′59″N 118°18′44″W	West Adams	Colonial Revival mansion built in 1910 in West Adams now headquarters of the LA84 Foundation and the world's premier sports library
34	Broadway Theater and Commercial District	Broadway Theater and Commercial District	May 9, 1979 (#79000484)	300-849 S. Broadway; also 242, 248-260, 249-259, 900-911, 908-910, 921-937, and 930-947 S. Broadway; 34°02′48″N 118°15′04″W	Downtown Los Angeles	First and largest historic theater district on the National Register; with 12 movie palaces in 6 blocks, the largest concentration of movie palaces in the United States. Second set of addresses represents a boundary increase of April 12, 2002
35	Brockman Building and New York Cloak and Suit House (annex)	Brockman Building and New York Cloak and Suit House (annex)	May 21, 2009 (#08001276)	520 W. 7th St. and 708 S. Grand Ave. 34°02′49″N 118°15′24″W	Downtown Los Angeles	The Brockman Building is a 12-story Classical and Romanesque Revival building located in Downtown Los Angeles. Built in 1912, it was listed on the National Register of Historic Places in 2009. It is currently home to an 80 unit condo complex on the top 11 floors, and the restaurant Bottega Louie sits on the 1st floor.
36	Brown Beret Headquarters		October 30, 2020 (#100002654)	2639-41 East 4th St. 34°02′20″N 118°12′30″W	Boyle Heights	
37	Bryson Apartment Hotel	Bryson Apartment Hotel	April 7, 1983 (#83001184)	2701 Wilshire Blvd. 34°03′40″N 118°16′53″W	Mid-City	Built in 1913, its rooftop sign and lions are Wilshire Blvd. landmarks; also closely associated with works of Raymond Chandler and film noir genre
38	Building at 816 South Grand Avenue	Building at 816 South Grand Avenue	December 2, 2004 (#04001075)	816 S. Grand Ave. 34°02′50″N 118°15′30″W	Downtown Los Angeles	Highrise parking garage designed by Claud Beelman and built in 1924; now known as "South Park Lofts"
39	Bullock's Wilshire Building	Bullock's Wilshire Building	May 25, 1978 (#78000685)	3050 Wilshire Blvd. 34°03′40″N 118°17′15″W	Mid-City	Former luxury department store; completed 1929; art deco style; noted for 241-foot (73 m) tower
40	Ralph J. Bunche House	Ralph J. Bunche House	May 22, 1978 (#78000686)	1221 E. 40th Pl. 34°00′37″N 118°15′09″W	South Los Angeles	Boyhood home of 1950 Nobel Peace Prize winner Ralph Bunche, first African American to receive the award
41	Bungalow Court at 1516 N. Serrano Avenue	Bungalow Court at 1516 N. Serrano Avenue	September 16, 2010 (#10000761)	1516–1528½ N. Serrano Ave. 34°05′56″N 118°18′24″W	East Hollywood	
42	Bungalow Court at 1544 N. Serrano Avenue	Bungalow Court at 1544 N. Serrano Avenue	September 16, 2010 (#10000764)	1544–1552 N. Serrano Ave. 34°05′58″N 118°18′24″W	East Hollywood	
43	Bungalow Court at 1554 N. Serrano Avenue	Bungalow Court at 1554 N. Serrano Avenue	September 16, 2010 (#10000762)	1554–1576 N. Serrano Ave. 34°05′59″N 118°18′24″W	East Hollywood	
44	Bungalow Court at 1721 N. Kingsley Drive	Bungalow Court at 1721 N. Kingsley Drive	September 16, 2010 (#10000763)	1721–1729½ N. Kingsley Dr. 34°06′09″N 118°18′14″W	Los Feliz	1721 N. Kingsley Drive are historic bungalow courts built in the Bungalows, Mission Revival and Spanish Colonial Revival styles between 1921 and 1925.
45	Cahuenga Branch	Cahuenga Branch	May 19, 1987 (#87001006)	4591 W. Santa Monica Blvd. 34°05′28″N 118°17′17″W	East Hollywood	Third oldest branch library in city; built in 1916 with grant from Andrew Carnegie; part of the Los Angeles Branch Library System TR
46	The California Club	The California Club	July 6, 2010 (#10000425)	538 South Flower St. 34°05′28″N 118°17′17″W	Downtown Los Angeles	A private club built in 1929-30
47	Campo de Cahuenga	Campo de Cahuenga	December 19, 2003 (#72001602)	3919 Lankershim Blvd. 34°08′24″N 118°21′42″W	Universal City	Adobe farmhouse; site of signing of the Treaty of Cahuenga
48	The Canterbury Apartment Hotel	The Canterbury Apartment Hotel	September 14, 2018 (#100002958)	1746 N Cherokee Ave. 34°06′11″N 118°20′05″W	Hollywood	
49	Capitol Tower	Capitol Tower	September 26, 2024 (#100010883)	1750 N. Vine Street; 34°06′11″N 118°19′34″W	Hollywood	
50	Foster Carling House		April 19, 2016 (#16000168)	7144 West Hockey Trail; 34°07′17″N 118°20′51″W	Hollywood Hills	John Lautner design built 1947-1950
51	Carroll Avenue, 1300 Block	Carroll Avenue, 1300 Block	April 22, 1976 (#76000488)	Carroll Ave. from Edgeware to Douglas St. 34°04′01″N 118°28′11″W	Angelino Heights	Street of Victorian-era houses; often used in movies and TV; includes house used in TV show Charmed
52	Carthay Neighborhoods Historic District		March 1, 2022 (#100007486)	Roughly bounded by South Fairfax Ave., Wilshire, West Pico, and La Cienega Blvds. 34°03′32″N 118°22′10″W		
53	Casa de Rosas	Casa de Rosas	July 14, 2004 (#04000679)	2600 S. Hoover; 34°01′48″N 118°16′55″W	West Adams	Built in 1893, it has housed an experimental kindergarten, a prep school for girls, the headquarters of the Dianetics Foundation, and the Sunshine Shelter for homeless women
54	La Casa Del Rey	La Casa Del Rey	December 13, 2018 (#100003239)	1516 N Hobart Blvd. 34°05′55″N 118°18′20″W	East Hollywood	
55	Case Study House No. 1	Case Study House No. 1	July 24, 2013 (#13000512)	10152 Toluca Lake Ave. 34°08′55″N 118°21′05″W	North Hollywood	One of the Case Study Houses
56	Case Study House No. 9		July 24, 2013 (#13000513)	205 Chautauqua Blvd. 34°01′48″N 118°31′08″W	Pacific Palisades	One of the Case Study Houses
57	Case Study House No. 16		July 24, 2013 (#13000515)	1811 Bel Air Rd. 34°06′09″N 118°26′59″W	Bel Air	One of the Case Study Houses
58	Case Study House No. 18		July 24, 2013 (#13000516)	199 Chautauqua Blvd. 34°01′48″N 118°31′06″W	Pacific Palisades	One of the Case Study Houses
59	Case Study House No. 21	Case Study House No. 21	July 24, 2013 (#13000518)	9038 Wonderland Park Ave. 34°07′00″N 118°23′30″W	Beverly Crest	One of the Case Study Houses
60	Case Study House No. 22	Case Study House No. 22	July 24, 2013 (#13000519)	1635 Woods Dr. 34°06′02″N 118°22′13″W	Hollywood Hills	One of the Case Study Houses
61	S.S. Catalina	S.S. Catalina	September 1, 1976 (#76000495)	Berth 96, Los Angeles Harbor; 33°44′58″N 118°16′23″W	San Pedro	Steamship that transported 25 million people to Santa Catalina Island from 1924 to 1975; foundered in Ensenada in Mexico, 1997; destroyed for scrap, 2009.
62	Catholic-Protestant Chapels, Veterans Administration Center	Catholic-Protestant Chapels, Veterans Administration Center	February 11, 1972 (#72000229)	Eisenhower Ave. 34°03′18″N 118°27′19″W	West Los Angeles	Separate Catholic and Protestant chapels built for residents of the soldiers' home; oldest building on Wilshire Blvd
63	Centinela Adobe	Centinela Adobe	May 2, 1974 (#74000522)	7634 Midfield Ave. 33°58′03″N 118°22′16″W	Westchester	Adobe structure; completed in 1834; "Birthplace of Inglewood"; currently a museum dedicated to Daniel Freeman (Los Angeles County), founder of Inglewood
64	Chateau Colline	Chateau Colline	May 22, 2003 (#03000426)	10335 Wilshire Blvd. 34°04′11″N 118°25′36″W	Westwood	Apartment building dating to 1935 known for its leaded-glass windows, turrets, and climbing vines giving it the appearance of a castle
65	Church of the Epiphany		January 6, 2020 (#100004857)	2808 Altura St. 34°04′31″N 118°12′46″W	Lincoln Heights	Oldest operating Episcopal church in Los Angeles; Cesar Chavez gave speeches in the church hall and La Raza was printed in the church basement.
66	Citrus Square Historic District		October 2, 2024 (#100010884)	Parts of both sides of Sycamore Avenue, Orange Drive, Mansfield Avenue, and Citrus Avenue, from 3rd Street to Clinton Street; 34°04′34″N 118°20′30″W		
67	Mary Andrews Clark Memorial Home	Mary Andrews Clark Memorial Home	October 5, 1995 (#95001152)	306-336 S. Loma Dr. 34°03′36″N 118°15′51″W	Westlake	Large French colonial chateauesque structure built in 1913 as a YWCA home for young working women; donated by William A. Clark as a tribute to his mother
68	Commercial Club		December 28, 2021 (#100007286)	1100 South Broadway; 34°02′22″N 118°15′33″W		
69	Commercial Exchange Building	Commercial Exchange Building	June 26, 2019 (#100004117)	416-436 W. 8th St. 34°02′42″N 118°15′24″W	Downtown Los Angeles	
70	Congregation B'nai B'rith	Congregation B'nai B'rith	December 21, 1981 (#81000154)	3663 Wilshire Blvd. 34°03′45″N 118°18′11″W	Mid-City	Oldest Jewish synagogue in the Los Angeles area; Byzantine dome has been a Los Angeles landmark since 1929
71	Congregation Talmud Torah of Los Angeles	Congregation Talmud Torah of Los Angeles	November 4, 2001 (#01001192)	247 N. Breed St. 34°02′48″N 118°12′31″W	Boyle Heights	Largest Orthodox synagogue in the western United States from 1915 to 1951
72	Crossroads of the World	Crossroads of the World	September 8, 1980 (#80000805)	6671 Sunset Blvd. 34°05′55″N 118°20′05″W	Hollywood	Called America's first modern shopping mall; now hosts private offices; used for location shooting in many films
73	Richard Henry Dana Branch	Richard Henry Dana Branch	May 19, 1987 (#87001007)	3320 Pepper Ave. 34°05′27″N 118°13′18″W	Cypress Park	Former branch library of the Los Angeles Public Library; the building was turned into a community center; part of the Los Angeles Branch Library System TR
74	Felipe De Neve Branch	Felipe De Neve Branch	May 19, 1987 (#87001008)	2820 W. Sixth St. 34°03′46″N 118°16′14″W	Mid-City	Branch library; built in 1929; named after the Spanish governor of California who oversaw the founding of Los Angeles; part of the Los Angeles Branch Library System TR
75	Drum Barracks	Drum Barracks	February 12, 1971 (#71000161)	1053 Carey St. 33°47′05″N 118°15′24″W	Wilmington	Headquarters for the Union Army in the Southern California and the Arizona territory during the Civil War and after; now operated as a Civil War museum
76	Eagle Rock Branch Library	Eagle Rock Branch Library	May 19, 1987 (#87001004)	2224 Colorado Blvd. 34°08′55″N 118°12′51″W	Eagle Rock	Originally a branch library; built in 1915; former Carnegie Library; part of the Los Angeles Branch Library System TR
77	Eames House	Eames House	September 20, 2006 (#06000978)	203 N Chautauqua Blvd. 34°01′39″N 118°31′08″W	Pacific Palisades	Built in 1949 by husband-and-wife design pioneers Charles and Ray Eames; also known as Case Study House No. 8
78	Eastern Star Home	Eastern Star Home	October 9, 2020 (#100004858)	11725 Sunset Blvd. 34°03′53″N 118°28′15″W	West Los Angeles	
79	Ebell of Los Angeles	Ebell of Los Angeles	May 6, 1994 (#94000401)	743 S. Lucerne Blvd. 34°03′42″N 118°19′27″W	Mid-City	Women's club on Wilshire built in 1927; includes 1,270-seat theater where Judy Garland was discovered and where Amelia Earhart made her last public appearance
80	El Cabrillo	El Cabrillo	March 30, 2005 (#05000211)	1832-1850 N. Grace Ave. 34°06′17″N 118°19′52″W	Hollywood	Richly detailed courtyard apartment house designed in Spanish style by Arthur and Nina Zwebell; built in 1928 by Cecil B. DeMille and home of Hollywood celebrities
81	El Greco Apartments	El Greco Apartments	November 3, 1988 (#88002017)	817 N. Hayworth Ave. 34°05′11″N 118°21′44″W	Fairfax District	Spanish Revival apartments built in 1929 in Westwood Village and relocated in 1980s to Fairfax District; former home of Erich von Stroheim, Michael Curtiz and Joel McCrea
82	The Ellison		December 21, 2017 (#100001905)	15 Paloma Ave. 33°59′37″N 118°28′43″W	Venice	
83	Engine Co. No. 27	Engine Co. No. 27	September 24, 1985 (#85002559)	1355 N. Cahuenga Blvd. 34°05′45″N 118°19′44″W	Hollywood	Former Hollywood fire station now houses the Los Angeles Fire Department Museum and the Fallen Firefighters Memorial
84	Engine Company No. 28	Engine Company No. 28	November 16, 1979 (#79000485)	644 S. Figueroa St; 34°02′59″N 118°15′30″W	Downtown Los Angeles	Former fire station converted into a restaurant serving cuisine based on fire station recipes
85	Engine House No. 18	Engine House No. 18	October 29, 1982 (#82000968)	2616 S. Hobart Blvd. 34°01′56″N 118°18′24″W	West Adams	Former firehouse built in 1904; designed in Mission Revival style by John Parkinson
86	Ennis House	Ennis House	October 14, 1971 (#71000145)	2607 Glendower Ave. 34°06′58″N 118°17′30″W	Los Feliz	Designed by Frank Lloyd Wright; built in 1924
87	Executive Office Building, Old Warner Brothers Studio	Executive Office Building, Old Warner Brothers Studio	November 1, 2002 (#02001257)	5800 Sunset Blvd. 34°05′52″N 118°18′59″W	Hollywood	Original studio of Warner Brothers and its executive offices during the 1920s; the location where the first talking motion picture, The Jazz Singer, was filmed
88	Exposition Park Rose Garden	Exposition Park Rose Garden	March 28, 1991 (#91000285)	Exposition Blvd. at Vermont Ave. 34°01′01″N 118°17′06″W	Exposition Park	Sunken rose garden created in the 1920s, featuring more than 20,000 rose bushes and 200 varieties of roses
89	Federal Building	Federal Building	March 9, 2021 (#100006288)	300 North Los Angeles St. 34°03′15″N 118°14′24″W	Civic Center	1965 Welton Becket design; hosts glass mosaics by Richard Haines; site of a 1971 bombing
90	Federal Building	Federal Building	August 17, 2020 (#100005446)	11000 Wilshire Blvd. 34°03′23″N 118°26′54″W	West Los Angeles	
91	Federal Reserve Bank of San Francisco	Federal Reserve Bank of San Francisco	September 20, 1984 (#84000843)	409 W. Olympic Blvd. 34°02′34″N 118°15′31″W	Downtown Los Angeles	Los Angeles branch of the Federal Reserve Bank of San Francisco built in 1929; designed by The Parkinsons in a Moderne style
92	Filipino Christian Church	Filipino Christian Church	January 4, 2019 (#100003291)	301 N. Union Ave. 34°04′04″N 118°15′52″W	Westlake	Part of Asian Americans in Los Angeles, 1850-1980 MPS
93	Fire Station No. 14	Fire Station No. 14	March 17, 2009 (#09000147)	3401 S. Central Ave. 34°00′46″N 118°15′23″W	South Los Angeles	Second of two historically all-black segregated fire stations in Los Angeles; part of the African Americans in Los Angeles MPS
94	Fire Station No. 23	Fire Station No. 23	June 9, 1980 (#80000809)	225 E. 5th St. 34°02′45″N 118°14′48″W	Downtown Los Angeles	Former firehouse built in 1910 with ornate interior; also served as department headquarters and chief's home; used as location in Ghostbusters movies, The Mask, Flatliners and others
95	Fire Station No. 30-Engine Company No. 30	Fire Station No. 30-Engine Company No. 30	March 17, 2009 (#09000148)	1401 S. Central Ave. 34°01′41″N 118°14′50″W	Downtown Los Angeles	First of two historically all-black segregated fire stations in Los Angeles; part of the African Americans in Los Angeles MPS
96	Samuel Freeman House	Samuel Freeman House	October 14, 1971 (#71000146)	1962 Glencoe Way; 34°06′21″N 118°20′14″W	Hollywood	Built in 1922; one of the four textile block houses built by Frank Lloyd Wright in the Los Angeles area
97	Forsythe Memorial School for Girls	Forsythe Memorial School for Girls	June 24, 2015 (#15000359)	506 N. Evergreen Ave. 34°02′42″N 118°11′58″W	Boyle Heights	1914 Spanish Colonial Revival building, also known as Presbyterian School for Mexican Girls
98	500 Varas Square-Government Reserve	500 Varas Square-Government Reserve	March 12, 1986 (#86000326)	Address Restricted; 33°42′43″N 118°17′46″W	San Pedro	Land near the Port of Los Angeles reserved to the federal government in the 19th Century; later became Fort MacArthur.
99	Founder's Church of Religious Science		February 3, 2020 (#100004936)	3281 West Sixth St. 34°03′49″N 118°17′38″W	Koreatown	
100	Morris S. and Nadine E. Frankel House		June 24, 2025 (#100011973)	2146 Westridge Road; 34°04′26″N 118°30′12″W		
101	John C. Fremont Branch	John C. Fremont Branch	May 19, 1987 (#87001009)	6121 Melrose Ave. 34°05′01″N 118°19′59″W	Hollywood	Branch library; built in 1927; part of the Los Angeles Branch Library System TR
102	Friday Morning Club	Friday Morning Club	May 17, 1984 (#84000865)	938-940 S. Figueroa St. 34°02′44″N 118°15′43″W	Downtown Los Angeles	Home for women's club of the same name starting in 1923
103	Eva K. Fudger House		February 24, 2023 (#100008690)	211 South Muirfield Rd. 34°04′16″N 118°19′44″W		
104	Garbutt House	Garbutt House	July 22, 1987 (#87001174)	1809 Apex Ave. 34°05′23″N 118°15′45″W	Silver Lake	20-room mansion with roof and walls built of concrete, steel-reinforced doors and no fireplaces due to the owner's fear of fire
105	Garment Capitol Building	Garment Capitol Building	March 8, 2010 (#10000053)	217 E. 8th St. 34°02′30″N 118°15′06″W	Downtown Los Angeles	
106	Garfield Building	Garfield Building	June 25, 1982 (#82002191)	403 W. 8th St. 34°02′42″N 118°15′18″W	Downtown Los Angeles	Thirteen story Art Deco style historic structure; designed by American architect Claud Beelman; construction lasted from 1928 to 1930
107	General Petroleum Building	General Petroleum Building	June 22, 2004 (#04000621)	612 S. Flower St. 34°02′58″N 118°15′24″W	Downtown Los Angeles	Highrise built in 1949 as offices for oil company; later converted into the Pegasus Apartments
108	Gerry Building	Gerry Building	July 5, 2003 (#03000583)	910 S. Los Angeles St. 34°02′27″N 118°15′11″W	Downtown Los Angeles	Streamline Modern building in Fashion District originally used for garment manufacture
109	Glassell Park Elementary School	Glassell Park Elementary School	April 13, 2007 (#07000309)	2211 West Avenue 30; 34°06′16″N 118°14′01″W	Glassell Park	An active school located at 2211 W. Avenue 30
110	Golden Gate Theater	Golden Gate Theater	February 23, 1982 (#82002192)	5170-5188 E. Whittier Blvd. 34°01′12″N 118°09′24″W	East Los Angeles	A Spanish Churrigueresque-style movie palace built in 1927; subject of preservation battles
111	Golden State Mutual Life Insurance Building	Golden State Mutual Life Insurance Building	June 26, 1998 (#98000712)	4261 S. Central Ave. 34°00′23″N 118°15′21″W	South Los Angeles	Headquarters of one of the city's most successful African American-owned businesses starting in 1927; now a child development center
112	Granada Shoppes and Studios	Granada Shoppes and Studios	November 20, 1986 (#86003320)	672 S. Lafayette Park Pl. 34°03′38″N 118°16′57″W	Mid-City	Complex of courtyard-connected structures built in 1927 combining office, studio, and living space under one roof
113	The Great Wall of Los Angeles	The Great Wall of Los Angeles	September 18, 2017 (#100001602)	Section of Tujunga Flood Control Channel bounded by Oxnard St., Coldwater Canyon & Burbank Blvds. & Coldwater Canyon Rd; 34°10′44″N 118°24′51″W	Valley Glen	
114	Grether and Grether Building		March 27, 2017 (#100000781)	730-732 S. Los Angeles St. 34°02′33″N 118°15′05″W	Downtown Los Angeles	
115	Guaranty Building	Guaranty Building	September 4, 1979 (#79000481)	6331 Hollywood Blvd; 34°05′54″N 118°19′36″W	Hollywood	Beaux-Arts office building on Hollywood Boulevard designed by John C. Austin and completed 1923
116	Edward Alexander Kelley Hackett House	Edward Alexander Kelley Hackett House	May 22, 2003 (#03000428)	1317 S. Westlake Ave. 34°02′43″N 118°16′51″W	Pico-Union	Craftsman-style house built in 1923
117	Hale House	Hale House	September 22, 1972 (#72000230)	Heritage Sq., 3800 N. Homer St., Highland Park; 34°05′18″N 118°12′25″W	Highland Park	Colorful Victorian house, built in 1885, was moved to the Heritage Square Museum in 1972; it has been called "the most photographed house" in Los Angeles
118	Halifax Apartments	Halifax Apartments	October 14, 1998 (#98001242)	6376 Yucca St. 34°06′13″N 118°19′42″W	Hollywood	Apartment building considered "one of the largest and most beautiful" in Hollywood when built in 1923
119	Hangar One	Hangar One	July 30, 1992 (#92000959)	5701 W. Imperial Hwy. 33°56′01″N 118°23′01″W	Westchester	
120	Willis Harpel House	Willis Harpel House	April 19, 2016 (#16000170)	7764 West Torreyson Dr. 34°07′42″N 118°22′00″W	Hollywood Hills West	
121	Leo M. Harvey House		April 19, 2016 (#16000171)	2180 West Live Oak Dr. 34°06′34″N 118°18′42″W	Hollywood Hills	
122	Heinsbergen Decorating Company Building	Heinsbergen Decorating Company Building	September 20, 1984 (#84000873)	7415 Beverly Blvd. 34°04′35″N 118°21′03″W	Mid-Wilshire	Castle-like building occupied by mural-painting business of Anthony Heinsbergen for more than 50 years; built with bricks from the old Los Angeles City Hall
123	Higgins Building	Higgins Building	September 19, 2023 (#100009358)	108 West 2nd St. 34°03′04″N 118°14′42″W		
124	Highland Park Masonic Temple	Highland Park Masonic Temple	January 18, 1990 (#89002268)	104 N. Avenue 56; 34°06′32″N 118°11′37″W	Highland Park	Well-preserved Masonic Temple built in 1923; original Lodge Room with original cherry wood paneling and artwork now used as a banquet facility
125	Highland Park Police Station	Highland Park Police Station	March 22, 1984 (#84000874)	6045 York Blvd. 34°07′08″N 118°11′12″W	Highland Park	Former police station built in 1926; now used as the Los Angeles Police Museum
126	Highland-Camrose Bungalow Village	Highland-Camrose Bungalow Village	March 16, 1989 (#89000198)	Jct. Highland and Camrose Ave. 34°06′30″N 118°20′51″W	Hollywood	Grouping of Craftsman style residential bungalows in Hollywood; later converted to offices for organizations affiliated with the nearby Hollywood Bowl
127	Hogan House		June 3, 2022 (#100007803)	8527 Brier Drive; 34°06′15″N 118°22′38″W		
128	Hollywood Argyle Apartments		December 13, 2018 (#100003240)	2017 N Argyle Ave. 34°06′27″N 118°19′31″W	Hollywood Hills	
129	Hollywood Boulevard Commercial and Entertainment District	Hollywood Boulevard Commercial and Entertainment District	April 4, 1985 (#85000704)	6200-7000 Hollywood Blvd., N. Vine St., N. Highland Ave. and N. Ivar St. 34°06′05″N 118°20′02″W	Hollywood	Landmarks include: Chinese, Egyptian, El Capitan, Warner, and Pantages theaters; Taft, Equitable, Dyas, Guaranty, and First National Bank buildings; Hollywood Masonic Temple; Janes House; Security Trust and Savings
130	Hollywood Bowl	Hollywood Bowl	December 22, 2023 (#100009637)	2301 N. Highland Avenue; 34°06′46″N 118°20′20″W	Hollywood Hills	
131	Hollywood Cemetery	Hollywood Cemetery	May 14, 1999 (#99000550)	6000 Santa Monica Blvd; 34°05′21″N 118°19′05″W	Hollywood	Gravesites include: Don Adams, Mel Blanc (epitaph reads "That's All Folks"), Cecil B. DeMille, Woody Herman, Peter Lorre, Tyrone Power, Bugsy Siegel, Rudolph Valentino and Fay Wray
132	Hollywood High School Historic District	Hollywood High School Historic District	January 4, 2012 (#11000989)	1521 N. Highland Ave. 34°05′57″N 118°20′24″W	Hollywood	
133	Hollywood Masonic Temple	Hollywood Masonic Temple	February 28, 1985 (#85000355)	6840 Hollywood Blvd. 34°06′06″N 118°20′27″W	Hollywood	Built in 1921 for the Hollywood lodge of the Masons; Included billiard room, parlor, ballroom and lodge rooms
134	Hollywood Melrose Hotel	Hollywood Melrose Hotel	July 8, 1992 (#92000834)	5150-70 Melrose Ave. 34°05′00″N 118°18′47″W	Hollywood	
135	Hollywood Palladium	Hollywood Palladium	September 26, 2016 (#16000662)	6215 Sunset Blvd. 34°05′53″N 118°19′26″W	Hollywood	
136	Hollywood Studio Club	Hollywood Studio Club	November 25, 1980 (#80000806)	1215 Lodi Pl. 34°05′35″N 118°19′22″W	Hollywood	YWCA-run boarding house until 1975; occupied at various times by Marilyn Monroe, Ayn Rand, Donna Reed, Kim Novak, Shelley Winters, Rita Moreno, Barbara Eden, and Sharon Tate
137	The Hollywood Western Building	The Hollywood Western Building	July 7, 2015 (#15000378)	5500 Hollywood Blvd. 34°06′04″N 118°18′35″W	Hollywood	
138	Holmes-Shannon House	Holmes-Shannon House	March 26, 2008 (#08000202)	4311 Victoria Park Dr. 34°02′48″N 118°19′42″W	Victoria Park	
139	Bob Hope Patriotic Hall	Bob Hope Patriotic Hall	April 2, 2025 (#100011598)	1816 S. Figueroa Street; 34°02′07″N 118°16′17″W		
140	Hotel Chancellor	Hotel Chancellor	January 3, 2006 (#05001496)	3191 W. Seventh St. 34°03′36″N 118°17′37″W	Mid-City	
141	Hotel Mayfair	Hotel Mayfair	March 18, 2021 (#100006295)	1256 West 7th St. 34°03′08″N 118°16′03″W	Westlake	
142	Hotel Rosslyn Annex	Hotel Rosslyn Annex	August 13, 2013 (#13000589)	112 W. 5th St. 34°02′48″N 118°14′56″W	Downtown Los Angeles	
143	Washington Irving Branch	Washington Irving Branch	May 19, 1987 (#87001010)	1803 S. Arlington Ave. 34°02′22″N 118°19′01″W	Arlington Heights	Former branch library; built in 1926; part of the Los Angeles Branch Library System TR
144	Helen Hunt Jackson Branch	Helen Hunt Jackson Branch	May 19, 1987 (#87001011)	2330 Naomi St. 34°01′07″N 118°15′06″W	South Los Angeles	Former branch library; built in 1926; currently a church; part of the Los Angeles Branch Library System TR
145	Jardinette Apartments	Jardinette Apartments	December 29, 1986 (#86003524)	5128 Marathon St. 34°05′05″N 118°18′36″W	Hollywood	One of the first modernist buildings in the U.S.; designed by Richard Neutra, built 1928
146	Jefferson Branch	Jefferson Branch	May 19, 1987 (#87001012)	2211 W. Jefferson Blvd. 34°01′20″N 118°18′59″W	Jefferson Park	Former branch library; built in 1923
147	A. Quincy Jones Barn		December 26, 2023 (#100009646)	10300 W. Santa Monica Boulevard; 34°03′31″N 118°25′18″W		
148	Judson Studios	Judson Studios	March 25, 1999 (#99000370)	200 S. Avenue Sixty-Six; 34°06′49″N 118°10′43″W	Garvanza	Fine arts studio specializing in stained glass; founded mid 1890s, still operating in 2013
149	Kelton Apartments		January 3, 2020 (#100004856)	644-648 Kelton Ave. 34°03′55″N 118°27′10″W	Westwood	
150	Kerckoff Building and Annex	Kerckoff Building and Annex	August 3, 2005 (#05000774)	558-64 S. Main St. 34°01′05″N 118°14′52″W	Downtown Los Angeles	
151	Morris Kight House		August 29, 2022 (#100007487)	1822 West 4th St. 34°03′39″N 118°16′13″W	Westlake	
152	King Edward Hotel	King Edward Hotel	February 1, 2021 (#100006086)	117-131 East 5th St., 455 South Los Angeles St. 34°02′46″N 118°14′52″W	Downtown Los Angeles	
153	George R. Kress House		September 25, 1998 (#98001196)	2337 Benedict Canyon Dr. 34°06′48″N 118°26′05″W	Benedict Canyon	
154	La Belle Tour	La Belle Tour	January 22, 1988 (#87002291)	6200 Franklin Ave. 34°06′19″N 118°19′24″W	Hollywood	Apartment building in Hollywood; known for many years as "Hollywood Tower"
155	Lane Victory	Lane Victory	December 14, 1990 (#90002222)	Berth 46, Port of San Pedro; 33°42′52″N 118°16′29″W	San Pedro	Second World War Victory ship; preserved as a museum ship
156	Lasky-DeMille Barn	Lasky-DeMille Barn	March 4, 2014 (#14000034)	2100 N. Highland Ave. 34°06′31″N 118°20′10″W	Hollywood	
157	John and Mary Lautner House		April 19, 2016 (#16000172)	2007 Micheltorena St. 34°05′50″N 118°16′13″W	Silver Lake	
158	Lincoln Heights Branch	Lincoln Heights Branch	May 19, 1987 (#87001013)	2530 Workman St. 34°04′34″N 118°12′50″W	Lincoln Heights	Second oldest branch library in Los Angeles; built in 1916 with a grant from Andrew Carnegie; part of the Los Angeles Branch Library System TR
159	Lincoln Place Apartments	Lincoln Place Apartments	December 22, 2015 (#15000911)	Lake & Penmar Aves., Frederick St. & alley to S. 34°00′05″N 118°27′34″W	Venice, Los Angeles	Garden city movement housing built for returning World War II veterans.
160	Lincoln Theater	Lincoln Theater	March 17, 2009 (#09000149)	2300 S. Central Ave. 34°04′34″N 118°12′47″W	South Los Angeles	Large theater built in 1926 catering to LA's African-American community; known as the "West Coast Apollo"; part of the African Americans in Los Angeles MPS
161	Little Tokyo Historic District	Little Tokyo Historic District	August 22, 1986 (#86001479)	301-369 First and 106-120 San Pedro Sts. 34°03′02″N 118°14′22″W	Downtown Los Angeles	Cultural center for Japanese Americans in Southern California
162	Los Altos Apartments	Los Altos Apartments	July 1, 1999 (#99000765)	4121 Wilshire Blvd. 34°03′44″N 118°19′00″W	Mid-City	
163	Los Angeles Central Library	Los Angeles Central Library	December 18, 1970 (#70000136)	630 W. 5th St. 34°03′01″N 118°15′15″W	Downtown Los Angeles	Constructed in 1926; third largest public library in the U.S.; designed to mimic the architecture of ancient Egypt
164	Los Angeles City Hall	Los Angeles City Hall	March 31, 2025 (#100011586)	200 North Spring Street; 34°03′13″N 118°14′35″W		
165	Los Angeles County General Hospital - Acute Unit		July 23, 2026 (#100013242)	1200 N. State Street; 34°03′27″N 118°12′33″W		
166	Los Angeles County Law Library		September 23, 2025 (#100012283)	301 W. 1st Street; 34°03′15″N 118°14′46″W	Downtown Los Angeles	Completed in 1953 with an additional north completed in 1971; the largest county law library in California; second largest law library in the U.S.; late modern style by architecture firm Austin Field and Fry
167	Los Angeles Harbor Light Station	Los Angeles Harbor Light Station	October 14, 1980 (#80000810)	Los Angeles Harbor (San Pedro Breakwater); 33°42′23″N 118°14′53″W	San Pedro	Lighthouse firmly anchored to the concrete block and built of steel reinforced concrete; only lighthouse ever built to this design
168	Los Angeles Memorial Coliseum	Los Angeles Memorial Coliseum	July 27, 1984 (#84003866)	3911 S. Figueroa St. 34°00′51″N 118°17′14″W	Exposition Park	Large outdoor sports stadium; hosted two Olympics; home to the U.S.C. Trojans football team; only stadium to host the Olympic games, World Series and the Super Bowl
169	Los Angeles Nurses' Club	Los Angeles Nurses' Club	May 11, 1995 (#95000581)	245 S. Lucas Ave. 34°03′37″N 118°12′21″W	Westlake	Clubhouse and apartment building for nurses built in 1924 by nurses' club
170	Los Angeles Pacific Company Ivy Park Substation	Los Angeles Pacific Company Ivy Park Substation	March 25, 1981 (#81000155)	9015 Venice Blvd. 34°01′34″N 118°23′32″W	Palms	
171	Los Angeles Plaza Historic District	Los Angeles Plaza Historic District	November 3, 1972 (#72000231)	Roughly bounded by Spring, Macy, Alameda and Arcadia Sts., and Old Sunset Blvd. 34°03′25″N 118°14′16″W	Downtown Los Angeles	Historic district at site of the city's original settlement; includes many of the city's oldest and most historic buildings
172	Los Angeles Union Passenger Terminal	Los Angeles Union Passenger Terminal	November 13, 1980 (#80000811)	800 N. Alameda St. 34°03′22″N 118°14′03″W	Downtown Los Angeles	Opened in 1939; combines Dutch Colonial Revival Style architecture, Mission Revival, and Streamline Moderne style; backdrop for several movies
173	Los Feliz Boulevard Courtyard Apartments Historic District	Los Feliz Boulevard Courtyard Apartments Historic District	March 25, 2024 (#100010099)	Parts of both sides of W. Los Feliz Blvd, from Vermont to Hillhurst Aves; 34°06′40″N 118°17′23″W	Los Feliz	
174	Los Feliz Village Multi-Family Residential Historic District		July 2, 2024 (#100010500)	Both sides of Vermont Ave, from Franklin Ave to Los Feliz Boulevard; 34°06′28″N 118°17′30″W	Los Feliz	
175	Lovell House	Lovell House	October 14, 1971 (#71000147)	4616 Dundee Dr. 34°07′05″N 118°17′13″W	Los Feliz	International style; designed and built by Richard Neutra between 1927–29
176	Lummis House	Lummis House	May 6, 1971 (#71000148)	200 E. Ave. 43; 34°05′35″N 118°12′25″W	Highland Park	Also known as El Alisal, a fanciful rock house built by Charles Lummis in late 19th Century; now operated as a museum.
177	Machell-Seaman House	Machell-Seaman House	June 23, 1988 (#88000922)	2341 Scarff St. 34°01′55″N 118°16′46″W	West Adams	
178	Malabar Branch	Malabar Branch	May 19, 1987 (#87001014)	2801 Wabash Ave. 34°03′02″N 118°11′47″W	Boyle Heights	Branch library; built in 1926; ornamental frieze above entrance; part of the Los Angeles Branch Library System TR
179	Mar Vista Gardens	Mar Vista Gardens	December 31, 2018 (#100003283)	11965 Allin St. 33°59′29″N 118°24′47″W	Del Rey	
180	Maxfield Building		September 18, 2017 (#100001603)	819 S. Santee St. 34°02′28″N 118°15′08″W	Downtown Los Angeles	
181	McCarty Memorial Christian Church	McCarty Memorial Christian Church	January 17, 2002 (#01001456)	4101 W. Adams Blvd. 34°02′06″N 118°19′44″W	West Adams	Gothic Revival church of the Christian Church (Disciples of Christ); founded in 1932 as a white congregation; integrated and became a multi-racial congregation in the mid-1950s
182	Memorial Branch	Memorial Branch	May 19, 1987 (#87001015)	4645 W. Olympic Blvd. 34°03′22″N 118°23′07″W	Mid-Wilshire	Branch library; built in 1930; includes heraldic work of Judson Studios stained glass; part of the Los Angeles Branch Library System TR
183	Menlo Avenue-West Twenty-ninth Street Historic District	Menlo Avenue-West Twenty-ninth Street Historic District	February 12, 1987 (#87000139)	Bounded by Adams Blvd., Ellendale, Thirtieth Ave., and Vermont; 34°01′48″N 118°17′20″W	West Adams	
184	Miller and Herriott House	Miller and Herriott House	November 16, 1979 (#79000486)	1163 W. 27th St. 34°01′50″N 118°17′07″W	University Park	Victorian house built 1890 in North University Park Historic District
185	Million Dollar Theater	Million Dollar Theater	July 20, 1978 (#78000687)	307 S. Broadway; 34°03′03″N 118°14′53″W	Downtown Los Angeles	One of the first movie palaces built in the United States
186	Miracle Mile Apartments Historic District		December 8, 2022 (#100008438)	Roughly bounded by West 3rd St. (alley to south), South La Brea Ave., Wilshire and Hauser Blvds., and West 6th St. 34°04′00″N 118°20′47″W		
187	Mission San Fernando Rey de Convento Building	Mission San Fernando Rey de Convento Building	October 27, 1988 (#88002147)	15151 San Fernando Mission Blvd. 34°16′23″N 118°27′40″W	Mission Hills	Built 1808–1822, the largest adobe building in California and the largest original building at any of the California missions.
188	Moneta Branch	Moneta Branch	May 19, 1987 (#87001016)	4255 S. Olive; 34°00′21″N 118°16′44″W	South Los Angeles	Former branch library; built in 1923; also known as Junipero Serra Branch; part of the Los Angeles Branch Library System TR
189	Montecito Apartments	Montecito Apartments	July 18, 1985 (#85001592)	6650 Franklin Ave. 34°06′18″N 118°20′03″W	Hollywood	Art Deco apartment building home to Hollywood celebrities, including James Cagney, Mickey Rooney, Montgomery Clift and Ronald Reagan; later converted to low-income housing for senior citizens
190	Frederick Mitchell Mooers House	Frederick Mitchell Mooers House	June 3, 1976 (#76000489)	818 S. Bonnie Brae St. 34°03′12″N 118°16′29″W	Westlake	Often been used to illustrate West Coast Victorian architecture; named for owner who discovered Yellow Aster gold mine after years of prospecting in the Mojave Desert
191	Mount Pleasant House	Mount Pleasant House	December 12, 1976 (#76000490)	Heritage Sq., 3800 Homer St. 34°05′17″N 118°12′25″W	Highland Park	
192	John Muir Branch	John Muir Branch	May 19, 1987 (#87001017)	1005 W. 64th 33°58′53″N 118°17′24″W	South Los Angeles	Branch library; built in 1920; part of the Los Angeles Branch Library System TR
193	Municipal Warehouse No. 1	Municipal Warehouse No. 1	April 21, 2000 (#00000386)	2500 Signal St. 33°43′15″N 118°16′17″W	San Pedro	Large landmark warehouse structure built in early 1910s at the Port of Los Angeles;
194	Natural History Museum	Natural History Museum	March 4, 1975 (#75000434)	900 Exposition Blvd. 34°01′01″N 118°17′16″W	Exposition Park	Opened in 1913; fitted marble walls and domed and colonnaded rotunda; often used as filming location
195	Neutra Office Building	Neutra Office Building	March 8, 2004 (#01000075)	2379 Glendale Boulevard; 34°05′59″N 118°15′34″W	Silver Lake	Office building designed by Richard Neutra and used as his studio, 1950–1970; one of the few Neutra commercial buildings (along with Mariners' Medical Arts Complex in Newport Beach) with his original design intact
196	Richard and Dion Neutra VDL Research House II	Richard and Dion Neutra VDL Research House II	May 8, 2009 (#03000774)	2300 Silver Lake Blvd. 34°05′54″N 118°15′38″W	Silver Lake	
197	North Hollywood Branch	North Hollywood Branch	May 19, 1987 (#87001018)	5211 N. Tujunga Ave. 34°09′57″N 118°22′46″W	North Hollywood	Branch library; built in 1930; part of the Los Angeles Branch Library System TR
198	North University Park Historic District	North University Park Historic District	February 11, 2004 (#04000016)	Bounded by Hoover, Adams Blvd, 28th and Magnolia Ave. 34°01′49″N 118°17′04″W	University Park	
199	Nursery School for Visually Handicapped Children		March 31, 2025 (#100011585)	4120 Marathon Street; 34°05′05″N 118°17′25″W		
200	Old Farmdale School		June 3, 2022 (#100007804)	2839 North Eastern Ave. 34°04′48″N 118°10′41″W		
201	Old Santa Susana Stage Road	Old Santa Susana Stage Road	January 10, 1974 (#74000517)	Address Restricted	Chatsworth	Route taken by early travelers through the Santa Susana Mountains between the San Fernando Valley and inland Ventura County
202	James Oviatt Building	James Oviatt Building	August 11, 1983 (#83004529)	617 S. Olive; 34°02′51″N 118°15′14″W	Downtown Los Angeles	
203	Pacific Electric Building	Pacific Electric Building	April 9, 2009 (#09000180)	610 S. Main; 34°02′42″N 118°15′09″W	Downtown Los Angeles	
204	Minnie Hill Palmer House	Minnie Hill Palmer House	September 4, 1979 (#79000480)	Chatsworth Park South; 34°15′40″N 118°36′53″W	Chatsworth	Only remaining Homestead Act cottage in San Fernando Valley; Minnie Hill Palmer born there in 1868 and lived there until 1976
205	Pellissier Building	Pellissier Building	February 23, 1979 (#79000488)	3780 Wilshire Blvd. 34°03′40″N 118°18′28″W	Mid-City	12-story steel-reinforced concrete office tower; on a two story pedestal that contains ground floor retail and the Wiltern theater entrance; blue-green, terra cotta-covered tower; French Zig-Zag Moderne styling
206	Petitfils-Boos House	Petitfils-Boos House	February 15, 2005 (#05000049)	545 Plymouth Blvd. 34°03′51″N 118°19′19″W	Mid-City	
207	Romulo Pico Adobe	Romulo Pico Adobe	November 13, 1966 (#66000211)	10940 Sepulveda Blvd. 34°16′08″N 118°28′03″W	Mission Hills	Built in 1853; oldest residence in the San Fernando Valley; second oldest residence in the City of Los Angeles
208	Pisgah Home Historic District	Pisgah Home Historic District	December 19, 2007 (#07001304)	6026-6044 Echo St. & 6051 A-D Hayes St. 34°06′38″N 118°11′12″W	Highland Park	Site of the Pisgah Home movement begun by faith healer and social reformer; closely aligned with the founding of the modern Pentecostal church
209	Plaza Substation	Plaza Substation	September 13, 1978 (#78000689)	10 Olvera St. 34°03′25″N 118°14′13″W	Downtown Los Angeles	Electrical substation that was part of the "Yellow Car" streetcar system operated by the Los Angeles Railway from 1904 to 1963 Point Fermin Historic District, 807 West Paseo Del Mar, 3601 Gaffey St., San Pedro, MP100006727, LISTED, 7/16/2021
210	Point Fermin Historic District	Point Fermin Historic District	July 16, 2021 (#100006727)	807 West Paseo Del Mar, 3601 Gaffey St. 33°42′19″N 118°17′34″W	San Pedro	
211	Point Fermin Lighthouse	Point Fermin Lighthouse	June 13, 1972 (#72000234)	805 Paseo Del Mar; 33°42′19″N 118°17′34″W	San Pedro	Lighthouse built in 1872 at Point Fermin; now operated as a museum open to the public
212	Portal of the Folded Wings Shrine to Aviation and Museum	Portal of the Folded Wings Shrine to Aviation and Museum	March 18, 1998 (#98000246)	10621 Victory Blvd. 34°11′25″N 118°21′38″W	North Hollywood	Ornate 75-foot (23 m)-high marble arch with mosaic; memorial and burial places of pioneers of aviation
213	Prince Hall Masonic Temple	Prince Hall Masonic Temple	March 17, 2009 (#09000150)	1050 E. 50th St. 33°59′51″N 118°15′26″W	South Los Angeles	Local branch of Prince Hall Masonry; part of the African Americans in Los Angeles MPS
214	Ralph J. Scott	Ralph J. Scott	June 30, 1989 (#89001430)	Berth 85; 33°43′56″N 118°16′30″W	San Pedro	Fireboat attached to the Los Angeles Fire Department; retired in 2003 after 78 years; on display near the Los Angeles Maritime Museum in San Pedro
215	Ralphs Grocery Store	Ralphs Grocery Store	July 30, 1992 (#92000969)	1142-54 Westwood Blvd. 34°03′36″N 118°26′37″W	Westwood	One of the original buildings in Westwood Village in 1929; noted for its cylindrical rotunda; photographed by Ansel Adams
216	Ramsay-Durfee Estate	Ramsay-Durfee Estate	July 24, 1989 (#89000821)	2425 S. Western Ave. 34°02′00″N 118°18′34″W	Adams-Normandie	Tudor Revival mansion designed by Frederick Louis Roehrig and built in 1908; bought by Brothers of St. John of God in 1978
217	Rancho El Encino	Rancho El Encino	February 24, 1971 (#71000142)	16756 Moorpark St. 34°09′36″N 118°28′22″W	Encino	Former Spanish grazing concession, ranch, and stagecoach stop; 19th century adobe and limestone farmhouses still stand near a perennial warm spring
218	Ridgewood Place Historic District	Ridgewood Place Historic District	December 29, 2023 (#100009647)	Both sides North Ridgewood Place, from Beverly Boulevard to 1st Street; 34°04′29″N 118°18′53″W		
219	Frederick Hastings Rindge House	Frederick Hastings Rindge House	January 23, 1986 (#86000105)	2263 Harvard Blvd. 34°02′03″N 118°18′22″W	Adams-Normandie	
220	Will Rogers House	Will Rogers House	February 24, 1971 (#71000149)	14253 Sunset Blvd. 34°03′17″N 118°30′43″W	Pacific Palisades	31-room ranch house; 11 baths; seven fireplaces; surrounded by a stable, corrals, riding ring, roping arena, golf course, polo field; became a State Park in 1944. Destroyed in the January 2025 Southern California wildfires.
221	Roosevelt Building	Roosevelt Building	July 3, 2007 (#07000636)	727 W. Seventh St. 34°01′03″N 118°15′23″W	Downtown Los Angeles	
222	Edward Roybal House		July 10, 2017 (#100001282)	628 S. Evergreen St. 33°58′29″N 118°22′12″W	Boyle Heights	
223	St. Andrews Bungalow Court	St. Andrews Bungalow Court	March 19, 1998 (#98000244)	1514-1544 N. St. Andrews Pl. 34°05′53″N 118°19′16″W	Hollywood	
224	St. Andrews Square Historic District	St. Andrews Square Historic District	December 26, 2023 (#100009648)	Parts of both sides of St. Andrews Place, Gramercy Place, and Manhattan Place from Beverly Boulevard to 3rd Street; 34°04′16″N 118°18′45″W	Hollywood	
225	St. James Park Historic District	St. James Park Historic District	September 27, 1991 (#91001387)	Bounded by 21st and 23rd, Mount St. Mary's College, W.Adams Blvd. and Union Ave. 34°02′00″N 118°16′48″W	University Park	
226	St. John's Episcopal Church	St. John's Episcopal Church	May 5, 2000 (#00000425)	514 W. Adams Blvd. 34°01′38″N 118°16′29″W	University Park	Romanesque Episcopal church; built in 1925
227	The San Fernando Building	The San Fernando Building	July 31, 1986 (#86002098)	400-410 S. Main St. 34°02′52″N 118°15′11″W	Downtown Los Angeles	Renaissance Revival style office building dating to 1906; part of the Old Bank District loft project
228	San Pedro Municipal Ferry Building	San Pedro Municipal Ferry Building	April 12, 1996 (#96000392)	Berth 84-foot (26 m) of 6th St. 33°44′18″N 118°16′40″W	San Pedro	Built in 1941 as a Works Project Administration project; working ferry terminal from 1941 to 1963 for ferry to Terminal Island; Vincent Thomas Bridge was completed connecting the mainland to Terminal Island in 1963; ferry service terminated
229	Santa Fe Coast Lines Hospital	Santa Fe Coast Lines Hospital	January 3, 2006 (#05001499)	610-30 S. Louis St. 34°02′16″N 118°12′31″W	Boyle Heights	Hospital built for employees of Santa Fe Railroad; later known as Linda Vista Hospital
230	Santa Fe Freight Depot	Santa Fe Freight Depot	January 3, 2006 (#05001498)	970 E. 3rd St. 34°02′42″N 118°13′54″W	Downtown Los Angeles	Former freight depot built in 1922, converted in 2000 into campus for architectural school; the quarter-mile long building stretches further than the height of the Empire State Building
231	Sears, Roebuck & Company Mail Order Building	Sears, Roebuck & Company Mail Order Building	April 21, 2006 (#05001407)	2650 E. Olympic Blvd. 34°01′24″N 118°13′15″W	Boyle Heights	Built in 1927, it was a distribution center for Sears mail order business until 1992; the 1,800,000-square-foot (170,000 m^{2}) complex is considered an iconic landmark of the Eastside
232	Second Baptist Church	Second Baptist Church	March 17, 2009 (#09000151)	1100 E. 24th St. 34°01′16″N 118°15′22″W	South Los Angeles	Largest African-American gathering place in the western United States prior to World War II; hosted Martin Luther King Jr. and Malcolm X; part of the African Americans in Los Angeles MPS
233	Second Church of Christ, Scientist	Second Church of Christ, Scientist	April 2, 1987 (#87000576)	946 W. Adams Blvd. 34°02′08″N 118°17′17″W	University Park	Built in 1910; currently owned by the non-profit Art of Living Foundation. Renovations are underway, and the facility is already being used as a community center and center for the organization's operations and outreach.
234	Security-First National Bank of Los Angeles	Security-First National Bank of Los Angeles	March 30, 2005 (#05000213)	5209 Wilshire Blvd. 34°03′45″N 118°20′33″W	Mid-City	Former Art Deco-style bank branch; now occupied by LA City Beat
235	Security Trust and Savings	Security Trust and Savings	August 18, 1983 (#83001204)	6381-85 Hollywood Blvd. 34°06′09″N 118°19′42″W	Hollywood	
236	Smith Estate	Smith Estate	October 29, 1982 (#82000971)	5905 El Mio Dr. 34°06′53″N 118°11′31″W	Highland Park	Victorian home built in 1887 for Superior Court Judge David P. Hatch, who was later a writer on the occult. Later owned by the head of a railroad, and a deputy mayor, and used as the location in the cult film "Spider Baby. The house is also known as "El Mio""
237	Somerville Hotel	Somerville Hotel	January 17, 1976 (#76000491)	4225 S. Central Ave. 34°00′25″N 118°15′21″W	South Los Angeles	Built in 1928; also known as Dunbar Hotel; focal point of the Central Avenue African-American community in the 1930s and 1940s; jazz club opened in early 1930s, welcomed Duke Ellington, Cab Calloway, Billie Holiday, Lionel Hampton, Count Basie and Lena Horne
238	South Bonnie Brae Tract Historic District	South Bonnie Brae Tract Historic District	January 14, 1988 (#87002401)	1026-1053 S. Bonnie Brae St. and 1830-1851 W. Eleventh St. 34°03′00″N 118°16′39″W	Pico-Union	
239	South Serrano Avenue Historic District	South Serrano Avenue Historic District	January 28, 1988 (#87002407)	400 blk. of S. Serrano Ave. 34°03′59″N 118°18′20″W	Mid-City	Historic district of homes in the 400 block of South Serrano Avenue
240	Southern California Gas Company Complex	Southern California Gas Company Complex	June 22, 2004 (#04000623)	800, 810, 820 and 830 S. Flower St. 34°02′48″N 118°15′37″W	Downtown Los Angeles	
241	Southwest Museum	Southwest Museum	March 11, 2004 (#92001270)	234 Museum Dr. 34°06′03″N 118°12′21″W	Mt. Washington	Museum, library, and archive; collections deal with the American Indian, pre-Hispanic, Spanish colonial, Latino, and Western American art and artifacts; opened at this location in 1914; currently closed to bring building up to modern seismic standards
242	John Sowden House	John Sowden House	July 14, 1971 (#71000151)	5121 Franklin Ave. 34°06′20″N 118°18′00″W	Los Feliz	Also known as the "Jaws House"; built in 1926, designed by Lloyd Wright
243	Spring Street Financial District	Spring Street Financial District	August 10, 1979 (#79000489)	354-704 S. Spring St.; also 401 and 405-11 S. Main St. 34°02′48″N 118°14′59″W	Downtown Los Angeles	Once known as the "Wall Street of the West", the old financial district includes the city's first skyscraper and more than 20 other historic buildings along a three-block stretch of Spring; Main Street addresses represent a boundary increase of April 21, 2000
244	Robert Louis Stevenson Branch	Robert Louis Stevenson Branch	May 19, 1987 (#87001021)	803 Spence St. 34°01′40″N 118°11′50″W	Boyle Heights	Branch library; built in 1927; part of the Los Angeles Branch Library System TR
245	Stimson House	Stimson House	March 30, 1978 (#78000690)	2421 S. Figueroa St. 34°01′47″N 118°16′30″W	University Park	Richardsonian Romanesque mansion; built in 1891; originally home of lumber and banking millionaire; survived a dynamite attack by a blackmailer in 1896; later occupied by a brewer, a fraternity house, student housing and a convent
246	Storer House	Storer House	September 28, 1971 (#71000152)	8161 Hollywood Blvd. 34°06′03″N 118°21′57″W	Hollywood Hills	Built in 1923; designed by Frank Lloyd Wright; one of his five Mayan Revival style textile-block houses in the Los Angeles area
247	Strathmore Apartments	Strathmore Apartments	September 25, 2013 (#13000754)	11005-11013 ½ Strathmore Dr. 34°03′55″N 118°27′03″W	Westwood	
248	Streetcar Depot	Streetcar Depot	February 23, 1972 (#72000232)	Pershing and Dewey Aves. 34°03′27″N 118°27′36″W	West Los Angeles	Streetcar depot at the Veterans Affairs Center in West Los Angeles
249	Subway Terminal Building	Subway Terminal Building	August 2, 2006 (#06000657)	417, 415, 425 S. Hill St., 416, 420 424 S. Olive St. 34°03′00″N 118°15′01″W	Downtown Los Angeles	Renaissance Revival building; built in 1925; served as the downtown terminus for the "Hollywood Subway"; currently a luxury apartment building
250	Superior Oil Company Building	Superior Oil Company Building	February 28, 2003 (#03000059)	550 S. Flower St. 34°03′01″N 118°15′22″W	Downtown Los Angeles	
251	Textile Center Building	Textile Center Building	February 15, 2005 (#05000048)	315 E. Eighth St. 34°02′27″N 118°15′01″W	Downtown Los Angeles	Landmark building in the Fashion District developed in 1926 by pioneering female developer, Florence Casler; now converted into condominiums
252	Title Guarantee and Trust Company Building	Title Guarantee and Trust Company Building	July 26, 1984 (#84000891)	401-411 W. 5th St. 34°02′56″N 118°15′03″W	Downtown Los Angeles	Art Deco style highrise building on Pershing Square designed by The Parkinsons; later converted into lofts
253	C.E. Toberman Estate	C.E. Toberman Estate	September 15, 1983 (#83001205)	1847 Camino Palmero; 34°06′20″N 118°20′57″W	Hollywood	Mission Revival mansion built by the "Father of Hollywood", later used as Vincent Chase's trophy house on HBO's Entourage
254	The Town House	The Town House	December 15, 1997 (#96000821)	2959-2973 Wilshire Blvd. and 607-643 S. Commonwealth Ave. 34°03′44″N 118°17′05″W	Mid-City	
255	Twentieth Street Historic District	Twentieth Street Historic District	July 22, 1991 (#91000915)	912-950 20th St. (even numbers); 34°02′09″N 118°16′44″W	University Park	Bungalow and Craftsman style homes in the 900 block of Twentieth Street (south side only)
256	Twenty-eighth Street YMCA	Twenty-eighth Street YMCA	March 17, 2009 (#09000145)	1006 E. 28th St. 34°01′02″N 118°15′26″W	South Los Angeles	Also known as the "Colored YMCA"; provided gymnasium and swimming pool to African-American community in segregated LA; part of the African Americans in Los Angeles MPS
257	US Court House and Post Office	US Court House and Post Office	February 9, 2006 (#06000001)	312 N. Spring St. 34°03′18″N 118°14′33″W	Downtown Los Angeles	National Historic Landmark designation October 16, 2012
258	US Post Office-Hollywood Station	US Post Office-Hollywood Station	January 11, 1985 (#85000130)	1615 N. Wilcox Ave. 34°06′00″N 118°19′50″W	Hollywood	WPA commissioned art deco Post Office Building; designed by Claud Beelman in 1937; dead letter repository for love letters to such Hollywood luminaries as Clark Gable, Judy Garland, and others; part of the US Post Office in California 1900-1941 TR
259	US Post Office-Los Angeles Terminal Annex	US Post Office-Los Angeles Terminal Annex	January 11, 1985 (#85000131)	900 Alameda St. 34°03′30″N 118°14′07″W	Downtown Los Angeles	Mission Revival building designed by Gilbert Stanley Underwood; LA's central mail processing facility from 1940 to 1989; part of the US Post Office in California 1900-1941 TR
260	US Post Office-San Pedro Main	US Post Office-San Pedro Main	January 11, 1985 (#85000132)	839 S. Beacon St. 33°44′11″N 118°16′47″W	San Pedro	Historic Streamline Moderne Post Office built in 1935 as a Works Project Administration project
261	University High School Administration Building		July 15, 2025 (#100012003)	11800 Texas Avenue; 34°02′44″N 118°27′40″W	West Los Angeles	
262	University of Southern California Historic District	University of Southern California Historic District	July 14, 2015 (#15000408)	Roughly bounded by W. Jefferson & W. Exposition Blvds., S. Figueroa St. & McClintock Ave. 34°01′14″N 118°17′05″W	University Park	
263	Van Buren Place Historic District	Van Buren Place Historic District	August 10, 1989 (#89001103)	2620-2657 Van Buren Pl. 34°01′55″N 118°17′45″W	Adams-Normandie	Craftsman style homes built from 1903 to 1916 in 2600 block of Van Buren Place
264	Van Nuys Branch	Van Nuys Branch	May 19, 1987 (#87001019)	14553 Sylvan Way; 34°11′05″N 118°26′59″W	Van Nuys	Former branch library; built in 1926; part of the Los Angeles Branch Library System TR
265	Venice Branch	Venice Branch	May 19, 1987 (#87001020)	610 California Ave. 33°59′28″N 118°28′29″W	Venice	Former branch library; built in 1930; part of the Los Angeles Branch Library System TR
266	Venice Canal Historic District	Venice Canal Historic District	August 30, 1982 (#82002193)	Roughly bounded by Grand, Carroll, Eastern, and Sherman canals 33°59′01″N 118°27′55″W	Venice	Noteworthy for its man-made canals; built in 1905 by developer Abbott Kinney; "Venice in America"
267	Venice of America House	Venice of America House	April 9, 2001 (#00001623)	1223 Cabrillo Ave. 33°59′26″N 118°28′04″W	Venice	
268	Vermont Square Branch	Vermont Square Branch	May 19, 1987 (#87001022)	1201 W. 48th 33°59′59″N 118°17′42″W	South Los Angeles	Oldest branch library; built in 1913; surviving example of a Carnegie library; part of the Los Angeles Branch Library System TR
269	View Park Historic District		July 12, 2016 (#16000434)	Roughly bounded by Mt. Vernon, Enoro, Northland & Northridge Drs., Kenway S. Victoria & Floresta Aves. 33°59′57″N 118°20′58″W	View Park	
270	Villa Bonita	Villa Bonita	September 12, 1986 (#86001950)	1817 Hillcrest Rd. 34°06′17″N 118°20′19″W	Hollywood	
271	Douglas and Octavia Walstrom House		April 19, 2016 (#16000175)	10500 Selkirk Ln. 34°06′40″N 118°26′53″W	Beverly Glen	
272	Warner Brothers Theatre	Warner Brothers Theatre	January 21, 1999 (#98001633)	478 W. 6th St. 33°44′19″N 118°17′29″W	San Pedro	Historic movie palace; opened on January 20, 1931
273	Watts Happening Cultural Center		October 23, 2023 (#100009466)	1827 E. 103rd St. 33°56′36″N 118°14′23″W	Watts	
274	Watts Station	Watts Station	March 15, 1974 (#74000523)	1686 E. 103rd St. 33°56′35″N 118°14′32″W	Watts	Rail station built in 1904 as a stop for the Pacific Electric Railway's "Red Cars"; only building not damaged along "Charcoal Alley" during Watts Riots
275	Watts Towers of Simon Rodia	Watts Towers of Simon Rodia	April 13, 1977 (#77000297)	1765 E. 107th St. 33°56′19″N 118°14′26″W	Watts	Sculpture consisting of 17 connected structures built from found objects by Italian immigrant construction worker Simon Rodia in his spare time from 1921 to 1954
276	West Los Angeles Veterans Affairs Historic District	West Los Angeles Veterans Affairs Historic District	November 19, 2014 (#14000926)	11301 Wilshire Blvd. 34°03′14″N 118°27′14″W	West Los Angeles	
277	Westminster Place Historic District		November 19, 2014 (#100010439)	parts of St. Andrews Place east side, from Wilshire Boulevard to 5th Street; 34°03′49″N 118°18′42″W		
278	Whitley Court	Whitley Court	July 28, 2004 (#04000732)	1720-1728½ Whitley Ave. 34°06′08″N 118°19′56″W	Hollywood	Cluster of Dutch Colonial bungalows designed by architect Oliver P. Dennis in 1919 and a two-story Colonial Revival house built in 1903 just north of Hollywood Boulevard
279	Whitley Heights Historic District	Whitley Heights Historic District	August 19, 1982 (#82002189)	Roughly bounded by Franklin, Highland, Cahuenga, and Fairfield Aves. 34°06′27″N 118°20′03″W	Hollywood	Developed in 1920s in hills above Hollywood; once home to celebrities including Rudolph Valentino, Jean Harlow, Charlie Chaplin, Bette Davis, W.C. Fields and Gloria Swanson
280	Wilmington Branch	Wilmington Branch	May 19, 1987 (#87001023)	309 W. Opp St. 34°03′13″N 118°16′06″W	Wilmington	Branch library; built in 1927; part of the Los Angeles Branch Library System TR
281	Wilshire Branch	Wilshire Branch	May 19, 1987 (#87001024)	149 N. Saint Andrews Pl. 34°04′28″N 118°18′39″W	Mid-City	Branch library; built in 1926; part of the Los Angeles Branch Library System TR
282	Wilshire Vista West Historic District		October 22, 2020 (#100005714)	Roughly bounded by South Fairfax Ave., West San Vicente Blvd., South Spaulding Ave., and Packard St. 34°03′19″N 118°21′46″W	Mid-Wilshire	
283	Warren Wilson Beach House	Warren Wilson Beach House	July 17, 1986 (#86001666)	15 Thirtieth St. 33°58′47″N 118°27′57″W	Venice	
284	Winona Boulevard Mid-Century Modern Historic District	Winona Boulevard Mid-Century Modern Historic District	March 25, 2024 (#100010100)	Both sides Winona Boulevard, Franklin Avenue to Hollywood Boulevard; 34°06′14″N 118°18′08″W		
285	Westlake Theatre	Westlake Theatre	January 7, 2010 (#09001200)	634-642 S. Alvarado St. 34°03′31″N 118°16′32″W	Westlake	Designed by architect Richard M. Bates in the Mission/Spanish Colonial Revival style, updated by architect S. Charles Lee. Extant mural by Anthony Heinsbergen, rooftop neon sign.
286	Wilton Historic District	Wilton Historic District	July 24, 1979 (#79000490)	S. Wilton Pl., S. Wilton Dr., and Ridgewood Pl. 34°04′16″N 118°18′47″W	Mid-City	
287	Woman's Building	Woman's Building	September 29, 2026 (#100013451)	1727 N. Spring Street; 34°04′13″N 118°13′35″W		
288	Woman's Club of Hollywood	Woman's Club of Hollywood	December 27, 2016 (#16000883)	1741-1749 N. La Brea Ave. 34°06′10″N 118°20′45″W	Hollywood	
289	Women's Twentieth Century Club of Eagle Rock	Women's Twentieth Century Club of Eagle Rock	July 30, 2013 (#13000551)	5105 Hermosa Ave. 34°08′22″N 118°12′27″W	Eagle Rock	
290	Yamashiro Historic District	Yamashiro Historic District	September 25, 2012 (#12000811)	1999 N. Sycamore St. 34°06′17″N 118°20′32″W	Hollywood Heights	Built in 1914 by brothers Charles and Adolph Bernheimer to house their collection of Japanese art
291	Young's Market Company Building	Young's Market Company Building	June 15, 2004 (#04000595)	1610 W. Seventh St. 34°03′14″N 118°16′14″W	Westlake	Built in 1920s as a market & office building with marble columns and terra cotta frieze; converted into lofts
292	Ziegler Estate	Ziegler Estate	June 27, 2002 (#02000679)	4601 N. Figueroa Blvd. 34°05′55″N 118°12′16″W	Highland Park	

== Former listings ==
	Name on the Register	Image	Date listed	Date removed	Location	Neighborhood	Description
1	Mission San Fernando Rey de España	Mission San Fernando Rey de España	July 14, 1971 (#71001076)	August 8, 1973	15151 San Fernando Mission Blvd.	Mission Hills	Destroyed by the 1971 San Fernando earthquake, and was completely rebuilt. Not to be confused with the Convento co-located at the site, which was listed on the Register in 1988.
2	Pan-Pacific Auditorium	Pan-Pacific Auditorium	June 16, 1978 (#78000688)	September 27, 1989	7600 W. Beverly Blvd.	Fairfax District	Destroyed by fire May 24, 1989

== See also ==
- Bibliography of California history
- Bibliography of Los Angeles
- Outline of the history of Los Angeles
- List of Los Angeles Historic-Cultural Monuments
- California Historical Landmarks in Los Angeles County, California
- List of National Historic Landmarks in California
- National Register of Historic Places listings in California
