= Warren Wilson Beach House =

Historic house in California, United States

- U.S. National Register of Historic Places
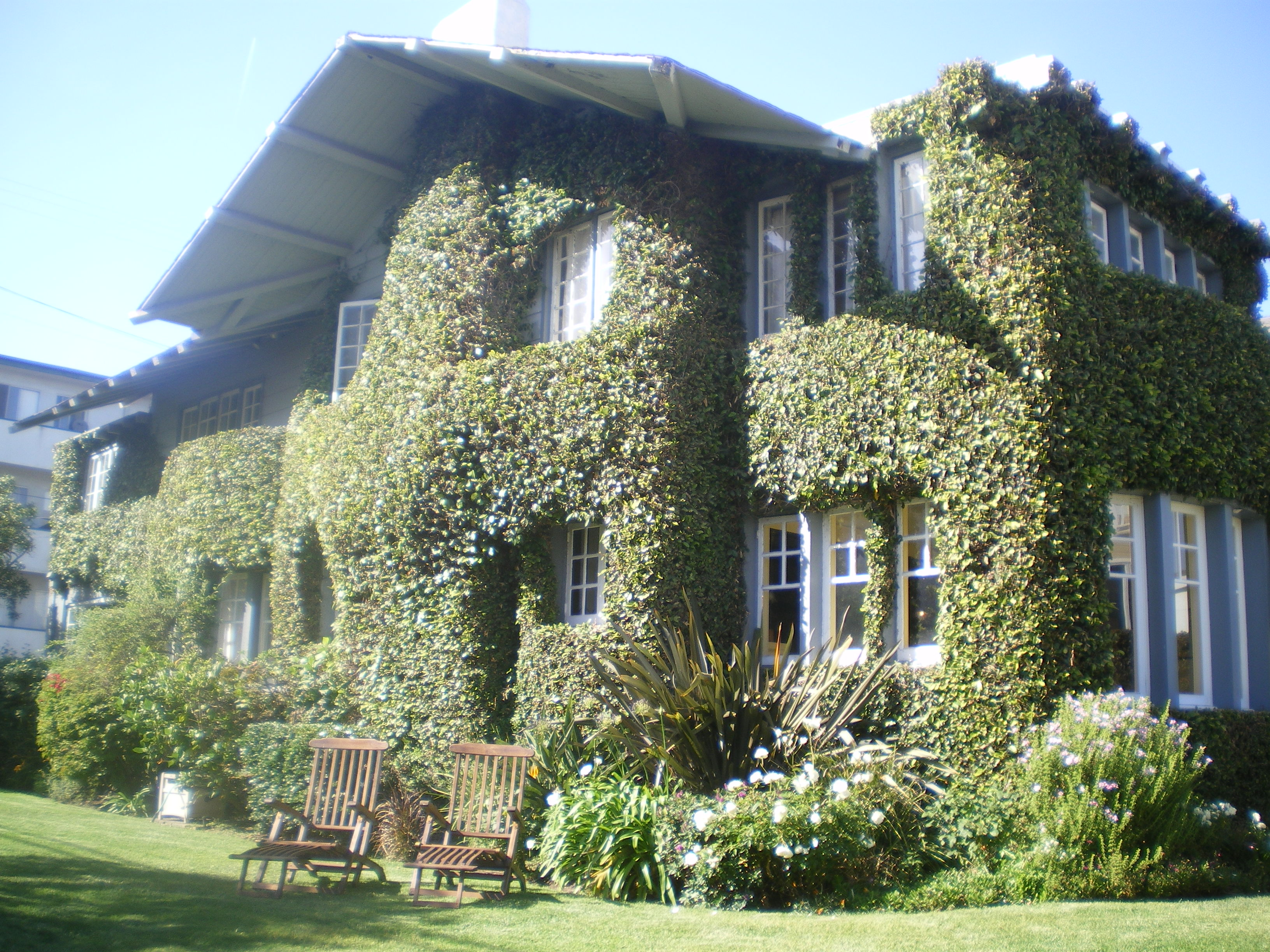
- The Venice Beach House, 2008

- Location within the Los Angeles metropolitan area Location within California Location within the United States
- Location: Venice, California
- Coordinates: 33°58′47″N 118°27′57″W
- Built: 1911
- Architectural style: American Craftsman-Bungalow
- NRHP reference No.: 86001666
- Added to NRHP: July 17, 1986

The Warren Wilson Beach House, later known as The Venice Beach House is a Craftsman style house built in 1911 in the Venice section of Los Angeles, California. It has operated over the years as both a residence and a camp.

The Venice Beach House structure was listed on the National Register of Historic Places in 1986.

== See also ==
- California Bungalow
- Venice, Los Angeles, California
- List of Registered Historic Places in Los Angeles
