= Hotel Rosslyn Annex =

- U.S. National Register of Historic Places
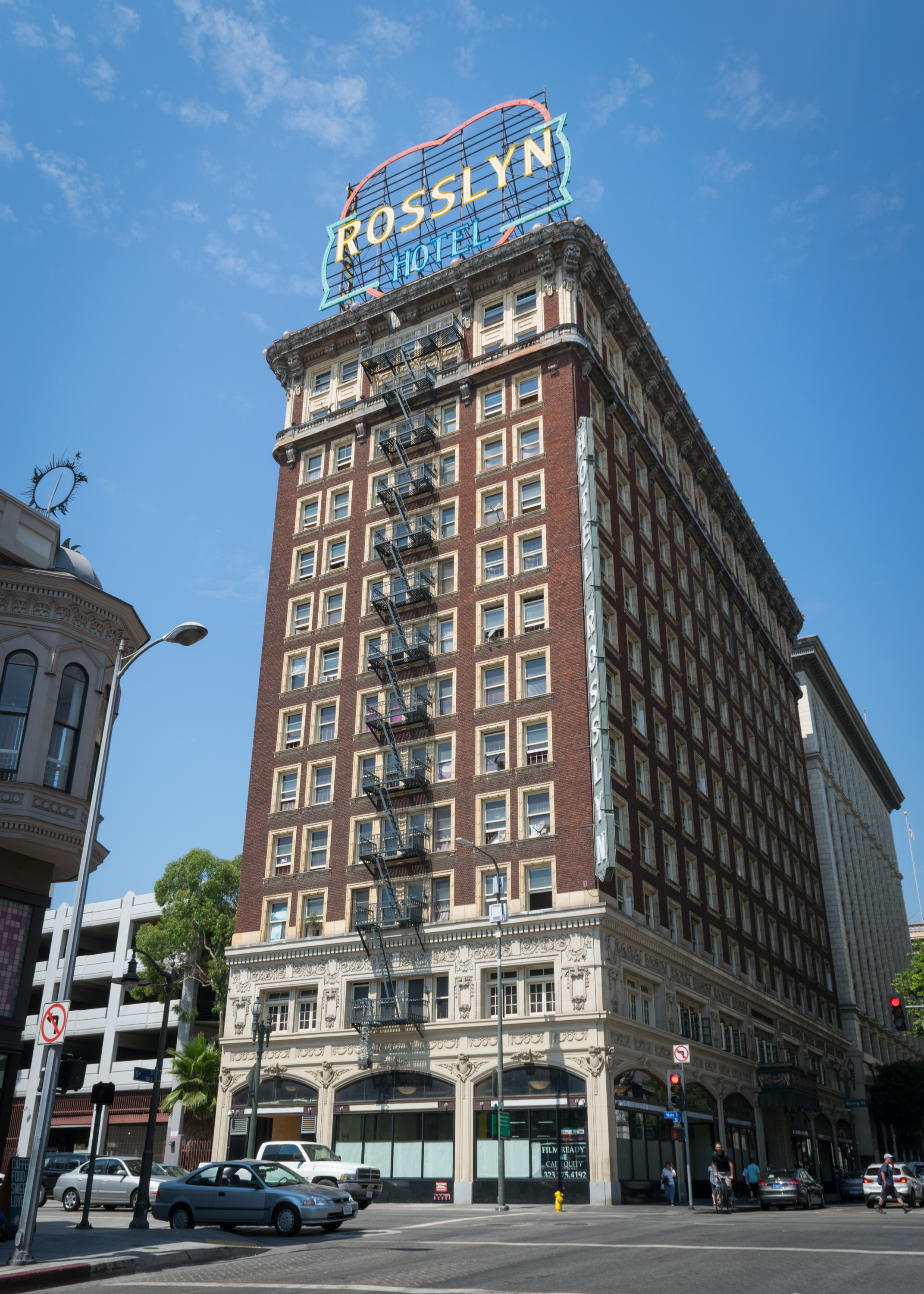
- Southeast side of the Hotel Rosslyn Annex

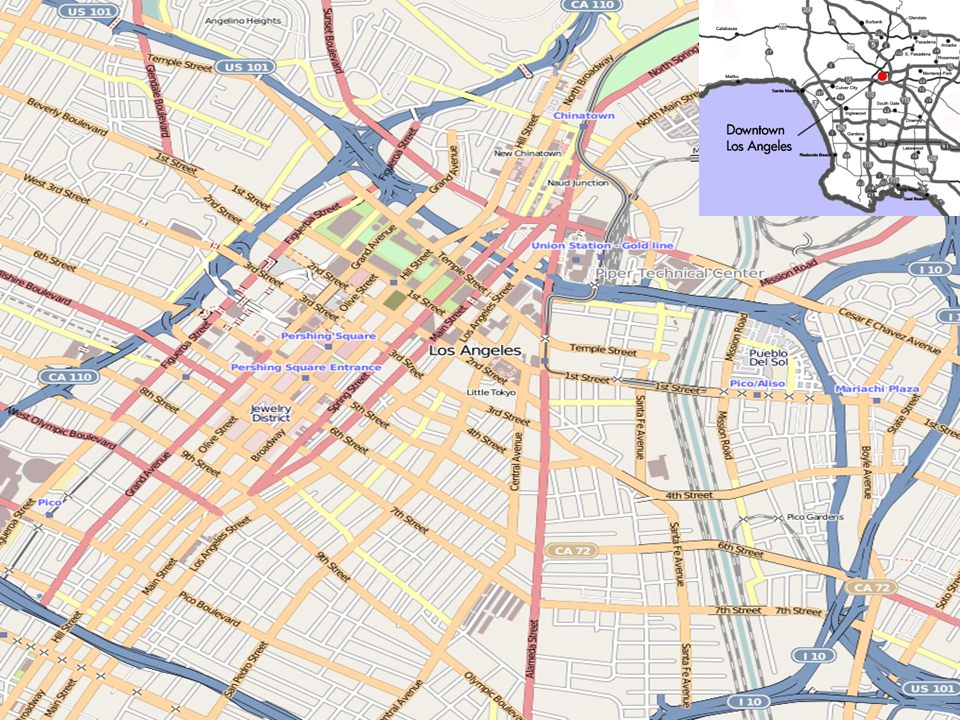
- Location within Downtown Los Angeles
- Location: 112 W. 5th St., Los Angeles, California
- Coordinates: 34.0468°N 118.2489°W
- Built: 1923
- Architect: Parkinson & Parkinson, George Edwin Bergstrom
- Architectural style: Beaux Arts
- NRHP reference No.: 13000589
- Added to NRHP: August 13, 2013

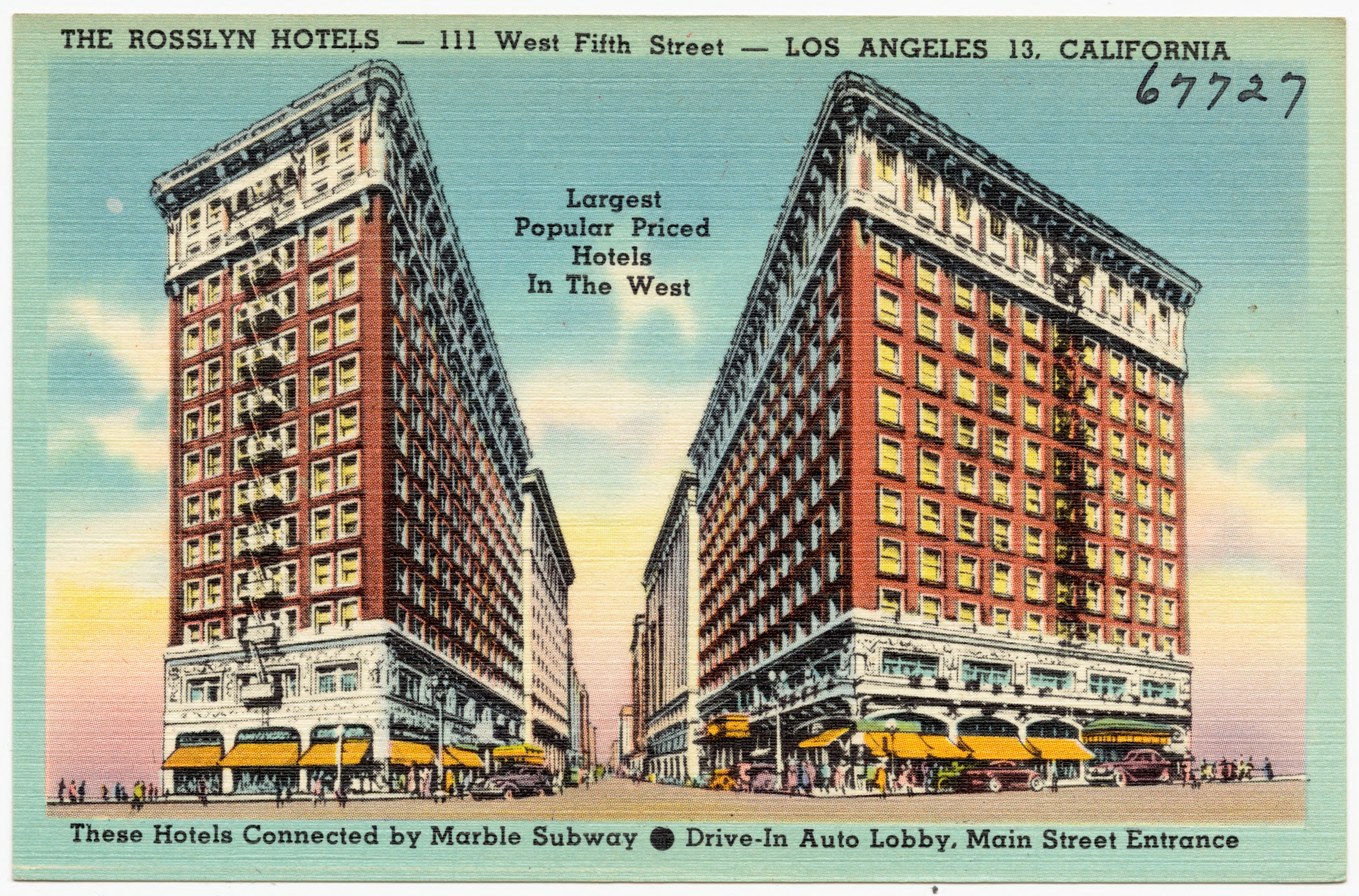
The hotels depicted on a postcard, circa 1930 to 1945

The Hotel Rosslyn Annex is a historic building in Los Angeles, California built in 1923 at the corner of 5th and Main streets. The structure was designed by the firm Parkinson & Parkinson in the Beaux Arts style and listed on the National Register of Historic Places in 2013.

The building is across the street from the original 800-room Rosslyn Hotel built in 1914. Designed as a twin, both were topped by mammoth glowing signs featuring the names surrounded by a heart, the shape acknowledging the Hart brothers who owned the hotels.

The building became famous for its large roof-mounted signboard saying "New Million Dollar Hotel." The hotel closed in 1959, before reopening again in 1979 and eventually focusing on low-price housing. The rooftop sign was featured in the pilot episode of "The Amazing Spider-Man", the music videos for "Where the Streets Have No Name" by U2 and "Interstate Love Song" by Stone Temple Pilots, as well as the 2000 Wim Wenders film "The Million Dollar Hotel". The story of the film had been conceived by U2's lead vocalist Bono while filming the music video, and the filming took place inside the hotel despite its dilapidated state by then.

The 264-unit Hotel Rosslyn Annex was renovated in 2015 to house a mix of homeless veteran, low-income and market-rate tenants.

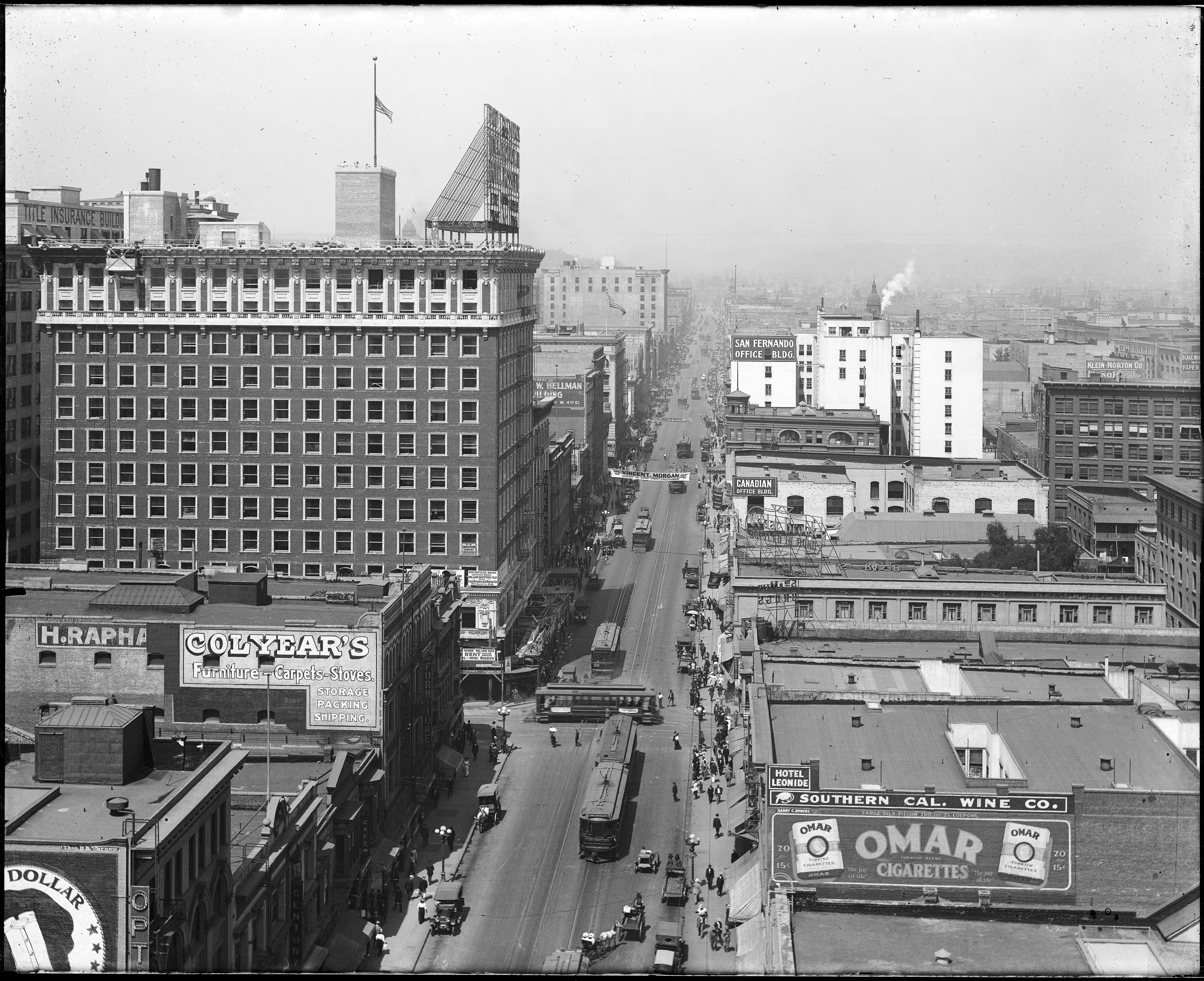
Original Rosslyn building before construction of the second, c. 1917

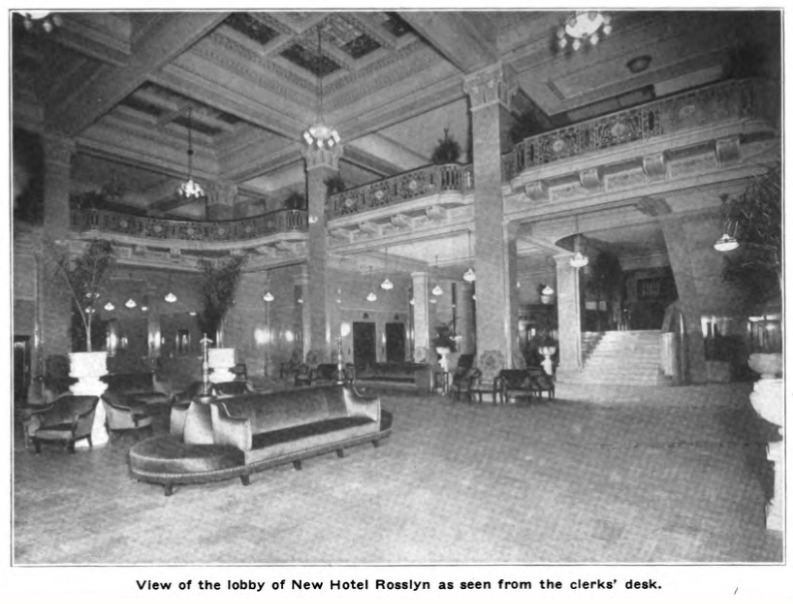
Original building lobby, c. 1917

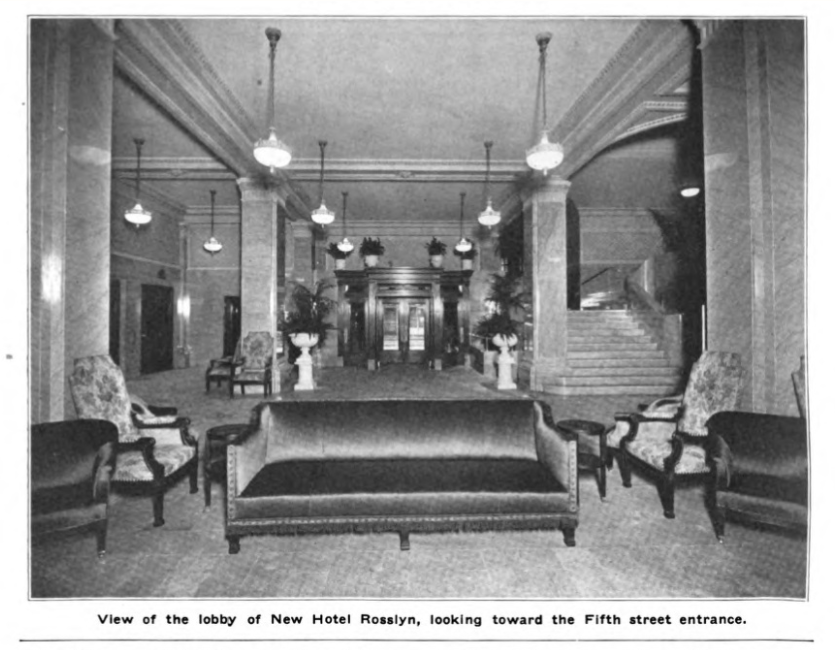
Original building lobby, c. 1917

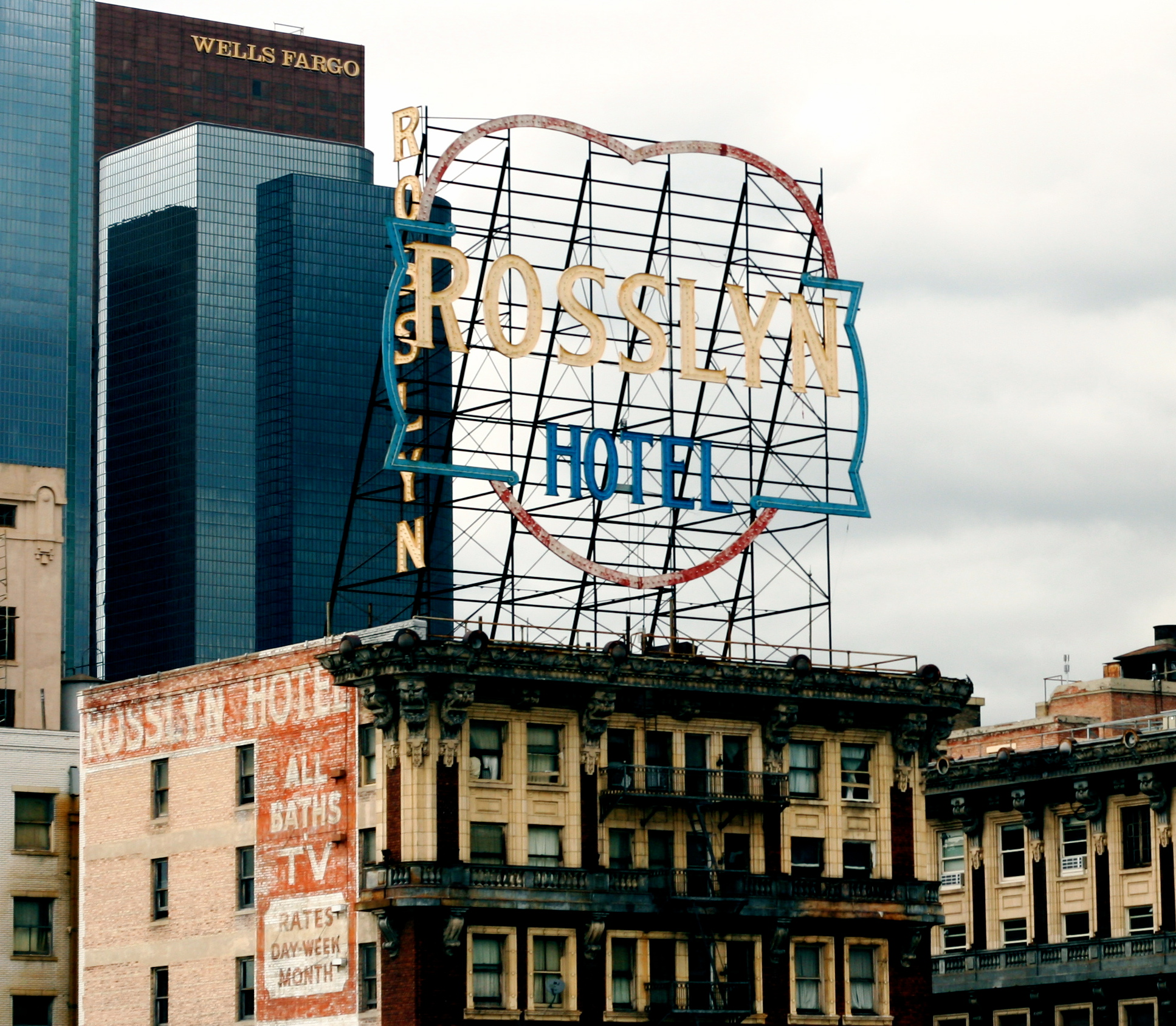

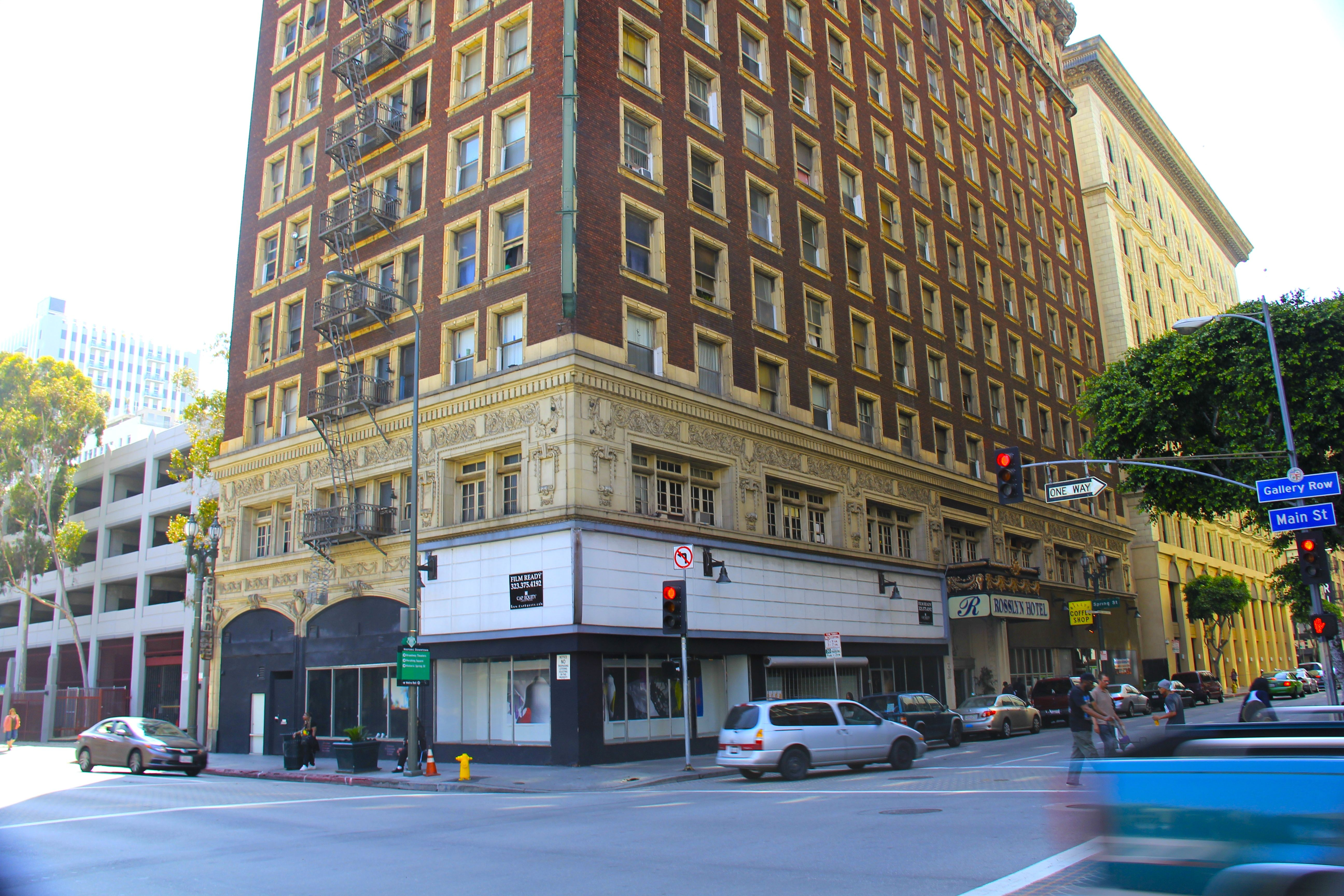

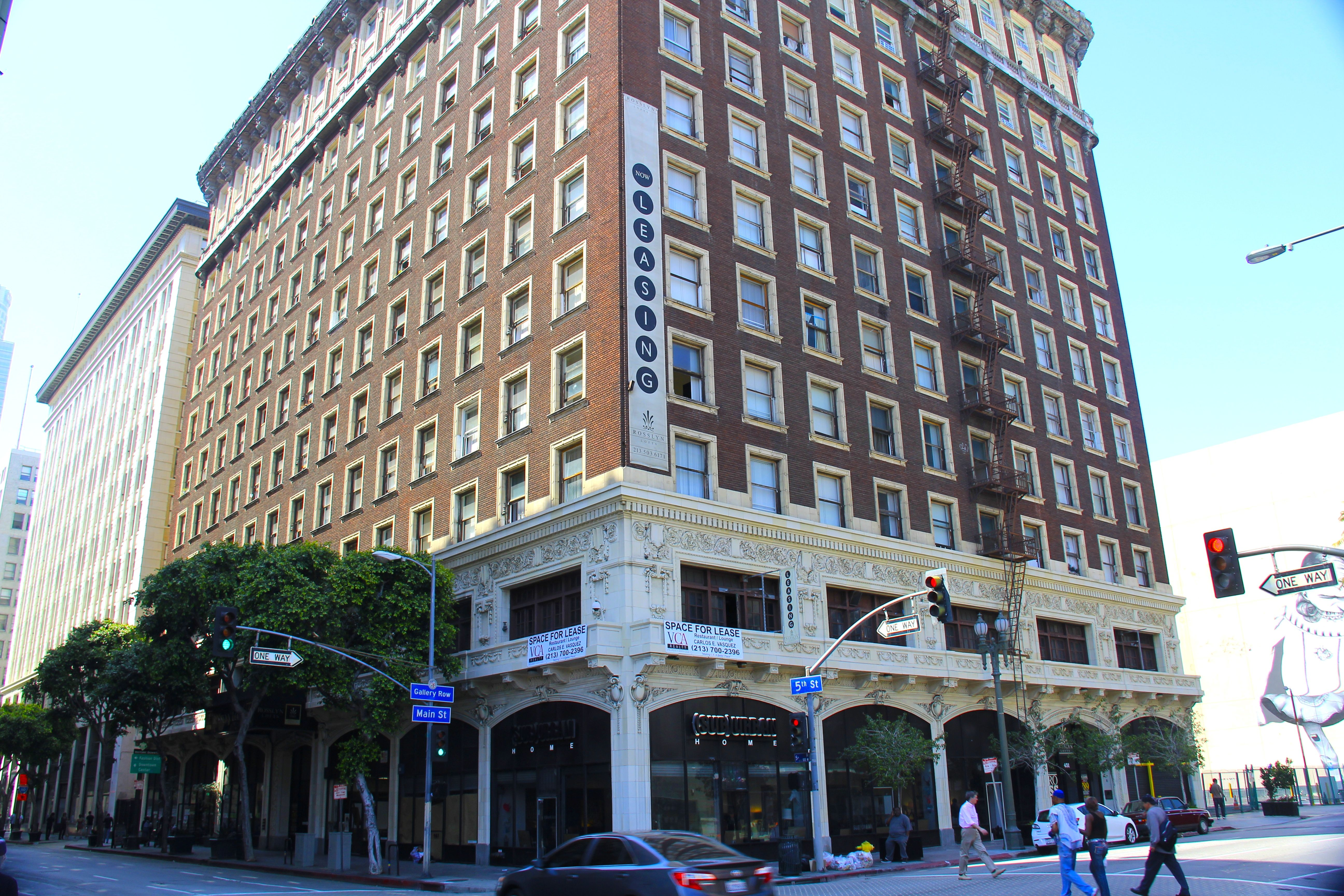

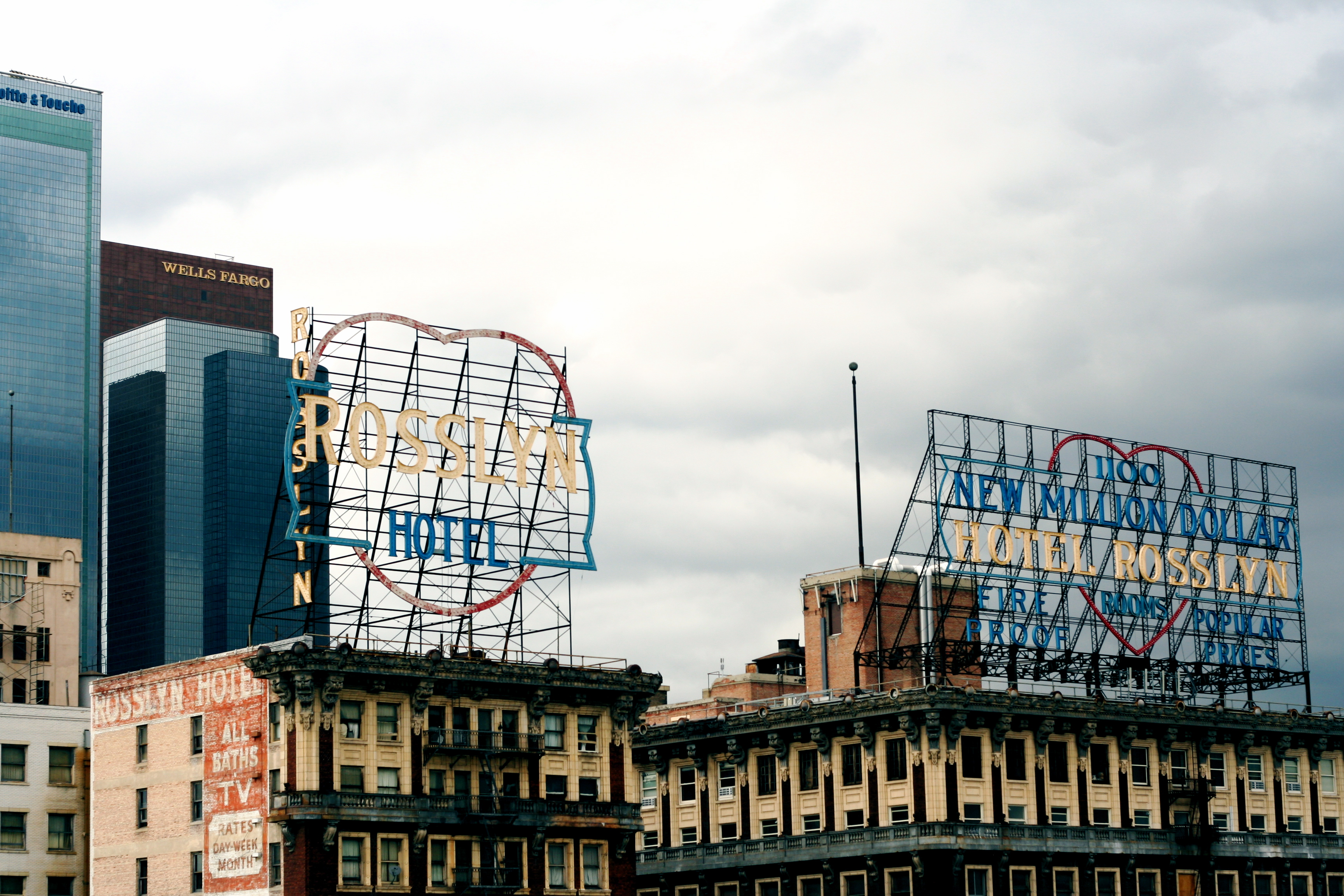

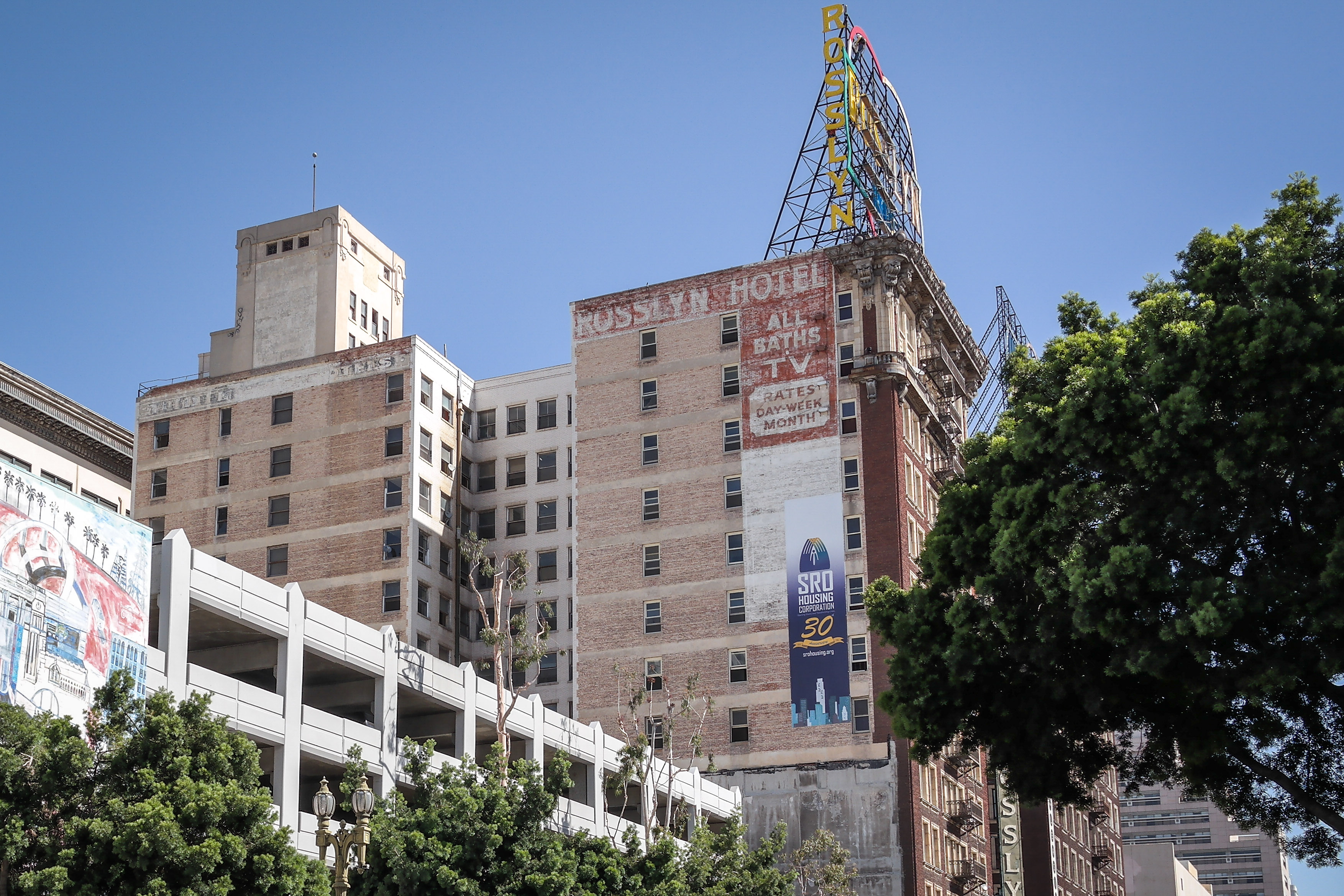

== See also ==
- List of Registered Historic Places in Los Angeles
- The Million Dollar Hotel, a 2000 movie inspired by and filmed at the hotel
