= St. Andrews Bungalow Court =

- U.S. National Register of Historic Places
- U.S. Historic district
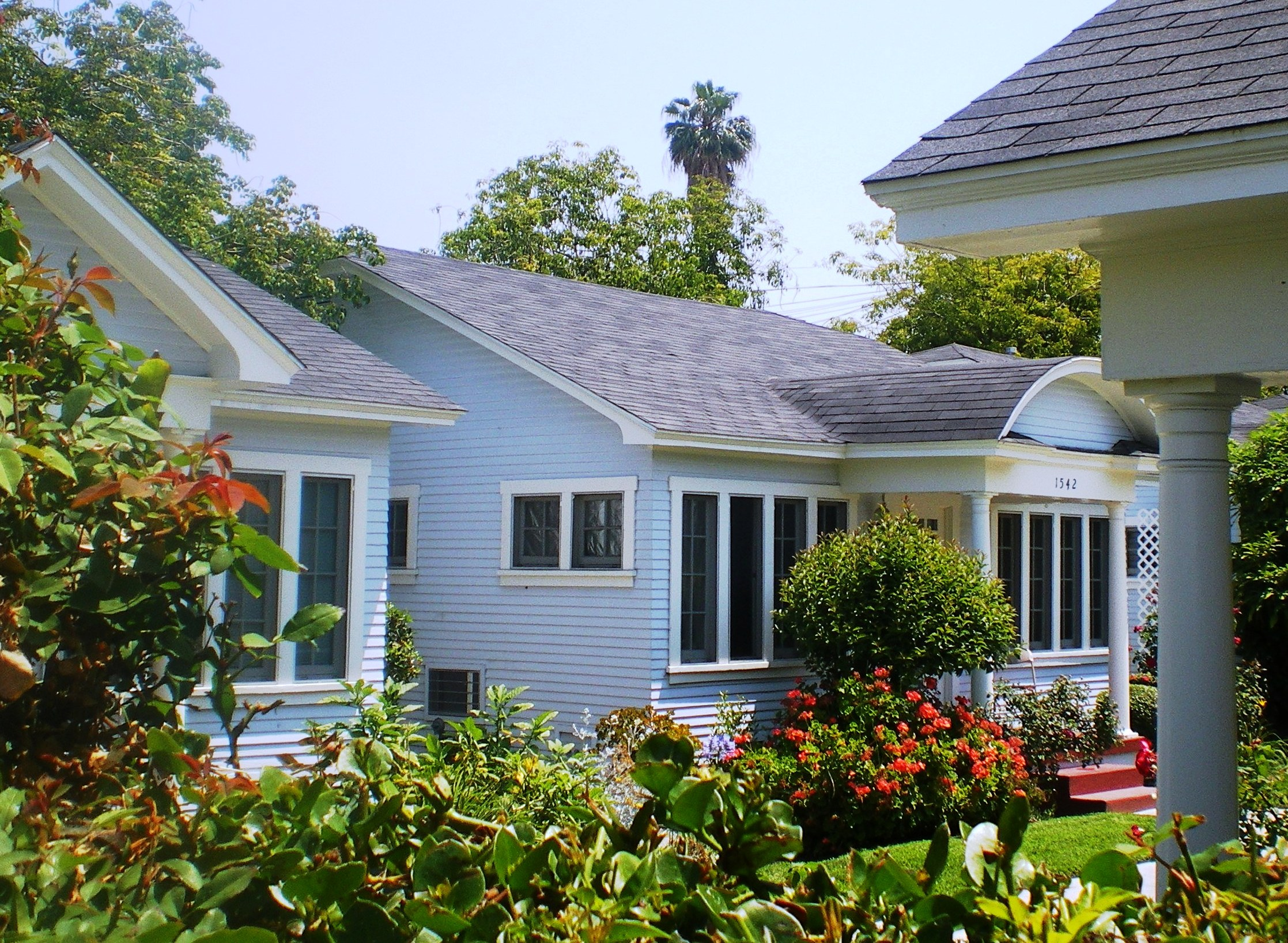
- St. Andrews Bungalow Court, May 2008

- Location within the Los Angeles metropolitan area Location within California Location within the United States
- Location: 1514-1544 N. St. Andrews Pl., Hollywood, Los Angeles, California
- Coordinates: 34°5′53″N 118°19′16″W
- Area: less than one acre
- Built: 1919-20
- Architectural style: Colonial Revival
- NRHP reference No.: 98000244
- Added to NRHP: March 19, 1998

St. Andrews Bungalow Court is a grouping of bungalows built in 1919–20 in the Colonial Revival style in Hollywood, California. Based on the structures' well-preserved multi-family courtyard architecture, the grouping was added to the National Register of Historic Places in 1998. The listing included 15 contributing buildings.

St. Andrews Bungalow Court was featured in the 2007 20th Century Fox movie Alvin and the Chipmunks as well as its 2009 sequel As well as in 2015 sequel.. It served as the home of Dave Seville (played by Jason Lee), one of the main characters of the movie.

It was built as an investment for Fay Sudrow, a widow. It was "an example of an 'owner/builder' construction, a common practice in early Hollywood", in which standard, inexpensive, wood-frame construction was done, without use of an architect or non-essential decorative refinements. Architectural plans for part of the complex might have been purchased from a design service.

== See also ==
- List of Registered Historic Places in Los Angeles
