= Edward Alexander Kelley Hackett House =

Historic house in California, United States

- U.S. National Register of Historic Places
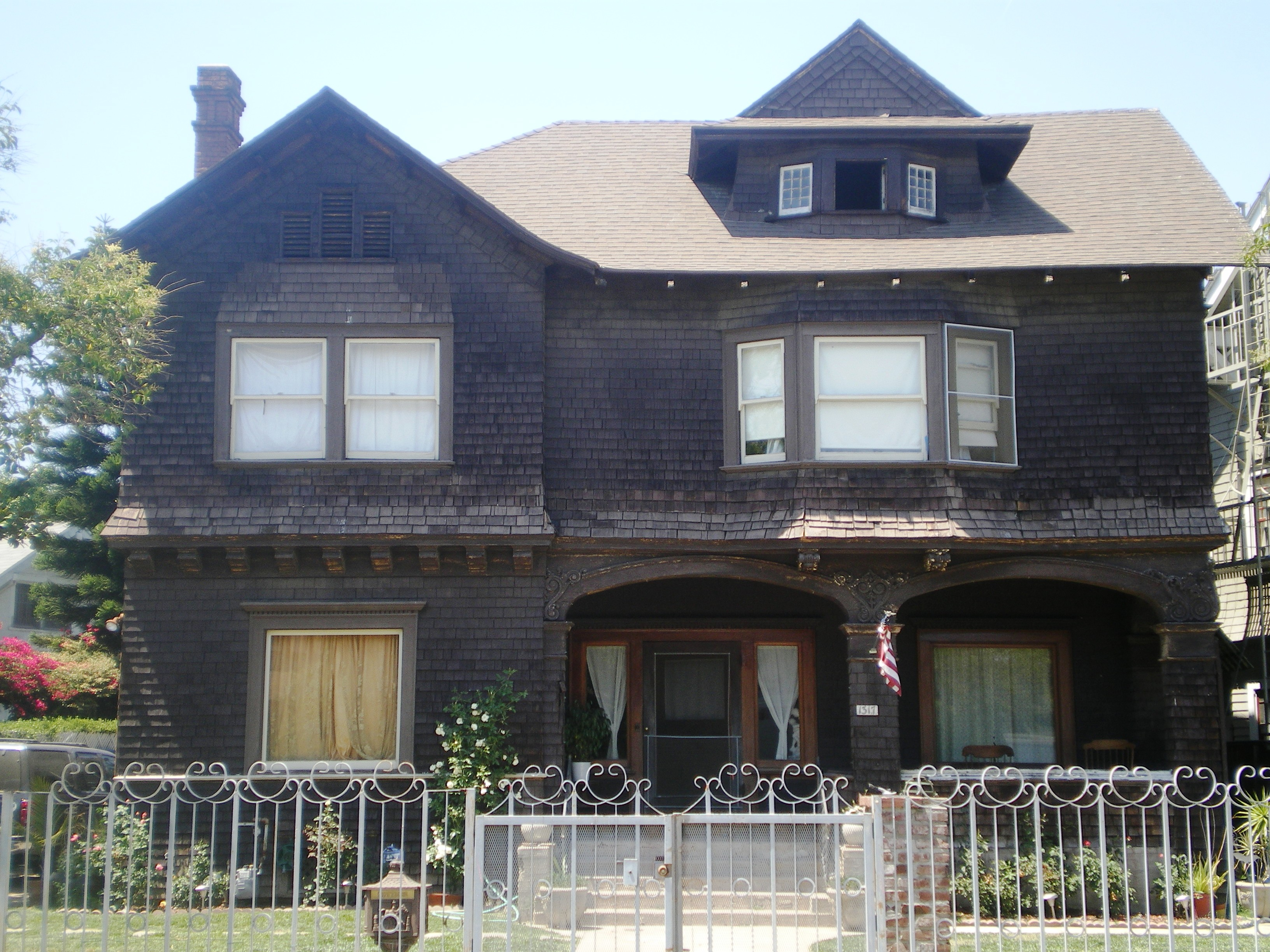
- Edward Alexander Kelley Hackett House, May 2008

- Location within the Los Angeles metropolitan area Location within California Location within the United States
- Location: 1317 S. Westlake Ave., Los Angeles, California
- Coordinates: 34°2′43″N 118°16′51″W
- Built: c.1904
- Architectural style: Arts and Crafts
- NRHP reference No.: 03000428
- Added to NRHP: May 22, 2003

The Edward Aleander Kelley Hackett House is a historic Craftsman-style house in the Pico-Union neighborhood of Los Angeles, California. Built in 1901, the house was added to the National Register of Historic Places in May 2003 based on its well-preserved Craftsman architecture.

It was built around 1904, as possibly the first house built on Westlake Avenue between Alvarado Street and Pico Boulevard. It is a two-and-a-half-story early Arts and Crafts-style house.

== See also ==
- List of Registered Historic Places in Los Angeles
