= List of Los Angeles Historic-Cultural Monuments on the Westside =

This is a List of Los Angeles Historic-Cultural Monuments on the Westside. In total, there are more than 85 Historic-Cultural Monuments (HCM) on the Westside, and a handful of additional sites that have been recognized by the Cultural Heritage Commission for having been designated as California Historical Landmarks or having been listed on the National Register of Historic Places. They are designated by the city's Cultural Heritage Commission.

== Overview of the Westside's Historic-Cultural Monuments ==
As a more recently developed section of the city, the Westside initially lagged behind other parts of the city in the designation of HCMs. In the first 20 years of the Cultural Heritage Commission's existence (August 1962 - August 1982), only three buildings (and three trees or groups of trees) on the Westside were designated as Historic-Cultural Monuments. The three buildings so designated are: (1) Rocha House -- (2) Hangar No. 1 -- the first building constructed at the airfield that later became LAX; and (3) the Ivy Park Substation, an electric generating station for the Pacific Electric Railway located on Venice Boulevard in Palms. Although the city's Westside became a center of wealth and architectural innovation in the mid-20th century, it was not until the 1980s that large numbers of buildings on the Westside began to be recognized as Historic-Cultural Monuments.

== Listing of the Historic-Cultural Monuments ==
HCM #	Landmark name	Image	Date designated	Locality	Neighborhood	Description
13	Rocha House		January 28, 1963	2400 Shenandoah St. 34°02′22″N 118°23′05″W	South Robertson	Residence built in 1865 by Antonio Jose Rocha II on the Rancho Rincon de los Bueyes
19	Moreton Bay Fig Tree		May 10, 1963	11000 National Blvd. 34°01′42″N 118°25′33″W	Palms	Australian fig tree planted in 1875 (See also Santa Barbara's Moreton Bay Fig Tree)
38	Site of Founders Oak		June 15, 1966	Haverford Ave. between Sunset Blvd. and Antioch St.	Pacific Palisades	Coast live oak that played a significant role in founding of Pacific Palisades; cut down in 1975 due to termite infestation
44 (2378)	Hangar No. 1 Building		November 16, 1966	5701 W. Imperial Hwy. 33°55′54″N 118°22′55″W	Westchester	The first structure built at Mines Field (now Los Angeles International Airport) in 1929
148	[[Coral trees (Erythrina afra) Between 26th & Bringham]]		March 3, 1976	San Vicente Blvd.	Brentwood	Coral trees planted along San Vicente Blvd. between 26th St. and Bringham Ave.
182 (2347)	Ivy Park Substation		February 1, 1978	9009-9031 Venice Blvd. 34°01′35″N 118°23′34″W	Palms	Mission Revival electrical substation built in 1907 to provide power for the Los Angeles Pacific Railway
254	Marymount High School (Main Admin. Bldg., Chapel & Auditorium)		September 28, 1982	10643 Sunset Blvd. 34°04′30″N 118°26′43″W	Bel Air	Spanish Colonial style school buildings with Mission elements, designed by Ross Montgomery, dedicated in 1932
259	Loyola Theater		December 17, 1982	8610 S. Sepulveda Blvd. 33°57′34″N 118°23′45″W	Westchester	Baroque Moderne style theater designed by Clarence J. Smale, built in 1948; "Its etched glass doors, ticket booth and interior murals are one-of-a-kind," according to the Cultural Heritage Commission.
270 (2370)	Venice Canal System		July 15, 1983	33°59′04″N 118°27′59″W	Venice	Man-made canals built in 1905 by developer Abbot Kinney as part of his plan to recreate the appearance and feel of Venice, Italy in Southern California.
276	Pacific Palisades Business Block		April 24, 1984	15300-15318 Sunset Blvd. 34°02′50″N 118°31′34″W	Pacific Palisades	Former Santa Monica Land & Water Co. Bldg.; Spanish Colonial structure built in 1924, designed by Clifton Nourse
279	Greenacres (Former Harold Lloyd Estate)		July 24, 1984	101-121 Marymount Pl., 10643-10685 Sunset Blvd.	Bel Air; Beverly Hills	Home of silent film star Harold Lloyd from 1927 to 1971, estate originally included a 44-room mansion, golf course, and 900-foot (270 m) canoe run on 15 acres (61,000 m^{2}).
318	Holmby House		February 3, 1987	1221–1223 Holmby Ave. 34°03′55″N 118°25′46″W	Westwood	Eclectic Mediterranean style duplex built in late 1920s
319	The Grove		March 11, 1987	10669-10683 Santa Monica Blvd. 34°03′10″N 118°25′51″W	Westwood	French Revival cottages in a courtyard setting, designed by Allen Siple
320	Landfair Apartments		May 20, 1987	10940-10954 Ophir Dr. 34°04′05″N 118°27′04″W	Westwood	International style apartments built in 1937, designed by Richard Neutra
324	The Lindbrook		August 14, 1987	10800-10808 Lindbrook Dr. 34°03′38″N 118°26′25″W	Westwood	Mediterranean courtyard apartments built in 1935
351	Strathmore Apartments		April 8, 1988	11005–11013 1/2 Strathmore Dr. 34°03′55″N 118°27′03″W	Westwood	International style apartments designed by Richard Neutra, built in 1937
360 (2376)	Bratskeller - Egyptian Theater (Ralphs Grocery Store)		June 21, 1988	1142–1154 Westwood Blvd., 10885-10887 Lindbrook Dr. 34°03′35″N 118°26′40″W	Westwood	Mediterranean building, originally a grocery store, was one of the original buildings in Westwood Village, built in 1929
361	Fox Bruin Theater		June 21, 1988	926-950 Broxton Ave. 34°03′45″N 118°26′48″W	Westwood	Movie palace with Streamline Moderne marquee designed by noted architect, S. Charles Lee
362	Fox Village Theater		June 21, 1988	945 Broxton Ave. 34°03′45″N 118°26′50″W	Westwood	First movie theater in Westwood Village, built in 1931, designed in Spanish Colonial Revival style by P.P. Lewis
363	Gayley Terrace		June 21, 1988	959 Gayley Ave. 34°03′43″N 118°26′54″W	Westwood	Spanish Colonial Revival apartments built in 1940, designed by Laurence B. Clapp
364	Janss Investment Company Building		June 21, 1988	1045–1099 Westwood Blvd. 34°03′40″N 118°26′44″W	Westwood	Classical style domed structure built in 1929, dome is a Westwood landmark
365	Kelton Apartments		June 21, 1988	644-648 Kelton Ave. 34°03′55″N 118°27′09″W	Westwood	International style apartments built in 1941, designed by Richard Neutra
367	Sheats Apartments		June 21, 1988	10919 Strathmore Dr. 34°04′04″N 118°26′58″W	Westwood	Futurist apartment building designed by John Lautner, built in 1949
368	Elkay Apartments		June 21, 1988	638-642 Kelton Ave. 34°03′55″N 118°27′10″W	Westwood	International style apartment building designed by Richard Neutra, built in 1948
381	The Eames House (Studio and Grounds) (Case Study House #8)		July 15, 1988	203 Chautauqua Blvd. 34°01′48″N 118°31′07″W	Pacific Palisades	Landmark of mid-20th century modern architecture, built in 1949 by design pioneers Charles and Ray (Kaiser) Eames, as their home and studio.
387	Gas Station		September 2, 1988	110 S. Barrington Ave. 34°03′55″N 118°28′11″W	Brentwood	Spanish Colonial style gas station built in 1939, designed by Raymond A. Stockdale
440	Eastern Star Home (including Front Grounds and Courtyard)		May 16, 1989	11725 Sunset Blvd. 34°03′54″N 118°28′17″W	Brentwood	Spanish Colonial Revival home built in 1931, designed by William Mooser and Co. of San Francisco
446	Courtyard Apartment Complex		September 1, 1989	10830 Lindbrook Dr. 34°03′37″N 118°26′29″W	Westwood	Spanish Colonial apartments built in 1936, designed by Frederick Clark
447	Courtyard Apartment Complex		September 1, 1989	10836-10840 Lindbrook Dr. 34°03′37″N 118°26′32″W	Westwood	Monterey Revival apartments built in 1935, part of the planned architecture for Westwood Village
465	Sycamore Trees		October 27, 1989	Bienvenida Ave.		51 sycamore trees planted in 1926 south of Sunset Blvd. to the cul-de-sac
485	Nicolosi Estate		April 6, 1990	414 Saint Pierre Rd.	Bel Air	Mediterranean Revival mansion designed by Paul Williams in 1931, grounds include 300-foot (91 m) serpentine swimming pool
490	SA ANGNA		May 1, 1990	4231-4363 S. Lincoln Blvd.	Marina del Rey	Site was a major village and burial ground, c. 1540, of Gabrielino Indians
506	Tischler Residence		October 9, 1990	175 Greenfield Ave. 34°04′21″N 118°27′23″W	Westwood	International Modern style house built in 1950, designed by Rudolf Schindler
530	John Entenza House (Case Study House)		April 30, 1991	205 Chautanqua Blvd. 34°01′47″N 118°31′07″W	Pacific Palisades	International Modern style home built in 1949, a collaboration between Charles Eames and Eero Saarinen
532	Venice Arcades (including Columns and Capitals)		April 23, 1991	67-71 Windward Ave. 33°59′15″N 118°28′21″W	Venice	Built in 1904 as part of Abbot Kinney's "Venice of America"
547	Camp Joseph Malibu Lodge		October 2, 1991	3000 Rustic Canyon Rd. 34°03′03″N 118°30′35″W	Pacific Palisades	American Craftsman lodge built in 1941 for the Boy Scouts
570	Airport Theme Building		December 18, 1993	201 Center Way; 33°56′39″N 118°24′09″W	Westchester	Landmark space-age structure at LAX built in 1961 with intersecting parabolic arches supporting a disc-shaped restaurant pod
577	Sturges House		May 25, 1993	441-449 Skyewiay Rd. 34°04′00″N 118°28′52″W	Brentwood	One-story home designed in 1939 by Frank Lloyd Wright, the only "Usonian" Wright structure in Southern California
589	Feuchtwanger House - Villa Aurora		February 2, 1994	520 Paseo Miramar; 34°02′46″N 118°33′21″W	Pacific Palisades	Spanish Colonial Revival house built in 1928 for Lion Feuchtwanger; housed an enormous library; refuge for talented emigres.
594	Bradbury House		April 26, 1994	60-102 Ocean Way	Santa Monica	Spanish Colonial Revival adobe residence built c. 1922 from a design by John Byers
595	Venice Division Police Station		April 26, 1994	685 Venice Blvd. 33°59′29″N 118°27′31″W	Venice	Reinforced concrete Art Deco building constructed in 1929, later converted from police station to home of non-profit arts organization SPARC
623	Kappe Residence		April 16, 1996	715 Brooktree Rd. 34°02′29″N 118°30′56″W	Pacific Palisades	House designed in 1969 by architect Raymond Kappe as his own residence, modern design built into a heavily treed hillside
624	Lawrence and Martha Joseph Residence and Apartments		April 16, 1996	3819-3827 Dunn Dr. 34°01′20″N 118°23′56″W	Palms	Storybook/fantasy style residence, sometimes called "Hobbit Houses"
632	Goldenfeld House		February 4, 1997	810 Bramble Way; 34°04′20″N 118°29′07″W	Brentwood	
633	Haas House		February 4, 1997	12404 Rochedale Lane; 34°04′20″N 118°29′06″W	Brentwood	
634	Kalmick House		February 4, 1997	12327 Rochedale Lane; 34°04′23″N 118°29′02″W	Brentwood	
635	Weckler House		February 4, 1997	12434 Rochedale Lane; 34°04′21″N 118°29′10″W	Brentwood	
637	The Campbell Divertimento Fountain		March 18, 1997	1150 Brooklawn Dr.	Bel Air	
647	Sten/Frenke-Gould Residence		December 19, 1997	126 Mabery Rd.	Pacific Palisades	
655	George R. Kress House		September 18, 1998	2337 Benedict Canyon Dr. 34°06′48″N 118°26′05″W	Benedict Canyon	
656	Binoculars Building		October 14, 1998	340 Main St. 33°59′43.48″N 118°28′36.8″W	Venice	
663	Uplifters Clubhouse		August 10, 1999	601 Latimer Rd.	Pacific Palisades	
669	Bailey House - Case Study House#21		November 9, 1999	9038 Wonderland Park Ave.	Bel Air	
680	Mutual Housing Association Site Office		June 6, 2000	990 Hanley Ave. 34°04′35″N 118°29′20″W	Brentwood	
682	Schott House		June 14, 2000	907 N. Hanley Ave. 34°04′27″N 118°29′10″W	Brentwood	
685	Pascual Marquez Family Cemetery		October 17, 2000	631 N. San Lorenzo St.	Pacific Palisades	
693	Israel House		April 24, 2001	914 N. Bluegrass Lane; 34°04′29″N 118°29′07″W	Brentwood	
694	Emmons House		April 24, 2001	661 N. Brooktree Rd.	Pacific Palisades	
695	Gross House		April 24, 2001	860 N. Hanley Ave. 34°04′25″N 118°29′11″W	Brentwood	
696	Jones & Emmons Building		April 24, 2001	12248 W. Santa Monica Blvd. 34°02′22″N 118°27′53″W	West Los Angeles	
697	Kermin House		April 24, 2001	900 N. Stonehill Lane; 34°04′29″N 118°29′05″W	Brentwood	
698	Sherwood House		April 24, 2001	947 N. Stonehill Lane; 34°04′34″N 118°29′05″W	Brentwood	
703	Chateau Colline		July 31, 2001	10341-10335 W. Wilshire Blvd. 34°04′04″N 118°25′37″W	Westwood	
716	Cliff May Experimental House		June 12, 2002	1831 Old Ranch Rd.		
720	Arens House		October 1, 2002	12436 Deerbrook Lane; 34°04′26″N 118°29′07″W	Brentwood	
721	Stoleroff House		October 1, 2002	12367 Deerbrook Lane; 34°04′25″N 118°29′04″W	Brentwood	
722	Volk House		October 1, 2002	12412 W. Deerbrook Lane; 34°04′23″N 118°29′05″W	Brentwood	
723	Wurtele House		October 1, 2002	946 Stonehill Lane; 34°04′34″N 118°29′04″W	Brentwood	
724	Venice of America House		October 1, 2002	1223 Cabrillo Ave. 33°59′26″N 118°28′06″W	Venice	Late Victorian house built in 1906.
731	Westwood Village Memorial Park		May 16, 2003	1218 Glendon Ave. 34°03′30″N 118°26′28″W	Westwood	Burial place of many entertainment industry celebrities, including Marilyn Monroe, Merv Griffin, Rodney Dangerfield and Walter Matthau
745	Durham House		March 28, 2003	1851 Kelton Ave. 34°02′51″N 118°26′17″W	West Los Angeles	
746	Pengelly House		March 28, 2003	1845 Kelton Ave. 34°02′52″N 118°26′17″W	West Los Angeles	
747	Siple House		March 28, 2003	1841 Kelton Ave. 34°02′52″N 118°26′18″W	West Los Angeles	Spanish Colonial Revival design by Allen Siple c. 1930s.
749	Venice City Hall		June 3, 2003	681 E. Venice Blvd. 33°59′26″N 118°27′35″W	Venice	
767	Temple Mishkon Tephilo			206 Main St. 33°59′53.19″N 118°28′41.75″W	Venice	
797	Hamma House		May 4, 2005	12401 W. Deerbrook Lane; 34°04′24″N 118°29′05″W	Brentwood	Also known as Mutual Housing Ass'n; part of a model cooperative community built after World War II from 1947 to 1950
800	Marquez Filling Station	LAHCM 800 Marquez Filling Station, 2022	May 25, 2005	507 Entrada Drive	Pacific Palisades	Gas station built in 1924 and operated continuously until 2004
808	Neutra/Maxwell House		July 8, 2005	475 N. Bowling Green Way; 34°04′03″N 118°28′37″W	Angelino Heights	First peaked roof house designed by Richard Neutra with triangular glazed gable openings, built in 1941; profoundly influenced American suburban architecture in the 1950s and 1960s; moved to Angelino Heights 2007–08
829	James Goldstein Office		December 14, 2005	10100 W. Santa Monica Blvd., Suite 2030; 34°03′41″N 118°25′01″W	Century City	Office suite in 26-story highrise, designed by architect John Lautner in 1987
834	Gustav R. Rich House		January 25, 2006	689 N. Elkins Rd. 34°04′10″N 118°29′25″W	Brentwood	International style modern home built in 1967
862	Miller House		March 7, 2007	12420 West Rochedale Lane; 34°04′23″N 118°29′09″W	Brentwood	
886	Gould-Lafetra House		August 15, 2007	12256 W. Canna Rd. 34°04′54″N 118°29′11″W	Brentwood	Three-story Modern home designed by Raymond Kappe, built in 1968
887	Barry Building		October 2, 2007	11973 W. San Vicente Blvd. 34°03′09″N 118°28′19″W	Brentwood	Office building designed by Milton Caughey, built in 1951 with the geometry and clean lines favored by European modernism and central courtyard with integrated landscaping and two gracefully curving staircases of concrete
893	Castera Residence		October 30, 2007	651 N. Siena Way; 34°4′56.79″N 118°26′45.82″W	Bel Air	Also known as the Castera-Ward Residence; French Provincial concrete house designed by Paul Revere Williams in 1936; longtime home of actress Jane Wyatt
919	UCLAN-Crest Theater		May 14, 2008	1262 South Westwood Blvd. 34°03′27″N 118°26′34″W	Westwood	Art Deco Revival movie theater built in 1940. It was a second-run neighborhood house until 1962, when John Orland, Director of Advertising for Herts Lion International Corp., held the U.S. Premiere of "A Matter of Who," starring Terry Thomas, at the Crest Theater, opening Westwood as a first run venue.
926	Kinney-Tabor House		July 9, 2008	1310 South Sixth Ave.	Venice	American Craftsman style structure built in 1906, originally used as the "Cosmos Club", then as a girls' school, and finally as a home
927	Sturdevant Bungalow		July 9, 2008	721 East Amoroso Pl. 33°59′31″N 118°27′33″W	Venice	American Craftsman style home built in 1914
935	Santa Monica Forestry Station Eucalyptus Grove		October 28, 2008	601 Latimer Rd.	Pacific Palisades	Adjacent to the Rustic Canyon Recreation Center LAHCM #663 Uplifters Clubhouse. Also California Historical Landmark #840.
936	Aldersgate / We Boys J.O.C. Lodge		October 28, 2008	925 N. Haverford Ave. 34°2′56.04″N 118°31′44.69″W	Pacific Palisades	Mission Revival-Craftsman architecture, built in Wilshire in 1910, moved to Temescal Canyon in 1928.
948	Sinay House		March 10, 2009	1861 N. Heather Ct. 34°6′16.78″N 118°24′27.81″W	Beverly Crest	International style, 1947, designed by Richard Neutra.
955	Dickinson and Gillespie Building		May 20, 2009	200 Culver Blvd. 33°57′30.95″N 118°26′53.12″W	Playa del Rey	Spanish Colonial Revival style, built in 1922.
979	Venice West Café		January 27, 2010	321 S. Ocean Front Walk	Venice	Vernacular commercial, built in 1922 on the Venice Boardwalk, important to the counterculture of the 1960s, with poets such as Allen Ginsberg and Jim Morrison.
983	Barsha House		May 12, 2010	302 N. Mesa Rd.	Pacific Palisades	Built 1938, designed by Richard Neutra and P. Pfisterer.

== Non-HCM sites also recognized ==
The LA HCM sites listed above include many of the most important historic sites in the westside area. Some others within L.A. in the area have been listed on the National Register of Historic Places or designated as California Historical Landmarks. These are:

Code	Landmark name	Image	Date designated	Locality	Neighborhood	Description
1003	Tongva Sacred Springs			11800 Texas Ave. 34°02′43″N 118°27′29″W	West Los Angeles	Natural springs located on the campus of University High School; called Kuruvungna by the native Tongva people, who used it as natural fresh water source since 400 BCE; it continues to produce 22,000 - 25,000 gallons of water a day
1003	Will Rogers Estate Historic Park			14253 Sunset Blvd. 34°03′17″N 118°30′45″W	Pacific Palisades	31-room ranch house; 11 baths; seven fireplaces; surrounded by a stable, corrals, riding ring, roping arena, golf course, polo field; became a State Park in 1944
1003	Warren Wilson Beach House			15 Thirtieth St. 33°58′47″N 118°27′57″W	Venice	Craftsman style house built in 1911; operated over the years as both a residence and a camp
2446	Venice Branch Library			610 California Ave. 33°59′28″N 118°28′29″W	Venice	Former branch library; built in 1930
	Wadsworth Chapel			Eisenhower Ave. 34°03′18″N 118°27′19″W	Sawtelle	Separate Catholic and Protestant chapels built for residents of the soldiers' home; oldest building on Wilshire Blvd.
	Streetcar Depot, West Los Angeles			Pershing and Dewey Aves. 34°03′26″N 118°27′36″W	Sawtelle	Streetcar depot at the Veterans Affairs Center in West Los Angeles
	Centinela Adobe			7634 Midfield Ave. 33°58′3.43″N 118°22′22.4″W	Westchester	Adobe structure; completed in 1834; "Birthplace of Inglewood"; currently a museum dedicated to Daniel Freeman, founder of Inglewood

== See also ==
- Bibliography of Los Angeles
- Outline of the history of Los Angeles
- Bibliography of California history

=== Lists of L.A. Historic-Cultural Monuments ===
- Historic-Cultural Monuments in Downtown Los Angeles
- Historic-Cultural Monuments on the East and Northeast Sides
- Historic-Cultural Monuments in the Harbor area
- Historic-Cultural Monuments in Hollywood
- Historic-Cultural Monuments in the San Fernando Valley
- Historic-Cultural Monuments in Silver Lake, Angelino Heights, and Echo Park
- Historic-Cultural Monuments in South Los Angeles
- Historic-Cultural Monuments in the Wilshire and Westlake areas

=== Other ===
- City of Los Angeles' Historic Preservation Overlay Zones
- National Register of Historic Places listings in Los Angeles
- National Register of Historic Places listings in Los Angeles County
- List of California Historical Landmarks
