= Bradbury House =

"Bradbury House" can refer to:

- Bradbury House (Los Angeles), a Spanish Colonial Revival adobe residence in Santa Monica, California, built c. 1922 from a design by John Byers.
- A dormitory at The University of Chicago.
- Bradbury House, Wrexham, building in Wrexham, Wales.
