= Moreton Bay Fig Tree (Los Angeles, California) =

Landmark tree in California

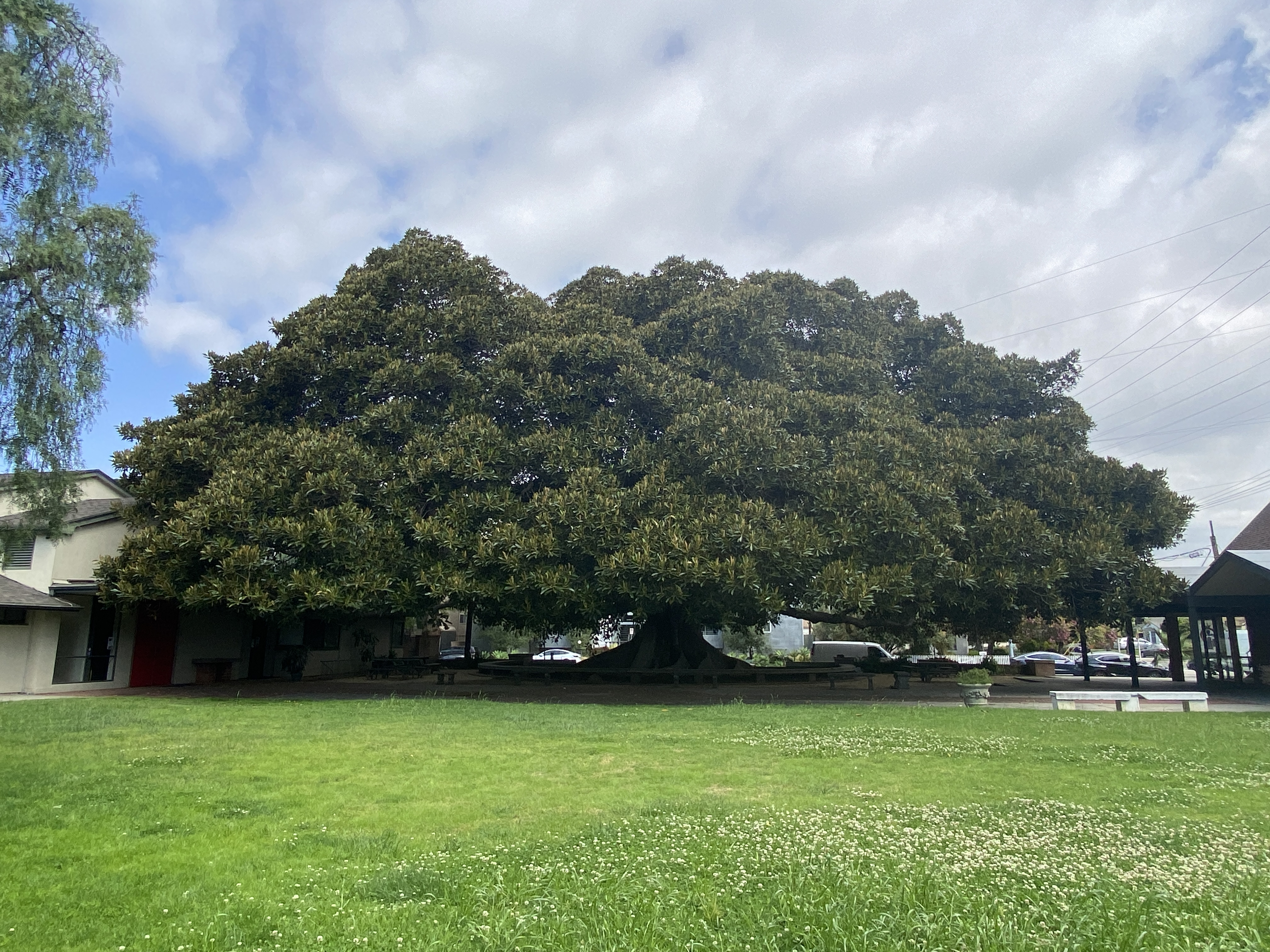
- Ficus macrophylla
- Location: 11000 National Blvd. Palms, Los Angeles, California; United States
- Coordinates: 34°01′42″N 118°25′33″W
- Formed: 1875

Los Angeles Historic-Cultural Monument
- Designated: 1963
- Reference no.: 19

The Moreton Bay fig tree in the Palms neighborhood of Los Angeles is a large Ficus macrophylla (commonly known as the Moreton Bay fig or Australian banyan) tree that was planted in 1875 and landmarked in 1963. The St. John's Presbyterian Church complex around the tree was established in 1962.

The historical site plaque is “at the intersection of National Boulevard and Military Avenue, on the right when traveling east on National Boulevard.”

There are several other monumental Moreton Bay fig trees in Los Angeles County, including at the Fairmont Miramar hotel in Santa Monica, the Auto Club building downtown and at USC.

== See also ==
- Moreton Bay fig (Balboa Park)
- Moreton Bay Fig Tree (Santa Barbara)
- List of Los Angeles Historic-Cultural Monuments on the Westside
