= Pascual Márquez Family Cemetery =

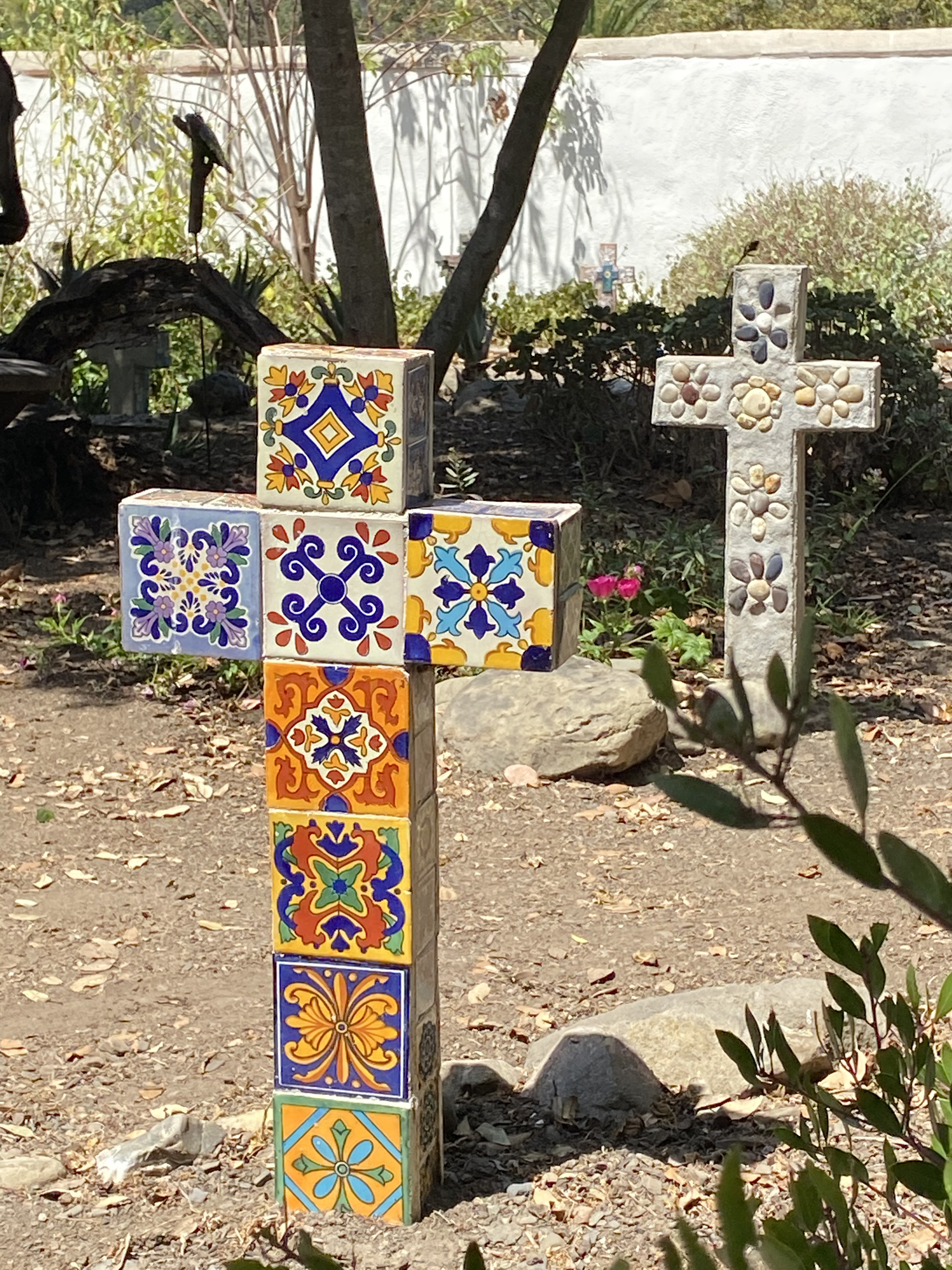
- Grave markers
- Location: 637 San Lorenzo St. Pacific Palisades, Los Angeles, California, U.S.
- Coordinates: 34.0358°N 118.5096°W
- Area: 4,965.8 sq ft (461.34 m^{2})
- Built: 1848–1916
- Architectural style: Adobe wall

Los Angeles Historic-Cultural Monument
- Designated: 2000
- Reference no.: 685

The Pascual Márquez Family Cemetery, located in Pacific Palisades, Los Angeles, California, is the 1840s burial ground of Rancho Boca de Santa Mónica grantee families. “This is not only one of the original pioneer settlements, but one of the last which survives in the midst of modern developments”.

“The cemetery grounds consist of a rectangular lot surrounded by adobe wall built in 1926 at the request of Santa Monica Land and Water when developing the Upper Santa Monica Mesa. Development Manager Dorothy Gillis hired John Byers a notable architect to protect the Cemetery. The cemetery belongs to the Márquez family and the crosses for each burial were designed by local historian and patriarch, Ernest Márquez. The cemetery served the 6,656-acre (26,940,000 m^{2}) Rancho Boca de Santa Monica, a Mexican land grant given to Francisco Márquez and Isidro Reyes in 1839. It is the sole extant private family cemetery in California .

All that remains of the Rancho today are the cemetery and one other parcel retained by Rosemary Márquez (Romero Miano). Today her descendent still receives property tax bills addressed to Rancho Boca de Santa Monica. The Rancho originally extended along the ocean from Topanga Canyon to Montana Avenue and then east to 26th/Allenford and north past Sunset Blvd.. "The Marquez and Reyes families lived…in the Canyon, under the flags of three countries: Spain, Mexico, and the United States, without ever leaving their Rancho homes."

The first burials in the cemetery were infants of rancho grantee Francisco Márquez and his wife Roque Valenzuela; Márquez buried the babies just outside his home in the canyon. The couple had 11 children altogether but only five survived to adulthood. In 1916, the final burial on the land was Pascual Márquez, Francisco’s youngest son.

Burials are now marked with contemporary crosses in various artistic styles made by Pascual Márquez's grandson Ernest Márquez. A photo from the 1890s shows a few wooden crosses placed on graves, “all of them [now] long gone.” Ground-penetrating radar La Senora Research Institute, which has the Cemetery preservation as one of its "missions", arranged for UCLA geo-physicists Cotsen Institute of Archaeology to map the individual burials. From the Santa Barbara Trust for Historic Preservation, La Senora arranged for search dogs trained in "historical human remains detection" to confirm the lost locations of the graves. The finale was when geophysicist Dean Goodman had the fourth graders of Canyon Elementary School drag his GPS equipment around the cemetery exclaiming whenever they 'found' a burial. This project won the 2009 Governor of California's Award for Historic Preservation Education for La Senora and UCLA's Cotsen Institute.

Dorothy Gillis Loomis, daughter of the owner of Santa Monica Land & Water Company, which bought most of the rancho land in the early 20th century, (including the Cemetery site) became the first non-family protector of the cemetery. She convinced her father not to develop the cemetery land, hired the architect, and provided for the construction of the adobe wall. She also donated the statue of San Lorenzo, which carved in Mexico out of a whole tree trunk.

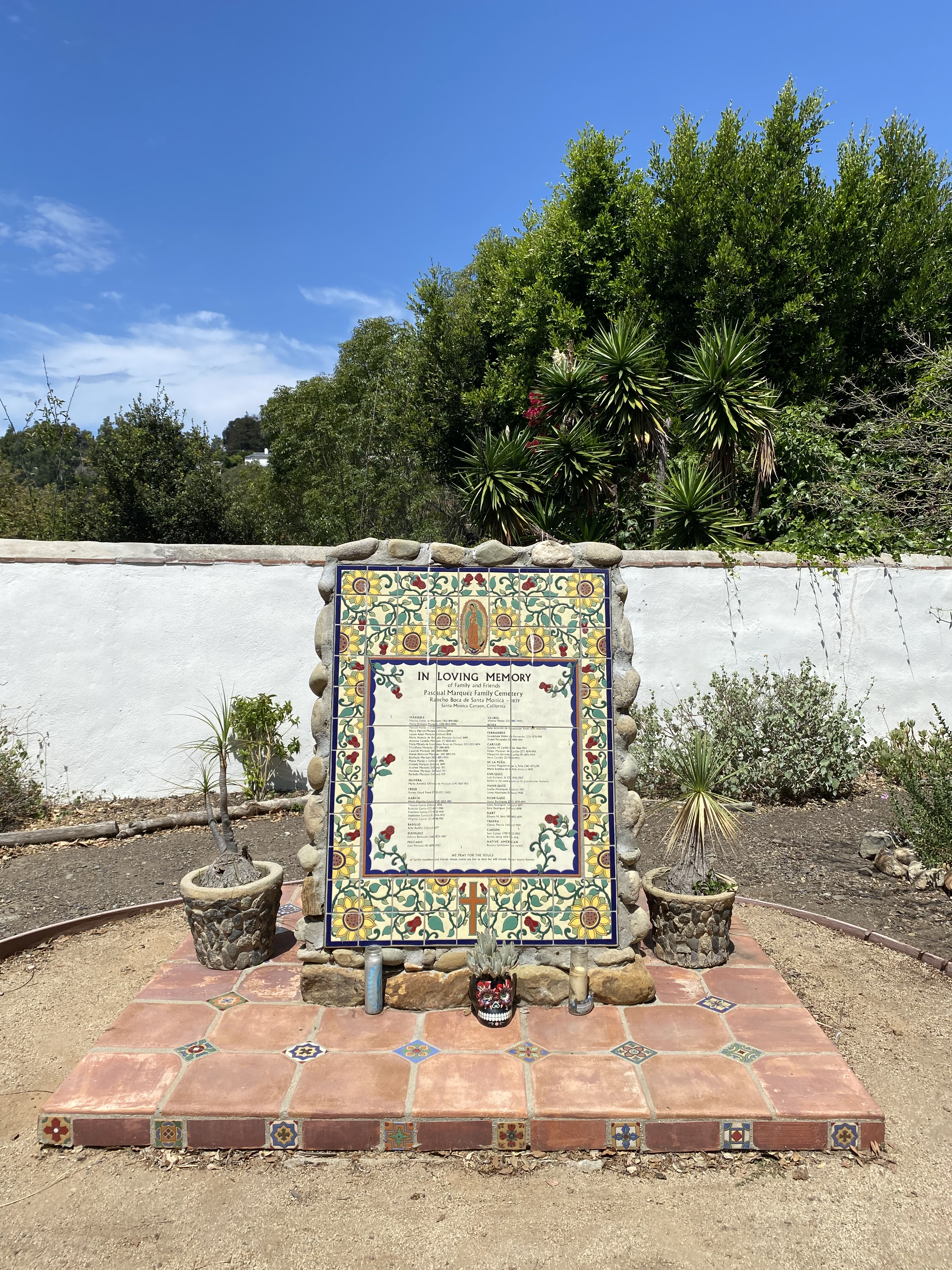
Memorial marker placed as part of the restoration project

The cemetery was photographed by the Works Progress Administration on July 21, 1937. The landscaping of the San Lorenzo shrine at that time was opuntia and cholla. The original wooden crosses are already gone from the burial ground. One grave marker or footstone is visible in the center.

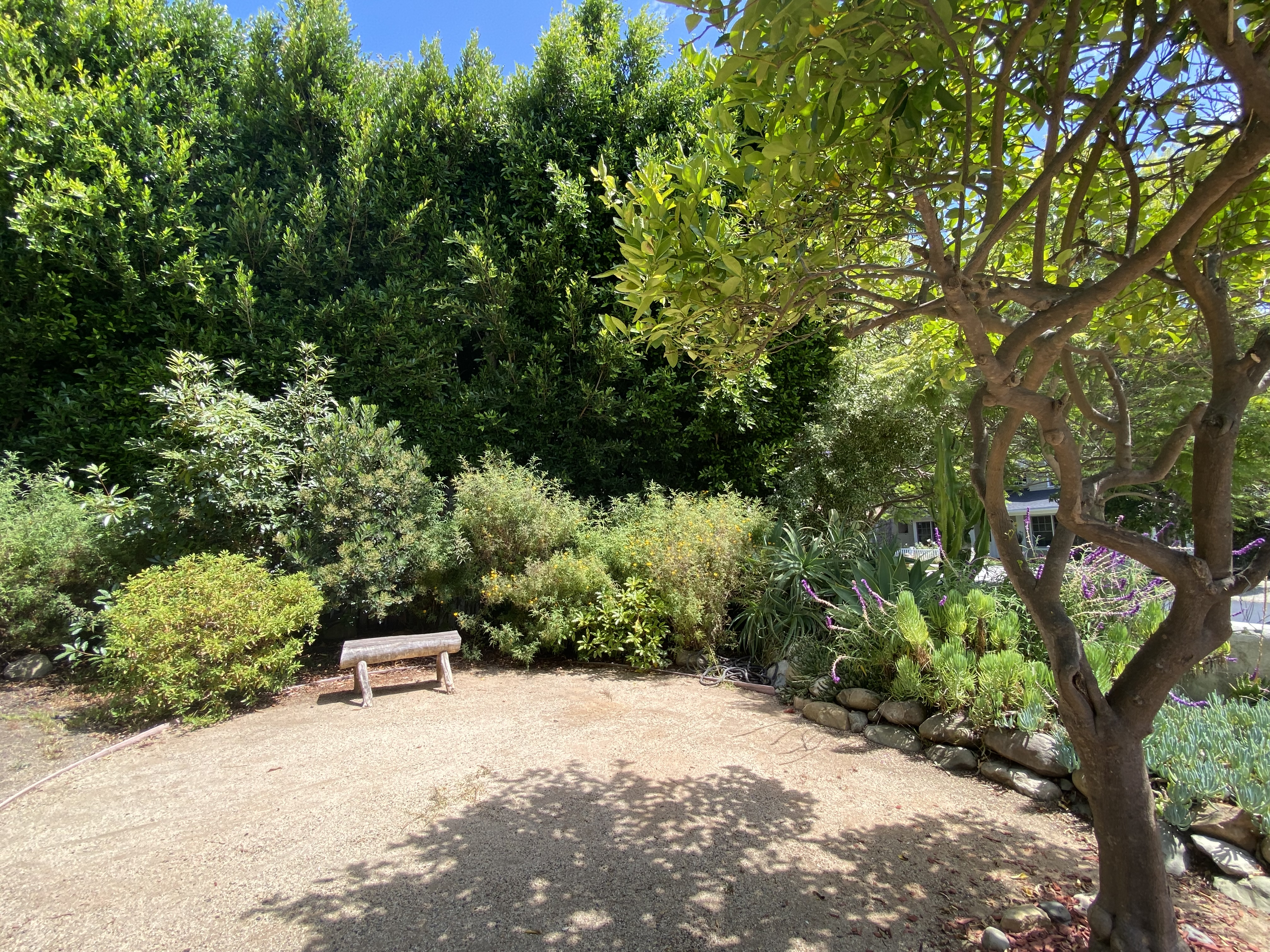
San Lorenzo Garden in front of the burial ground

The entrance to the Cemetery is via La Senora Research Institute's Santuario San Lorenzo. That parcel's access to the otherwise landlocked cemetery was a subject of legal dispute over historic easements. In 2011, the owners who had 'acquired' the entrance property, Fred Marcus and Davida Rochlin, agreed to sell their land (then said to be valued at $127,500) under a 'charitable bargain sale' to La Senora Research Institute for $35,000, after funds were raised by the charity to ensure that the cemetery would always be accessible to descendants and students of history.

The gated Santuario garden and Pascual cemetery are accessible to the public via La Senora Research Institute for school and inner-city youth programs. Guided tours are also available as a part of La Senora's protective Mission.

== See also ==
- List of Los Angeles Historic-Cultural Monuments on the Westside
