= Davida Rochlin =

American architect

- Born: October 1951 (age 74); Los Angeles County, California
- Education: University of California, Berkeley
- Occupation: Architect
- Practice: Davida Rochlin Architecture (DRAIA)
- Buildings: Kenquest Corporate Headquarters, Market Street Residences, Elijah Wood Residence, Sea Level House
- Website: http://www.davidarochlin.com/

Davida Rochlin (born October 1951) is an American architect, active primarily in Los Angeles and Southern California. Her work includes residential and commercial buildings and is notable for its emphasis on green and passive design concepts. She is known for her research on the American porch, which began with her Master's in Architecture thesis at the University of California, Berkeley College of Environmental Design and continued throughout her career. Rochlin is LEED Homes and Living Future Accredited.

== Early years ==
Davida Rochlin was born in October 1951 in Los Angeles to Fred and Harriet Rochlin. Fred was born in Nogales, Arizona, and made his way to California as an architecture student at UC Berkeley. He went on to have a successful career as a Los Angeles-based architect for decades. Not long after retiring, Fred discovered a second career as a performer in the late nineties when he began performing monologues of war stories from his time in World War II. This experience eventually led to the publication of his book Old Man in a Baseball Cap: A Memoir of World War II (ISBN 9780060932275). Harriet was born in Boyle Heights, Los Angeles and also attended UC Berkeley, which is where she met Fred. Harriet was a writer, historian, and lecturer who was regarded as an authority on Jewish heritage in the Western United States. Her research in this area was largely inspired by her experience growing up in Boyle Heights, then a diverse community made up of people of Jewish, Mexican, African, and Asian descent. Boyle Heights was once home to the largest West Coast Jewish community, a fact that Harriet's work, including her book Pioneer Jews: A New Life in the Far West (ISBN 9780618001965), co-written with Fred, focused on. The two were married in July 1947. Together they have four children Davida, Margy, Judy, and Michael.

Rochlin followed in her parents' footsteps by attending University of California, Berkeley, where she earned both a Bachelor of Arts and Masters of Architecture in 1973 and 1976 respectively. It was there that she began her research on the American porch, completing a thesis on the topic under the mentorship of American architect Joseph Esherick. This research marked Rochlin early on in her career as an authority on American domestic vernacular architecture, particularly regarding the porch as both social custom and passive design.

After graduating from UC Berkeley, Rochlin worked at Esherick, Homsey, Dodge, and Davis in San Francisco and Rochlin and Baran (currently RBB Architects) in Los Angeles. Many of the medical projects that Rochlin worked on came from her time as a project planner and architect at Rochlin and Baran. She also spent time in Atlanta, Georgia continuing with her porch research and compiling images, research, and writing on the topic.

== Davida Rochlin Architecture (DRAIA) ==
Rochlin founded her architecture firm in 1986, which worked out of the modernist commercial building, The Barry Building, in Los Angeles, California for thirty years. After a developer bought the landmark building, DRAIA relocated to an office in Santa Monica, California.

Rochlin's architectural work includes residential, commercial, educational, and health care facilities. The overall focus of Rochlin's work, starting with her porch research in the seventies and extending to her latest projects, is sustainability and energy efficiency.

For example, the Net Zero Canyon Orchard residence, a LEED Gold home in Santa Monica, is designed to be completely passive. "Net zero" homes "are so air-tight, well insulated, and energy efficient that they produce as much renewable energy as they consume over the course of a year, resulting in a net zero energy bill, [and a] carbon-free home."

Rochlin's work emphasizes design with low impact, particularly through use of the porch. As Rochlin herself remarked, "depending on where you orient a porch, it can be a profound insulator in winter and source of shade in summer." In architecture, the porch can serve as a mediator between the built environment and the natural landscape. Rochlin's architectural theory regarding the porch has been influential among other contemporary architects and researchers, as well.

Most of Rochlin's residential designs feature a porch, the look of which varies depending on the local landscape. At the Honakai House in Hawaii and Rancho Girasol in Taos, New Mexico, the porch takes the form of a ground level space that blends with the surrounding vast, rugged landscape and single story, low slung nature of the homes. Houses such as the Four Porch House in Los Angeles and Sea Level House in Malibu, California. have many small pocket porches throughout, designed for different needs and uses.

Rochlin's emphasis on mediation and synergy between landscape and abode can be seen in the attention paid to the space around her homes as well. For example, the Four Porch House is notable for an arbor of Santa Rosa plums planted out front. This arbor serves multiple purposes, including channeling the energy between inside and outside space and giving the home a distinctly California character.

While Rochlin's architectural projects range in type, she is most noted for her domestic work. In addition to work on the American porch, Rochlin's theory on vernacular architecture is also cited regarding kitchen design, another aspect residential architecture.

== Exhibitions ==
Much of the research Rochlin conducted during her thesis and tenure in Atlanta culminated in The Front Porch exhibition at the Craft and Folk Art Museum in Los Angeles, California. This exhibit was part of a citywide series of fifteen exhibitions shown at twelve different museums and galleries around Los Angeles. The series, Home Sweet Home, was organized by designer Gere Kavanaugh and architect Charles Moore through the Craft and Folk Art Museum, beginning in 1979. The focus of the series was domestic and vernacular architecture. An essay by each curator involved is highlighted in the exhibit catalog Home Sweet Home: American Domestic Vernacular Architecture (ISBN 9780847805204) edited by Charles W. Moore, Kathryn Smith, and Peter Becker. The exhibits were on view across Los Angeles from October 1983 through January 1984.

In 2010, Rochlin revisited the porch with The New American Porch, a pop-up exhibit at the LA Archive Gallery.

Rochlin also curated an exhibition of her father's watercolors. Fred Rochlin Watercolors showed at the Art + Architecture Pop-Up Gallery in Los Angeles, California in 2009.

Also in 2010, Rochlin was featured at the American Institute of Architects LA 2010 Design Awards Exhibition at the Architecture + Design Museum in Los Angeles, California.

== Personal life ==
Rochlin is married to Fred Marcus and currently resides in Santa Monica, California. Together they have two children, Jake and Joe.

== Selected works ==
=== Residential ===
- 1982, 42 Malibu Colony residence, Malibu, California
- 1992–1994, Rancho Girasol, Taos, New Mexico
- 1998–1999, Four Porch House, Los Angeles, California
- 1999–2000, Elijah Wood residence, Santa Monica, California
- 2001, Innes-Brisbin residence renovation, Santa Monica, California
- 2001–2003, Marcasel residence (additions and renovation), Los Angeles, California
- 2001–2004, Honakai House, Big Island, Hawaii
- 2002–2003, Baker Guest House + Art Studio, Santa Monica, California
- 2002–2004, Milazzo residence (additions and alterations), Thousand Oaks, California
- 2003–2008, Sea Level House, Malibu, California
- 2011, Net Zero Canyond Orchard residence, Santa Monica, California
- 2014–2015, Market Street residences, San Francisco, California

=== Commercial ===
- 1995–1996, Kenquest Corporate Headquarters, Beverly Hills, California
- 2004, Offices for Larry Silverton, Encino, California

=== Educational ===
- 1990, Early Years School (additions and alterations), Santa Monica, California
- 2004, Leo Baeck Temple Religious School renovation and Temple master plan, Bel Air, California

=== Health care ===
- 1993–1994, Fountain Valley Cancer Surgicenter, Fountain Valley, California
- 1994, Cigna Montclair Clinic, Montclair, California
- 1994, Cigna Colton Clinic, Colton, California
- 1997, Kaiser Walnut Center (Records Department remodel), Pasadena, California
- 1997, Biology and Computer Laboratories, School of Engineering, California State University, Los Angeles
