= Landfair Apartments =

Residential complex in Los Angeles, California, United States

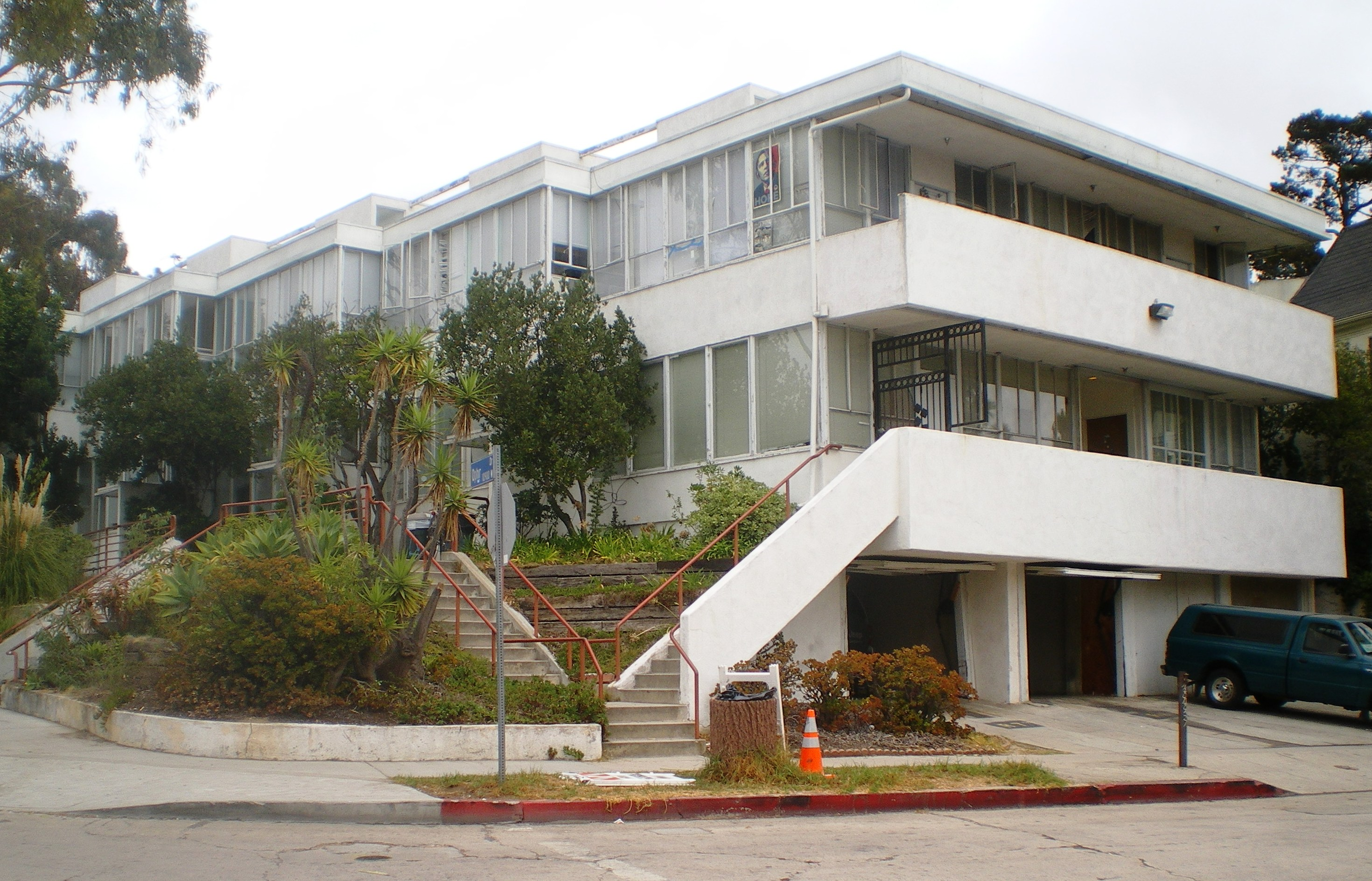
- Landfair Apartments in 2008

- Location within Los Angeles
- 34°04′05″N 118°27′04″W
- Location: SW corner of Landfair Ave. and Ophir Dr. 10940-10954 Ophir Dr., Westwood, Los Angeles, California.

History
- Built: 1937

Site notes
- Architect: Richard Neutra
- Governing body: University Cooperative Housing Association

Los Angeles Historic-Cultural Monument
- Designated: May 20, 1987
- Reference no.: 320

The Landfair Apartments is a historic two-building multi-family complex located on the southwest corner of Landfair Avenue and Ophir Drive in the Westwood neighborhood of Los Angeles, California. They were colloquially known as The Glass House and was renamed Robison Hall after UCHA member Everett Robison was drafted and killed in action in World War II.

The building is a part of a collection of homes designed by Los Angeles based modernist architect, Richard Neutra, and built in North West Westwood Village, which includes the Strathmore Apartments, Elkay Apartments, and Kelton Apartments. Architectural historians Robert Winter and David Gebhard has said that the Landfair Apartments is Neutra's "most International Style designs...of the 1930s."

== History ==
It was designed in 1937 by Neutra in the International style. It originally consisted of five townhouses and two apartments and was purchased in 1941 by the University Cooperative Housing Association. The balconies and exterior glazing were removed when the building was converted to dormitory-style living. It has been altered to meet seismic and accessibility standards. One unit was left unchanged to document Neutra's original townhouse design.

On May 20, 1987, the City of Los Angeles designated the building as a Los Angeles Historic-Cultural Monument.

== See also ==
- List of Los Angeles Historic-Cultural Monuments on the Westside
