= John Thomas Dye School =

School in Los Angeles, California, United States

The John Thomas Dye School
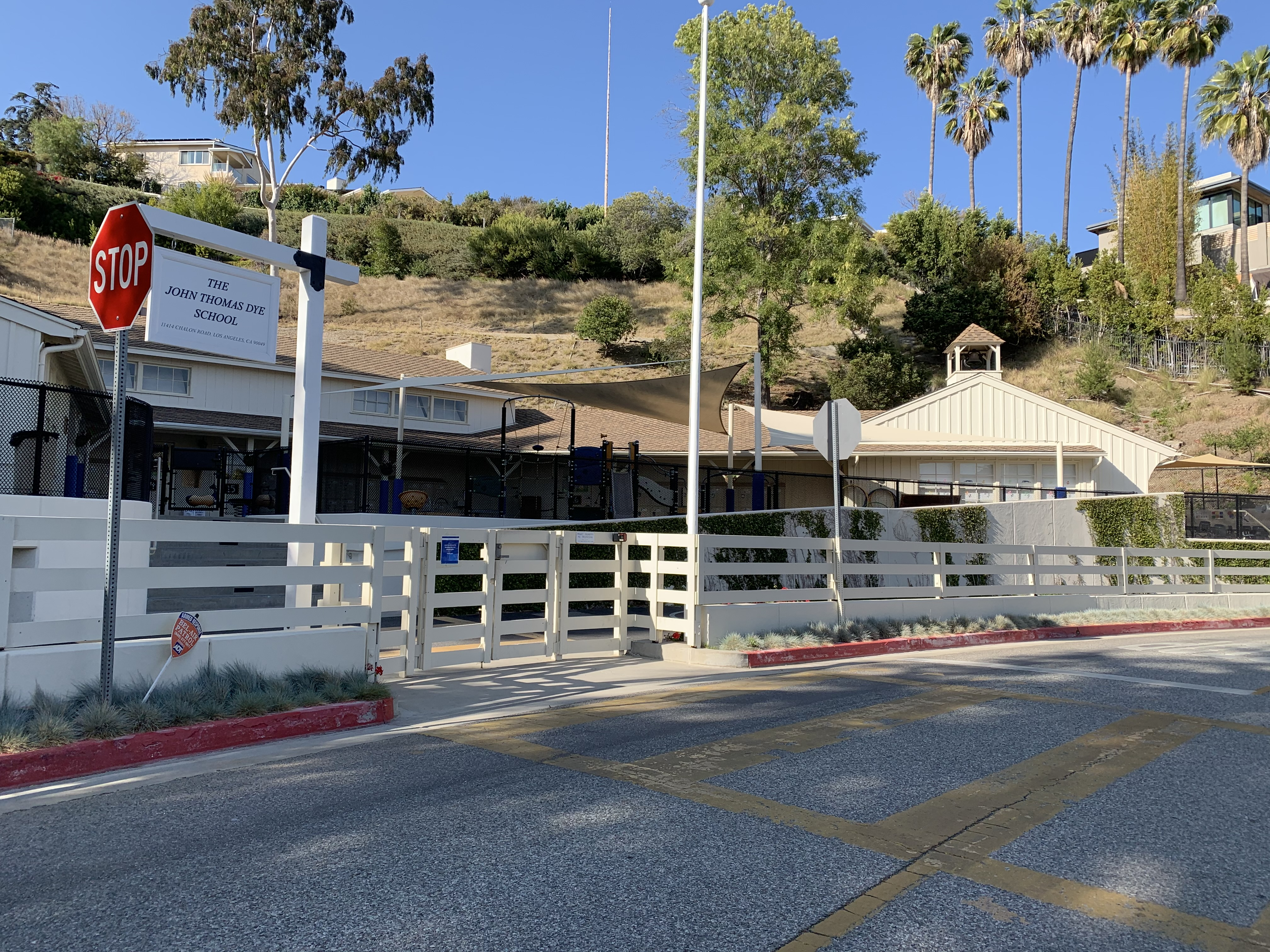

Location
- 11414 Chalon Road, Los Angeles, California; United States; 34.087530°N 118.463360°W

Information
- Type: Private
- Religious affiliation: None
- Founder: Cathryn & John Dye
- Head teacher: Rose E. Helm
- Grades: K-6
- Age range: kindergarten through sixth grade
- Enrollment: 336
- Website: www.jtdschool.org

The John Thomas Dye School, nicknamed JTD, is an independent private coeducational nonsectarian elementary day school located in the Bel-Air area of Los Angeles, California, serving students in kindergarten through sixth grade.

The school was founded in 1929 as the Brentwood Town and Country School by Cathryn Roberts Dye and her husband John Thomas Dye II with its first classes held in the Dyes' living room, and their son John Thomas Dye III its first student. The first permanent facility was built in 1949 and named the Bel Air Town and Country School, on the site still occupied by the school today. The school building was designed by noted Santa Monica architect John Byers. In 1959, the School was renamed The John Thomas Dye School in honor of John Thomas Dye III, who, while serving as a B-17G navigator, was killed on 16 February 1945 by enemy action near Hall in Tirol, Austria in World War II.

== Notable alumni ==
- Paul Thomas Anderson
- Eric Avery
- Jane Fonda
- Peter Hudnut
- Olivia Jade Giannulli
- Bruce Johnston (The Beach Boys)
- Erik Laykin
- Monica Lewinsky
- Michael Madden
- Jonathan Martin
- Kimberly Ovitz
- Wes Parker
- Lisa Marie Presley
- Maureen Reagan
- Ron Reagan
- Melissa Rivers
- Rod Roddenberry
- Tori Spelling
- Brad Wyman
