= Rancho Boca de Santa Mónica =

Pre-statehood California land grant

Coordinates: 34.060°N 118.520°W

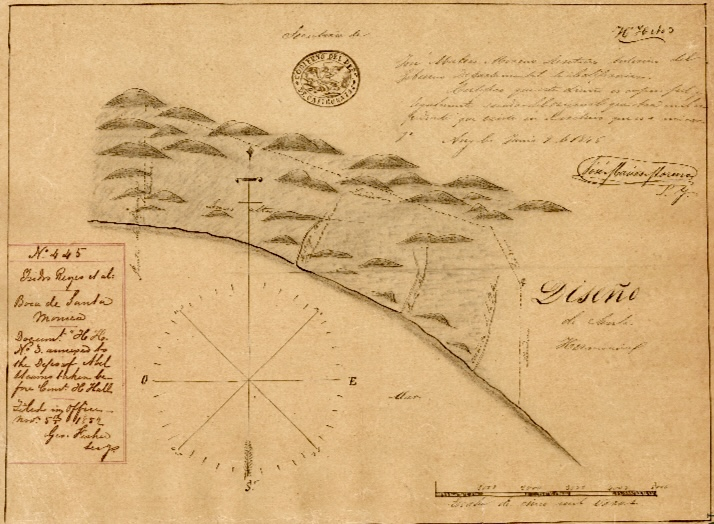
Rancho Boca de Santa Mónica diseño (1852)

Rancho Boca de Santa Mónica was a 6,656-acre (26.94 km^{2}) Mexican land grant in present-day Los Angeles County, California, given by governor Juan Alvarado in 1839 to Ysidro Reyes and Francisco Marquez.

== History ==
In 1839, Ysidro Reyes (1813–1861) and Francisco Marquez (1798–1850) were granted Rancho Boca de Santa Mónica, comprising what is now Santa Monica Canyon, the Pacific Palisades, and parts of Topanga Canyon. The name means "mouth of Saint Monica" — the nearby Tongva Sacred Springs reminded Spanish diarist Juan Crespi of Saint Monica, "the weeping saint: and the adjacent area became known as Santa Mónica.

Francisco Marquez and his wife, Roque Valenzuela, built an adobe house in the upper mesa of the canyon. Marquez built a blacksmith shop and continued to live and work the rancho until his death in 1850.

With the cession of California to the United States following the Mexican–American War, the 1848 Treaty of Guadalupe Hidalgo provided that the land grants would be honored. As required by the Land Act of 1851, a claim for Rancho Boca de Santa Mónica was filed with the Public Land Commission in 1852. The boundary with Rancho San Vicente y Santa Mónica was disputed, and was not finally resolved of until 1882, when the United States courts patented Rancho Boca de Santa Mónica to Marquez and Reyes at 6,656 acres (27 km^{2}).

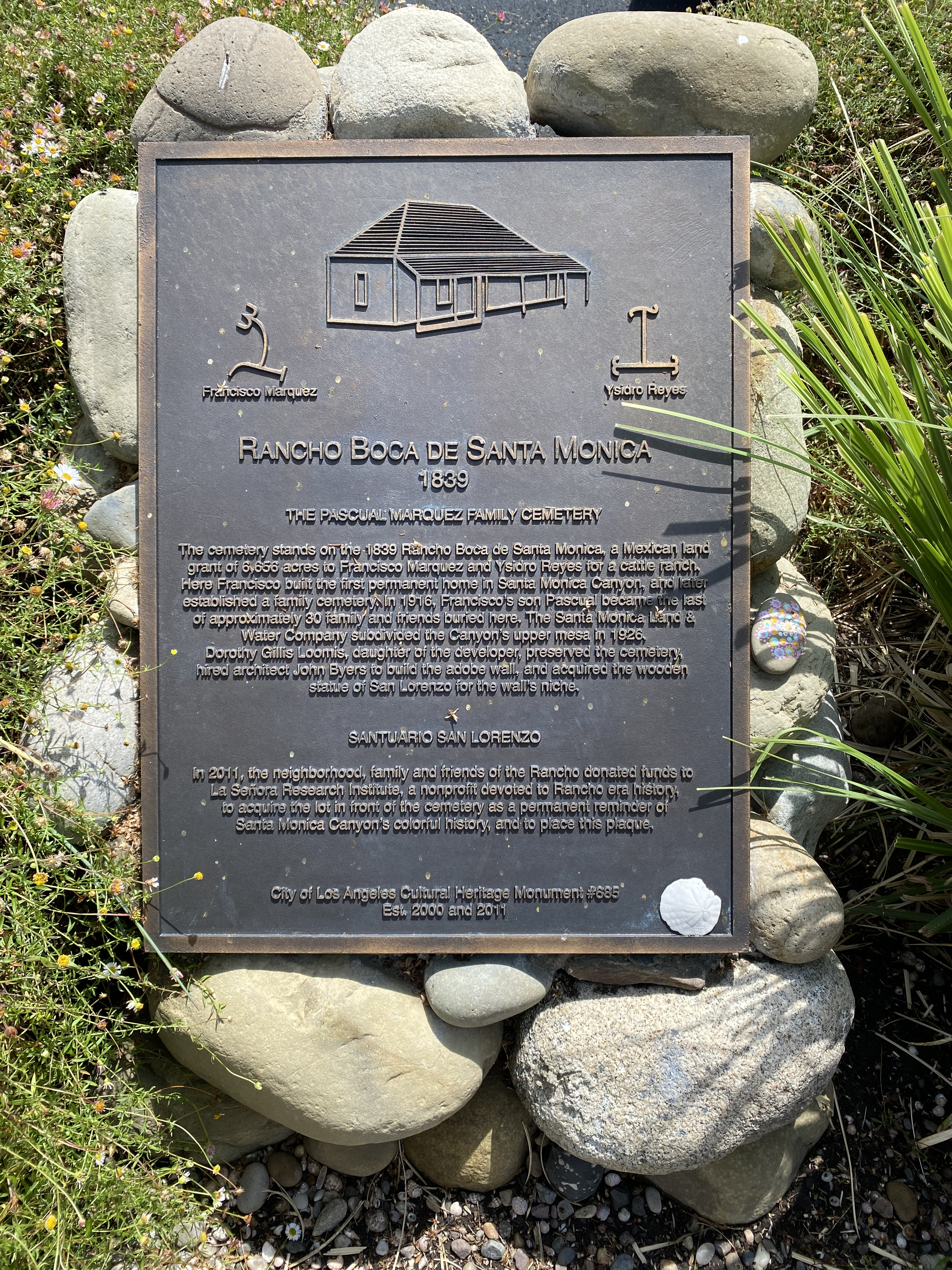
Rancho Boca de Santa Mónica historic marker

Ysidro Reyes and his wife, Maria Antonia Villa, built a house in what is now the Huntington Palisades. Ysidro Reyes died in 1861, leaving his undivided one-half interest in the rancho to his widow Maria Antonia. In 1872, Maria Antonia Reyes sold that interest to Col. Robert S. Baker. In 1874, Baker filed suit to partition the land among himself and the heirs of Francisco Marquez, who jointly held the other one-half interest.

In the mid-1920s, the families sold the land to Santa Monica Land & Water Co., owned by Robert Gillis.

Descendant Ernest Marquez has documented the Rancho Boca de Santa Mónica since the 1950s. Pascual Marquez Family Cemetery is a designated Los Angeles Historic-Cultural Monument.

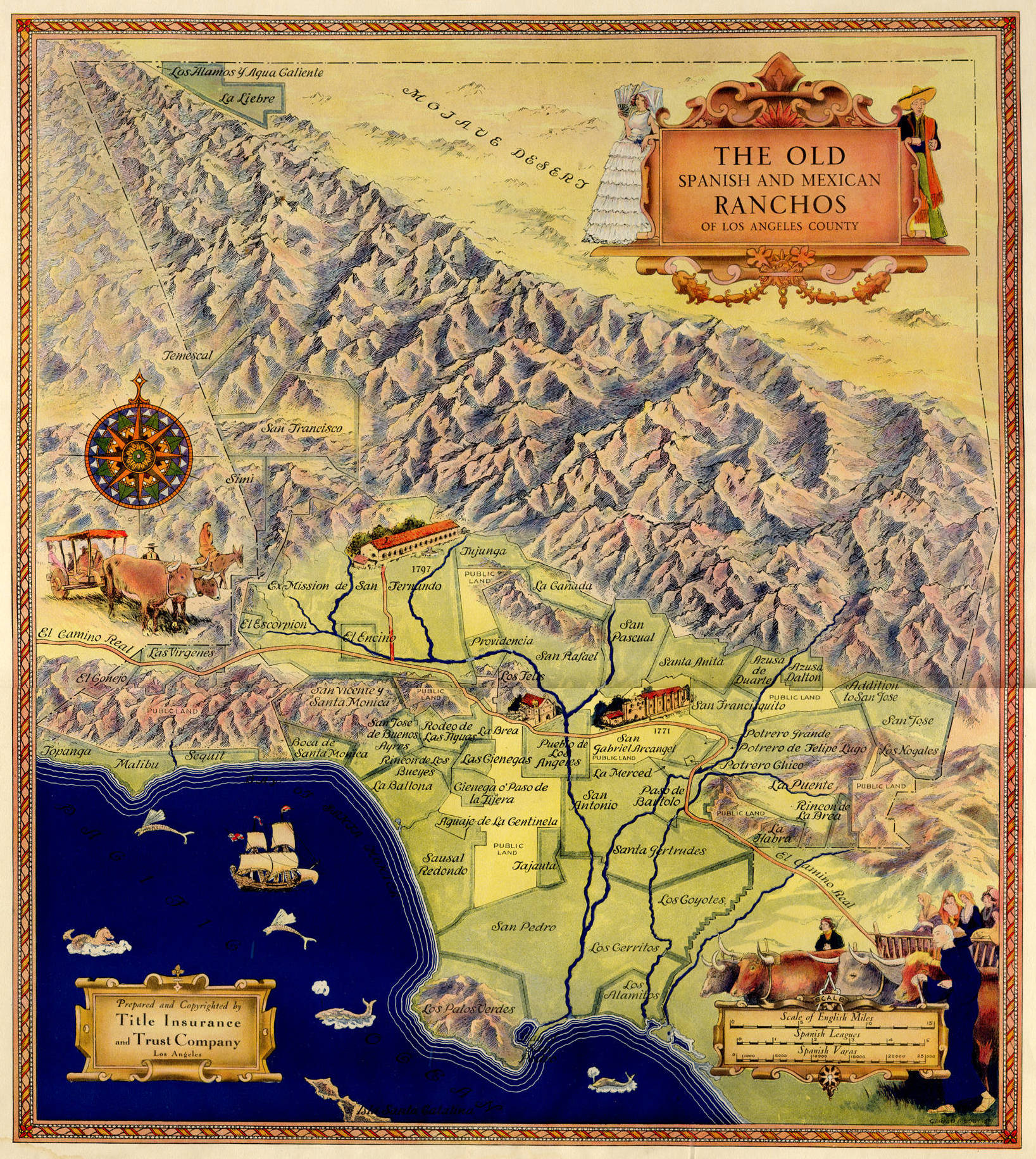
Rancho Boca de Santa Monica and other historic ranchos of Los Angeles County

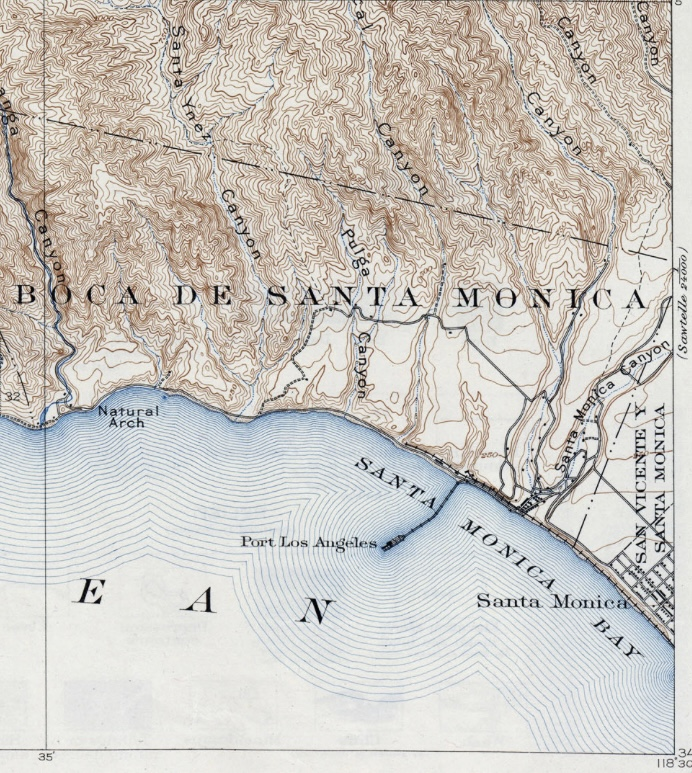
Rancho Boca de Santa Mónica 1901

== Historic sites of the Rancho ==
- Marquez Family Cemetery.
- Hacienda de Jose Mojica (Hacienda La Finca de la Senoras de Guadelupe) the 1929 house of Mexican opera singer José Mojica.
- La Señora Research Institute.

== See also ==
- Pascual Marquez Family Cemetery
- Ranchos of California
- List of Ranchos of California
- List of rancho land grants in Los Angeles County, California
