= Venice of America House =

Historic house in California, United States

- U.S. National Register of Historic Places
- Los Angeles Historic-Cultural Monument
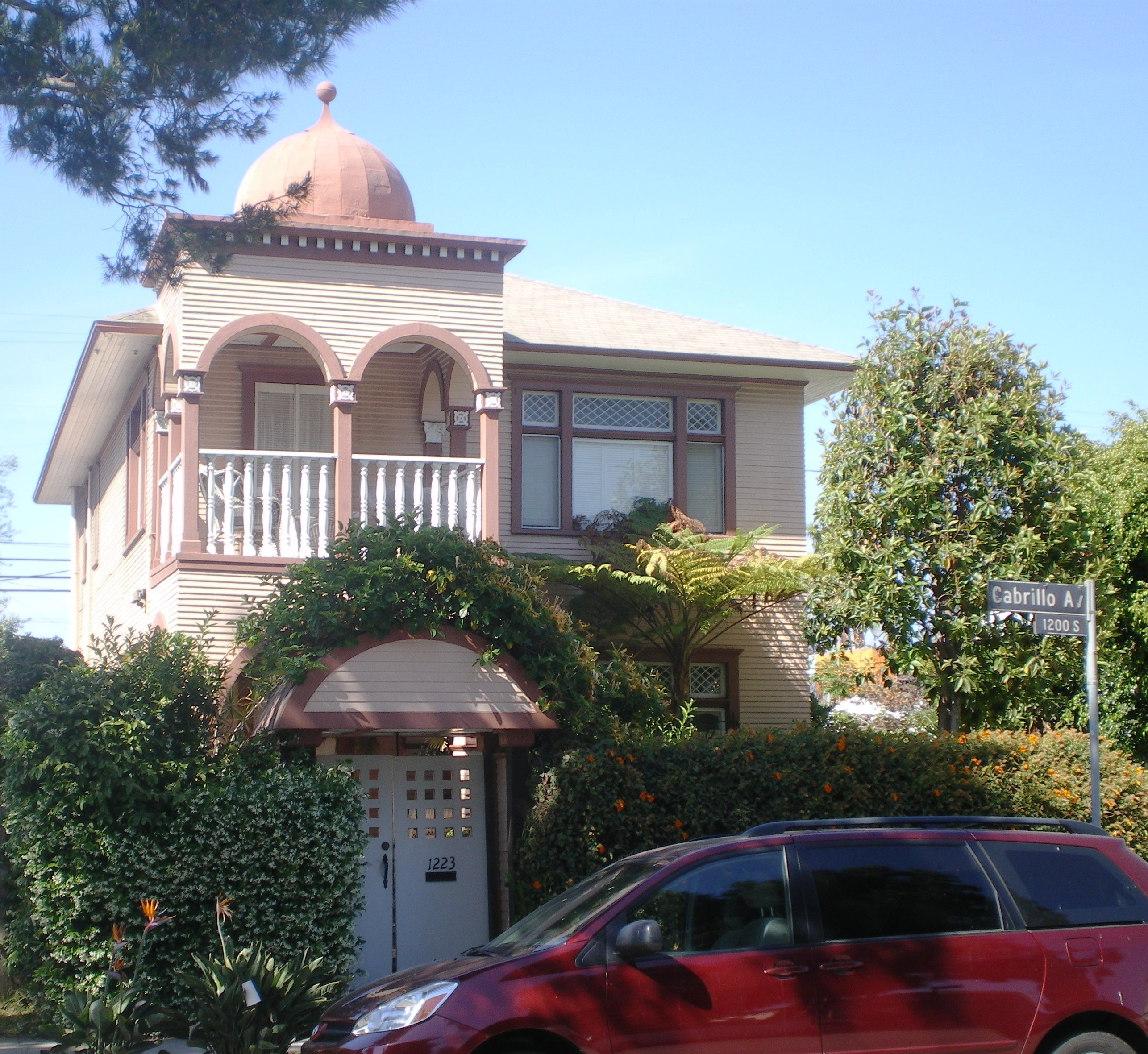
- Venice of America House in 2008

- Location within the Los Angeles metropolitan area Location within California Location within the United States
- Location: 1223 Cabrillo Ave., Venice, Los Angeles, California
- Coordinates: 33°59′26″N 118°28′4″W
- Built: 1906
- Architectural style: Late Victorian
- NRHP reference No.: 00001623
- LAHCM No.: 724

Significant dates
- Added to NRHP: April 9, 2001
- Designated LAHCM: October 1, 2002

Venice of America House is a Late Victorian house built in 1906 in present-day Venice in Los Angeles, California.

The Venice of America House was listed on the National Register of Historic Places in 2001.

== See also ==
- Venice, Los Angeles
- List of Registered Historic Places in Los Angeles
- List of Los Angeles Historic-Cultural Monuments on the Westside
