= University Cooperative Housing Association =

- Abbreviation: UCHA
- Nickname: The Co-op
- Founded: 1936
- Legal status: 501(c)(3)
- Purpose: Student housing cooperative
- Headquarters: 500 Landfair Ave. Los Angeles, CA 90024
- Location: Westwood, Los Angeles, California
- Coordinates: 34.068695°N 118.450715°W
- Services: Affordable housing; Meal plans
- Members: ~420 (academic year)
- Website: uchaonline.com

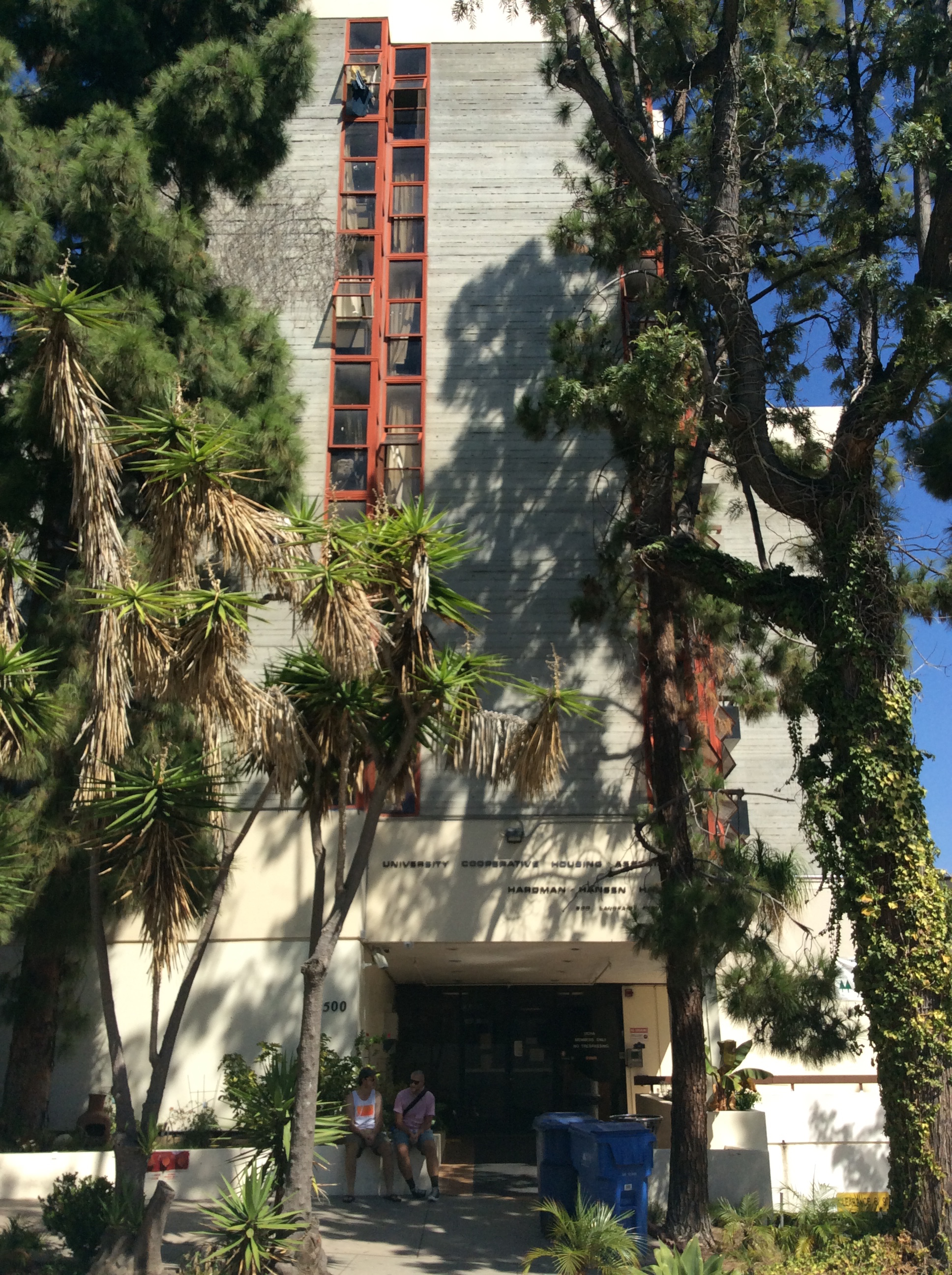
The front of Hardman-Hansen Hall in 2015

The University Cooperative Housing Association (UCHA) is a student housing cooperative in Westwood, Los Angeles near the University of California, Los Angeles (UCLA) campus. Able to house and feed over 400 members, the UCHA primarily offers housing to UCLA students, but welcomes members from any institution. The UCHA operates three buildings: Hardman-Hansen Hall (HHH or "Triple H"), Essene Hall, and Robison Hall. Jim Morrison of The Doors purportedly lived at the UCHA during his time at UCLA. Alongside the UCLA campus, Hardman-Hansen and Robison Halls were used as filming locations for the 1982 horror film, The Dorm That Dripped Blood. Many students of China's Lost Generation studying at UCLA resided at the UCHA.

== History ==
The UCHA was originally founded as Adams House in a Santa Monica rental by eight students in 1936, and was incorporated in 1938 as the University Cooperative Housing Association. In 1941, the UCHA purchased for $45,000 the Landfair Apartments (also known as the Glass House), which was designed by Richard Neutra and was designated in 1987 as a historic-cultural monument in Los Angeles. The Landfair Apartments was renamed Robison Hall after UCHA member Everett Robison, who was drafted and killed in action in World War II.

Around the time of the UCHA's inception, black students were barred from living in Westwood, but, by exploiting a legal loophole, George Brown, Jr., a founding member of the Co-op, was able to welcome Luther Goodwin into the UCHA as his roommate and as Westwood's first black resident. In addition to being one of the first desegregated student housing communities in the nation, the UCHA would later offer refuge for Japanese-American students that faced discrimination during World War II. The UCHA purchased the Landfair House in 1947, which would be replaced by Hardman-Hansen Hall, and in 1958 an apartment building next-door that would become Essene Hall, named after UCHA founder John Essene.

== Notable alumni ==
- George Edward Brown Jr. (1920-1999) – Co-founded UCHA in 1938. Southern California politician from 1963 to 1999.
- Rafer Johnson – American decathlete and film actor. He was the 1960 Olympic Decathlon gold medalist, Team USA's Flag Bearer. Acting appearances included the James Bond film "Licence to Kill" (1989).
