= Elkay Apartments =

Building in California, United States

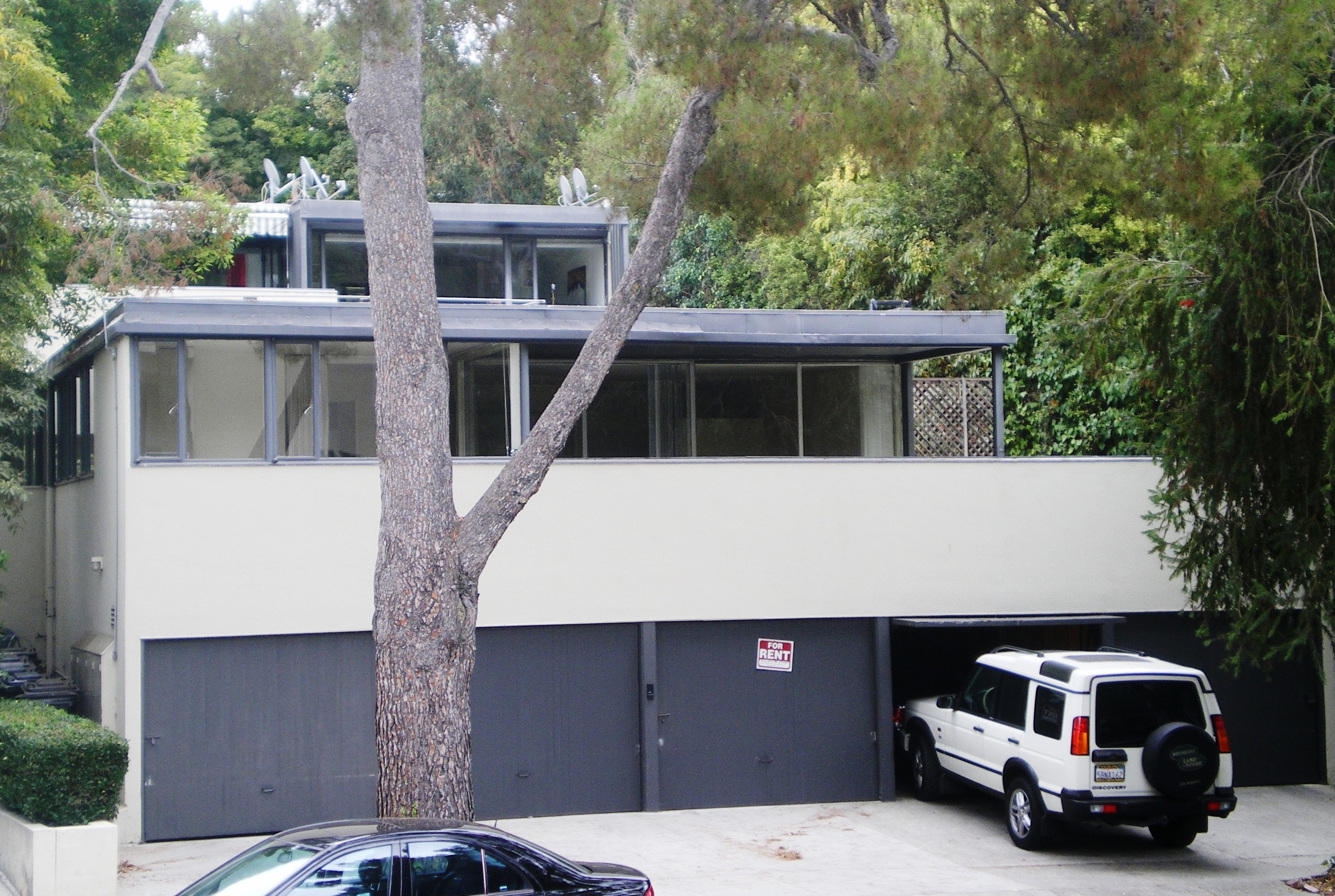
- Elkay Apartments

- Location within Los Angeles
- 34°03′55″N 118°27′10″W
- Location: 638-642 Kelton Avenue, Westwood, Los Angeles, California

History
- Built: 1948

Site notes
- Architect: Richard Neutra
- Governing body: private

Los Angeles Historic-Cultural Monument
- Designated: June 21, 1988
- Reference no.: 368

The Elkay Apartments is a historic five-unit two-story multi-family building located at 638-642 Kelton Avenue, in the Westwood neighborhood of Los Angeles, California.

== History ==
Designed in 1948 in the International Style of architecture by Los Angeles architect Richard Neutra, it was completed in 1948 for violist Louis Kievman. The name Elkay is derived from his initials.

The building is a part of a collection of homes designed by Neutra and built in North West Westwood Village, including the Landfair Apartments and Strathmore Apartments. It is next door to the Kelton Apartments, which Neutra designed in 1941 for himself. The Elkay Apartments is the last home designed by Neutra in North Westwood Village. On June 21, 1988, despite objections from the owners of the Apartments at the time, the City of Los Angeles designated the building as a Los Angeles Historic-Cultural Monument.
