= Strathmore Apartments =

Building in Los Angeles, California

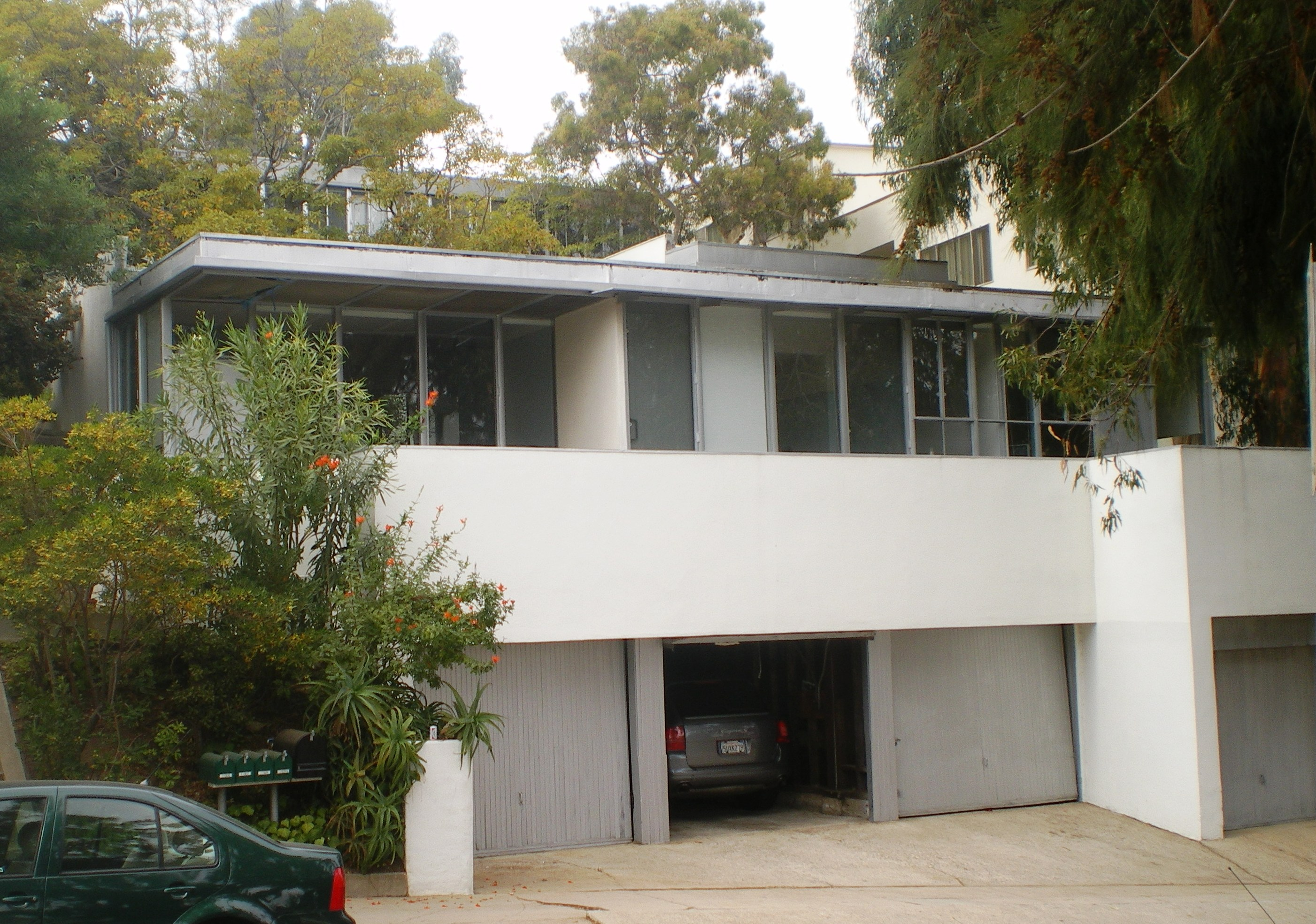
- Strathmore Apartments

- Location within Los Angeles Strathmore Apartments (California) Strathmore Apartments (the United States)
- 34°03′55″N 118°27′03″W
- Location: 11005-11013 1/2 Strathmore Dr. Westwood, Los Angeles, California

History
- Built: 1937

Site notes
- Architect: Richard Neutra
- Governing body: private

Los Angeles Historic-Cultural Monument
- Designated: April 8, 1988
- Reference no.: 351

U.S. National Register of Historic Places
- Designated: September 25, 2013
- Reference no.: 13000754

The Strathmore Apartments is a historic 8-unit multi-family complex located at 11005-11013 1/2 Strathmore Drive in the Westwood neighborhood of Los Angeles, California. Notable past residents, amongst others, include John Entenza, Charles Eames, Ray Eames, Luise Rainer, Clifford Odets, and Orson Welles.

The building is a part of a collection of homes designed by Los Angeles-based modernist architect, Richard Neutra, and built in North West Westwood Village, which includes the Landfair Apartments, Elkay Apartments, and Kelton Apartments.

== History ==
The Strathmore Apartments were designed in 1937 in the international style of architecture by Los Angeles architect Richard Neutra. He was commissioned by the landowner to design a 4-unit building and added another four units next to the building for himself when he realized the lot was available. The complex includes a modern bungalow court. The early occupants, including Neutra's extended family members and actress Luise Rainer, has called the architectural style "cold" and "industrial."

UCLA Oceanographic and Atmospheric scientists and a mathematician later converted four of the eight units into condos, believed to be the first and only condo conversions done unto a Neutra building.

On April 8, 1988, the City of Los Angeles designated the complex a Los Angeles Historic-Cultural Monument.
