= Kelton Apartments =

Building in Los Angeles, California

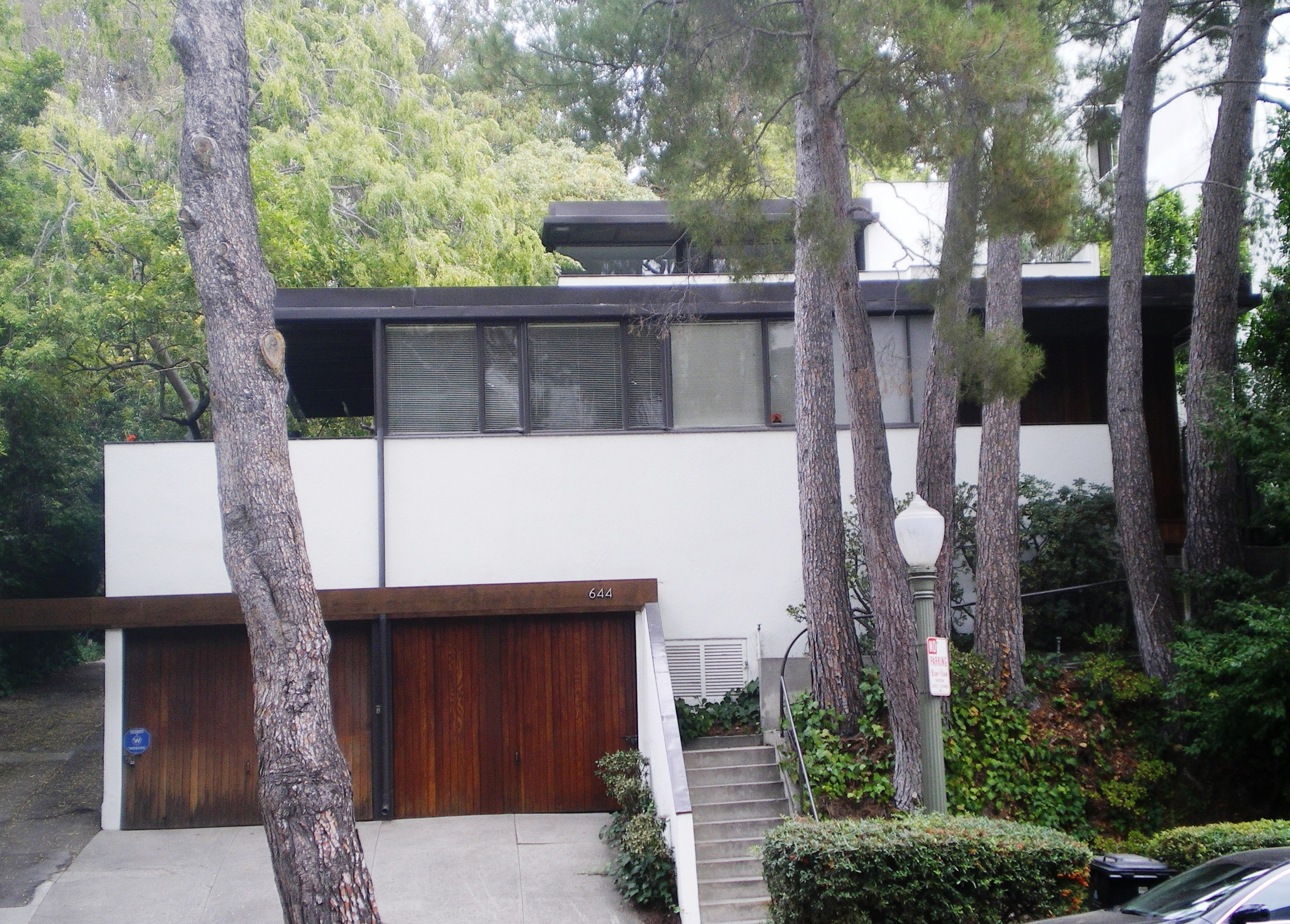
- Kelton Apartments

- Location within Los Angeles
- 34°03′55″N 118°27′09″W
- Location: 646-648 Kelton Ave. Westwood, Los Angeles, California

History
- Built: 1941

Site notes
- Architect: Richard Neutra
- Governing body: private

U.S. National Register of Historic Places
- Designated: January 3, 2020
- Reference no.: 100004856

Los Angeles Historic-Cultural Monument
- Designated: June 21, 1988
- Reference no.: 365

The Kelton Apartments is a historic four-unit two-story multi-family building located at 644-648 Kelton Avenue, in the Westwood neighborhood of Los Angeles, California.

The building is a part of a collection of homes designed by Los Angeles based modernist architect, Richard Neutra, and built in North West Westwood Village, including the Strathmore Apartments, Elkay Apartments, and Landfair Apartments.

== History ==
The building was built in 1941 in the international style for Neutra's in-laws after they moved out of the nearby Strathmore Apartments. It is next door to the Elkay Apartments, which Neutra designed in 1948. The building is noted to be an indicator of Neutra's shifting post-war style towards a more "relaxed and lyrical" design. The building was featured on the cover of L'Architecture d'aujourd'hui in 1946.

On June 21, 1988, the City of Los Angeles designated the building as a Los Angeles Historic-Cultural Monument. The complex was listed on the National Register of Historic Places in 2020.
