= George R. Kress House =

Historic house in California, United States

- U.S. National Register of Historic Places
- Los Angeles Historic-Cultural Monument
- Location within the Los Angeles metropolitan area Location within California Location within the United States
- Location: Los Angeles, California
- Coordinates: 34°6′48″N 118°26′5″W
- Built: 1931
- Architect: Muck, Harry J.
- Architectural style: Tudor Revival
- NRHP reference No.: 98001196
- LAHCM No.: 655

Significant dates
- Added to NRHP: September 25, 1998
- Designated LAHCM: September 18, 1998

The George R. Kress House is a Tudor Revival-style home in a canyons area of Los Angeles, California that was built in 1931. It was listed on the National Register of Historic Places in 1998.

Located in Benedict Canyon in a private gated community, it is a 98 feet (30 m) by 27 feet (8.2 m) house ranging from one-story tall on its south end to three stories on the north. It faces east. It has a terra cotta tile roof.

It is significant both for its association with a builder and practical engineer who moved buildings, George R. Kress, and for its architecture.

Kress moved hundreds of houses in Pittsburgh and in Los Angeles. In Los Angeles the buildings he moved included mansions and some 13-story buildings.
