= Barry Building =

Landmark historic building in California, United States

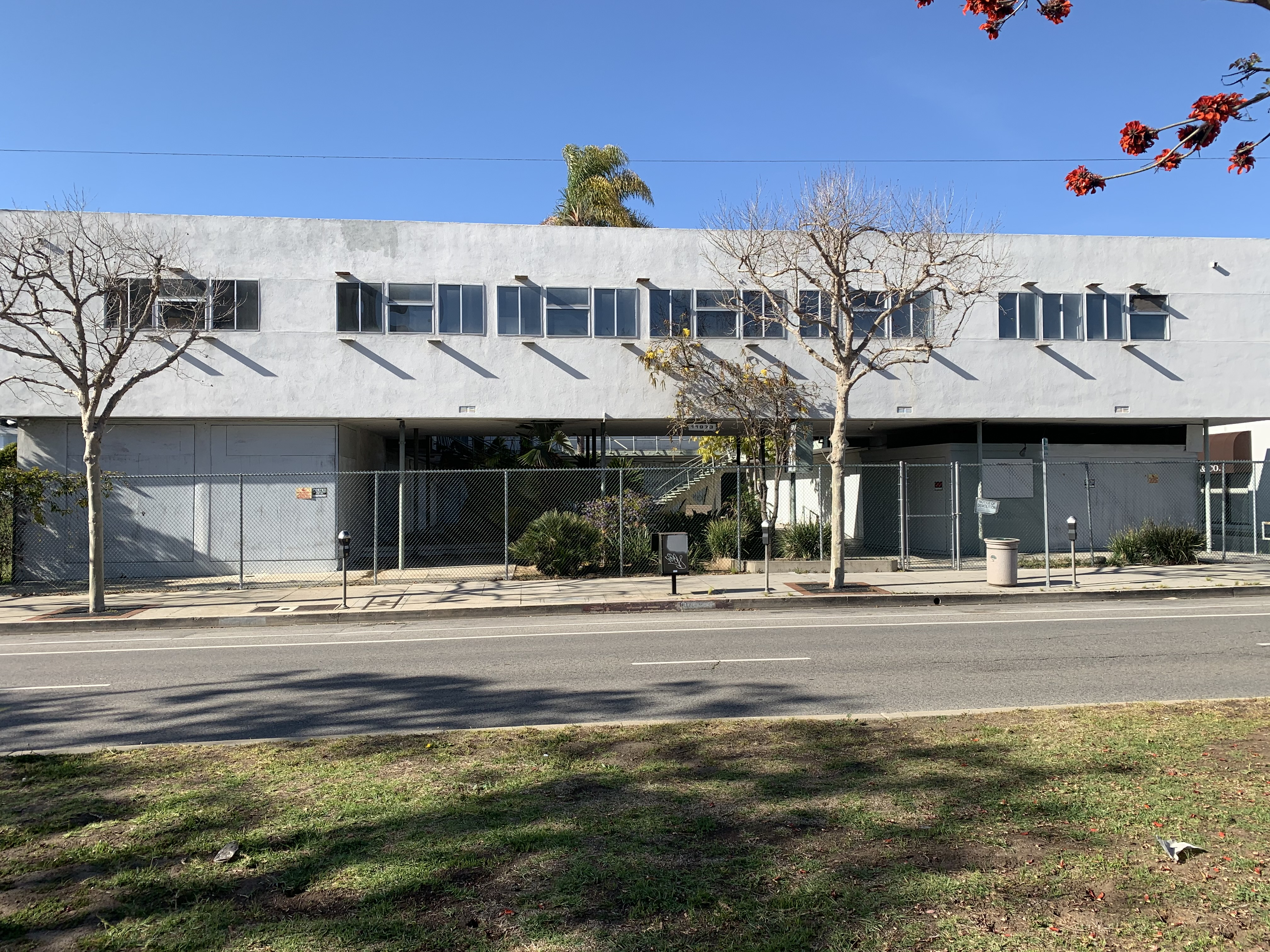
- Exterior of the building as of March 2021
- Interactive map of the Barry Building area

General information
- Location: 11973 San Vicente Boulevard, Los Angeles, United States
- Coordinates: 34°03′10″N 118°28′18″W
- Current tenants: None

Los Angeles Historic-Cultural Monument
- Designated: October 2, 2007
- Reference no.: 887

The Barry Building is a landmark commercial mid-twentieth century modern building located at 11973 San Vicente Boulevard in the heart of the Brentwood neighborhood of Los Angeles, California, United States. It was designed by architect Milton Caughey (1911–1958) and completed in 1951. In 2007, the building was listed as a Los Angeles Historic-Cultural Monument,(Historical Cultural Monument #887), making it one of the few mid-century modern commercial buildings to gain such status. It was identified by the Los Angeles Cultural Heritage Commission as being a well-preserved and notable example of the California-style modern design. Despite this designation, the building's current owners received permission to demolish the building in 2019. As of March 2021, the building has not yet been demolished, however it is currently boarded up and vacant.

The building's best-known feature is an unusual open courtyard which once housed Dutton's bookstore. The building may soon be demolished as a part of the proposed Green Hollow Square development.

== History ==
The Barry Building was commissioned by its owner David Barry and completed in 1951 as postwar development was beginning to redefine Brentwood's San Vicente Boulevard's commercial corridor. It is one of Milton Caughey's few commercial buildings.

The building's most famous tenant was the Dutton's Bookstore where for more than two decades authors such as Kurt Vonnegut and Isabel Allende held readings and signings. Dutton's Bookstore closed in 2008. It is now home to the Caffe Luxxe.

In 2006, ownership of the building turned over to investor Charlie Munger, Vice-chairman of Berkshire Hathaway Corporation, the diversified investment corporation chaired by Warren Buffett.

== Design ==
Architect Milton Caughey graduated from the Yale School of Architecture in 1938 and moved to Los Angeles where, after serving in the navy, he joined architect Gordon Kaufmann. Caughey later opened his own practice designing private residences as well as institutions and school buildings. Caughey was the winner of four Merit Awards by the Southern California Chapter of the American Institute of Architects.

Caughey was an early adopter of the use of indoor and outdoor space that is now associated with mid-20th century modern architecture in Southern California. The building features a set of outdoor cantilevered stairs which curve down to a central, two-story courtyard. The flat roof and simple style are emblematic of Caughey's work, which was influenced by Corbusier and the International Style.

== Architecture ==
The Barry Building's use of simple lines and outdoor space exemplifies mid-20th century modern architecture in Southern California; its open plan shows the influence of Corbusier and the International Style. The building features two cantilevered sets of stairs which sweep down to a central, open two-story courtyard. The interplay of indoor and outdoor space is emblematic of Caughey's work. According to the recommendation report by the Los Angeles Department of City Planning, "The Barry Building embodies the aesthetics and stylistic features typical of the experimentation with new ideas that gave such vitality to the architecture of the period...[it] is one of the rare commercial buildings left in West Los Angeles that exemplifies the period of great inspiration and ingenuity in California architecture."

== Preservation ==
In 2007, the owners started plans to develop the site along with the surrounding property and moved to evict Dutton's Bookstore. At the same time, preservationists requested a review of the building by the Cultural Heritage Commission for potential landmark status, a designation that does not require consent of an owner. In 2007, with the support of Councilman Bill Rosendahl, the Barry Building was declared Historic-Cultural Monument # 887 by the Cultural Heritage Commission. Nonetheless, landmark status does not protect a building from demolition. Under the California Environmental Quality Act, however, the preparation of an environmental impact report (EIR) is required before the granting of a demolition permit for a historic landmark.

In 2007, Charles Munger submitted a draft EIR to develop the site, which included numerous surrounding properties. Called Green Hollow Square, the project was initially a 49,300 square-foot commercial center but was redrafted in 2011 and is now a proposed 73,000 square foot commercial space in three new, two-story buildings. The final EIR was released in January 2012 in which the developers preference is an option with a retail and restaurant complex that would require the demolition of the Barry Building. In addition, the FEIR includes a preservation alternative which would incorporate the Barry Building.

In 2019, the owners requested and were granted a permit to demolish the building, with the intention to sell the land by itself. The building is currently empty but, as of March 2021, has not been demolished.

== See also ==
- List of Los Angeles Historic-Cultural Monuments on the Westside
