= John Byers (architect) =

American architect

John Winford Byers
- Born: 22 March 1875; Grand Rapids, Michigan
- Died: 22 May 1966 (aged 91); Santa Monica, California
- Occupation: Architect
- Buildings: 1505 San Remo Drive, Pacific Palisades. Built in 1927. Commissioned by actor Lionel Atwell

John Winford Byers (22 March 1875 – 22 May 1966) was a Santa Monica architect and builder noted for use of the Spanish Colonial revival style.

== Early life ==
Byers was born in Grand Rapids, Michigan. Byers, a graduate from Harvard University, was employed as a schoolteacher, teaching Spanish and French, at San Rafael High School and Santa Monica High School. Self-trained as a builder and architect, Byers completed his first commission, a house at 510 Lincoln Boulevard for W.F. Barnum, the principal of the Santa Monica High School in 1916.

== Importance ==
Byers designed and built dozens of homes in Brentwood, Pacific Palisades, and Santa Monica from 1916 through 1946. He was fascinated with the native California architecture and its Mexican and Spanish roots. He was most notable for his "Adobe" designed buildings, having written several articles in the 1920s and 1930s on adobe construction and its influence in California architect. He studied the native building traditions of Hispanic cultures and went through a phase where he built houses of adobe and stucco. He established his own workshop, employing Mexican craftsmen who were masters at creating and installing the adobe brick, the decorative tile, wrought iron and woodwork that he used in his houses.

== Selected projects ==
Project	Date	Address	Location
Stevenson Residence Albert Ahern Residence	1926 1926	2126 La Mesa Drive 1707 San Vicente	Santa Monica Santa Monica
Donald Armstrong Residence		1717 San Vicente	Santa Monica
J.B. Nethercott Residence		500 25th Street	Santa Monica
Speers Residence		270 18th Street	Santa Monica
Byers Residence	1917	2034 La Mesa Drive	Santa Monica
Byers Residence	1917	547 7th Street	Santa Monica
Fuller Residence	1920	304 18th Street	Santa Monica
MacBennel House	1921	404 Georgina Avenue	Santa Monica
Bradbury House (NRHP listed)	1923	102 Ocean Way	Pacific Palisades
Gorham-Holiday Residence	1923	326 Adelaide Drive	Santa Monica
Zimmer Residence	1924	2101 La Mesa Drive	Santa Monica
Laidlaw Residence	1924	217 17th Street	Santa Monica
Thompson House	1924	2021 La Mesa Drive	Santa Monica
Tinglof Residence	1925	2010 La Mesa Drive	Santa Monica
Bundy Residence	1925	2133 La Mesa Drive	Santa Monica
E.J. Carrillo Residence	1925	1602 Georgina	Santa Monica
Residence	1925	1650 Amalfi Drive	Pacific Palisades
Byers Office	1926	246 26th Street	Santa Monica
Barclay Residence	1927	1425 Monaco Drive	Pacific Palisades
Miles Memorial Playhouse	1929	1130 Lincoln Boulevard	Santa Monica
John Byers (Third) Residence	1929	2034 La Mesa Drive	Santa Monica
Residence	1929	1744 Reedvale Lane	Brentwood
Kerr Residence	1930	428 N Carmelina Avenue	Brentwood
Hamilton Residence	1931	193 N Carmelina Avenue	Brentwood
Joel McCrea Ranch	1933	4500 N. Moorpark Rd.	Thousand Oaks
Murray Residence	1935	436 N Carmelina Avenue	Brentwood
Stedman Residence	1935	363 N Carmelina Avenue	Brentwood
Temple Residence	1935	231 N Rockingham Avenue	Brentwood
Kenaston Residence	1936	914 Corsica Drive	Pacific Palisades
Taylor Residence	1937	2650 Lake View Ave	Los Angeles
Residence	1939	2401 Mandeville Canyon Rd	Brentwood

Other dwellings were constructed in Coachella, Victorville, Bel Air, and Beverly Hills. Byers also constructed an adobe memorial recreation hall (Miles Playhouse) in Santa Monica, a clubhouse at Brentwood Park, and a building at the John Thomas Dye School.

He was also responsible for the adobe wall surrounding the landmarked Pascual Marquez Family Cemetery in Santa Monica Canyon.

== Family life ==
When John Byers died in Santa Monica, at the age of 91 in 1966, he was based out of this Spanish Colonial Revival compound at 246 26th Street. Byers and his family lived in the house at 2034 La Mesa Drive for almost thirty years.
