= Moreton Bay Fig Tree (Santa Barbara, California) =

Large tree in the United States

Coordinates: 34.4138°N 119.6942°W

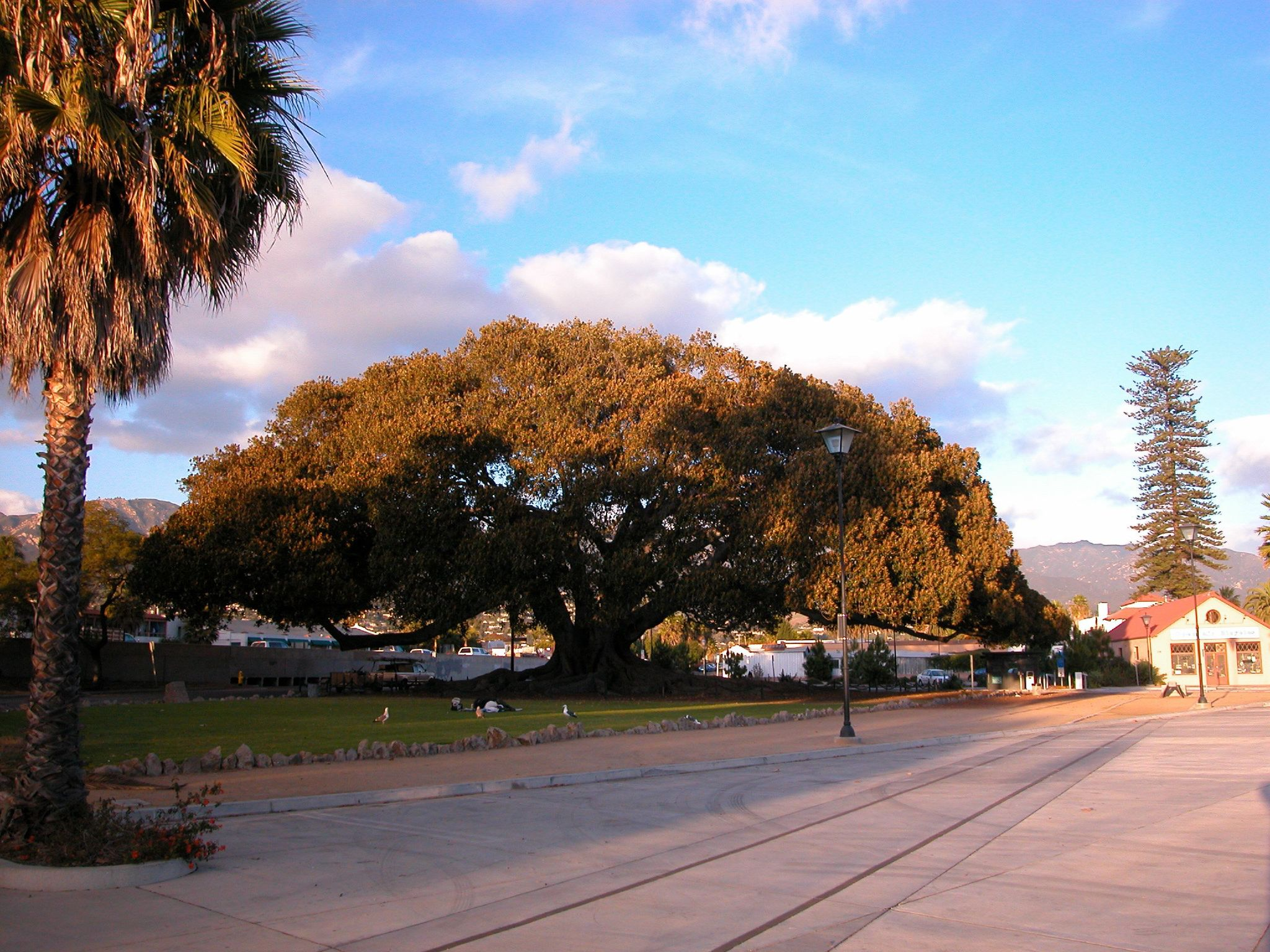
The Moreton Bay Fig Tree in Santa Barbara.

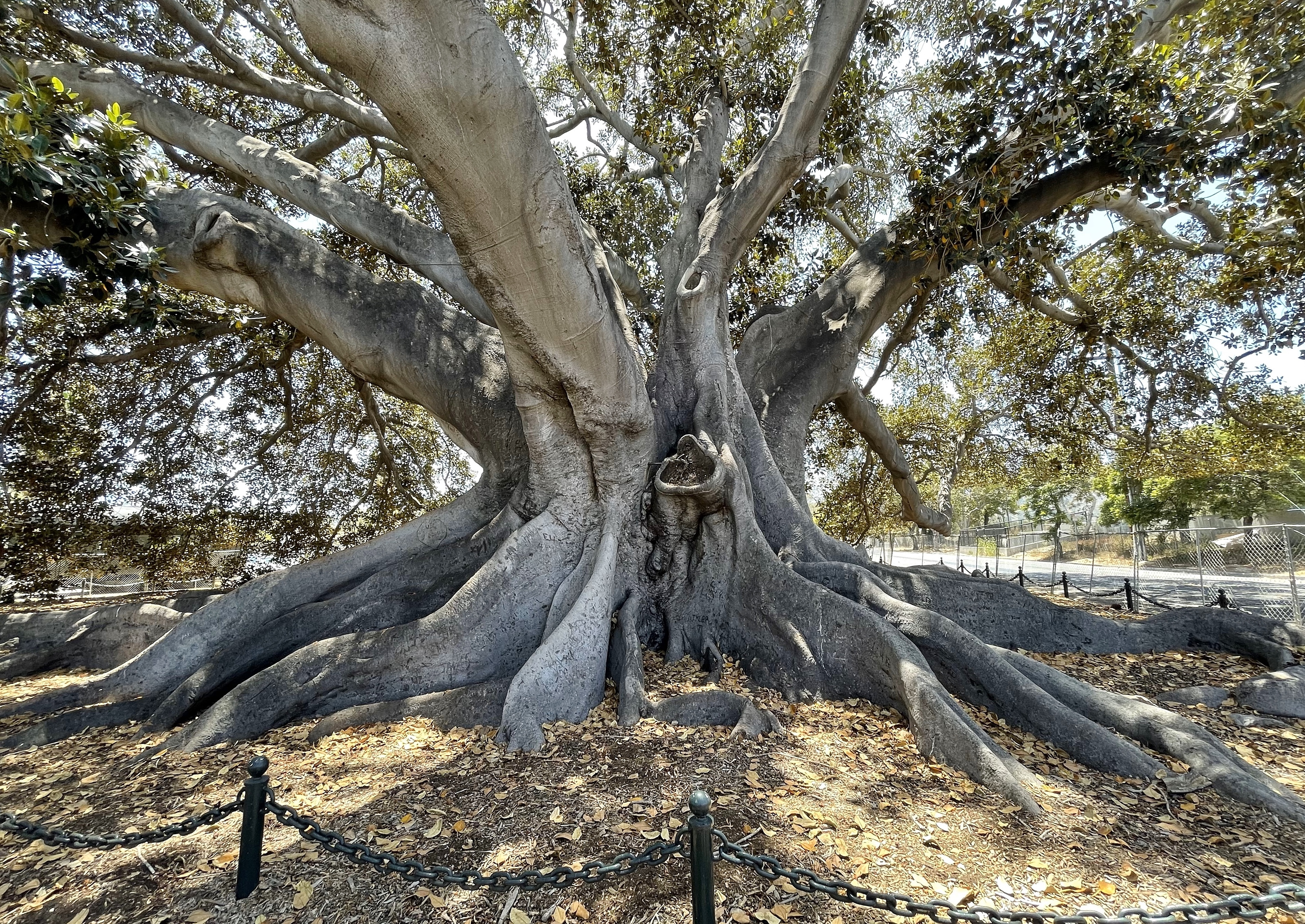
Close-up of trunk (June 2022)

Santa Barbara's Moreton Bay Fig Tree located in Santa Barbara, California is believed to be the largest Ficus macrophylla in the United States.

An Australian seaman visiting Santa Barbara in 1876 presented a seedling of an Australian Moreton Bay fig tree to a local girl who planted it at 201 State Street. After the girl moved away a year later, her girlfriend, Adeline Crabb, transplanted the tree to the corner of Montecito and Chapala streets, just a few blocks from the ocean, on land then owned by the Southern Pacific Transportation Company. The tree was officially designated as a historic landmark in 1970, and the property was deeded to the City of Santa Barbara in 1976. The tree has since been placed on the California Register of Big Trees. The roots are protected by a chain barrier the size of the canopy. The tree may be viewed at the Amtrak Train Station, 209 State Street.

In July 1997, the circumference of the tree, measured at a height of 4.5 feet (1.4 m) above the ground, was 41.5 feet (12.6 m). The average crown spread was 176 feet (54 m) and the total height was 80 feet (24 m).

== See also ==
- List of individual trees
- Media related to Moreton Bay Fig Tree (Santa Barbara, California) at Wikimedia Commons
