= Bradbury House (Los Angeles) =

Historic house in California, United States

- U.S. National Register of Historic Places
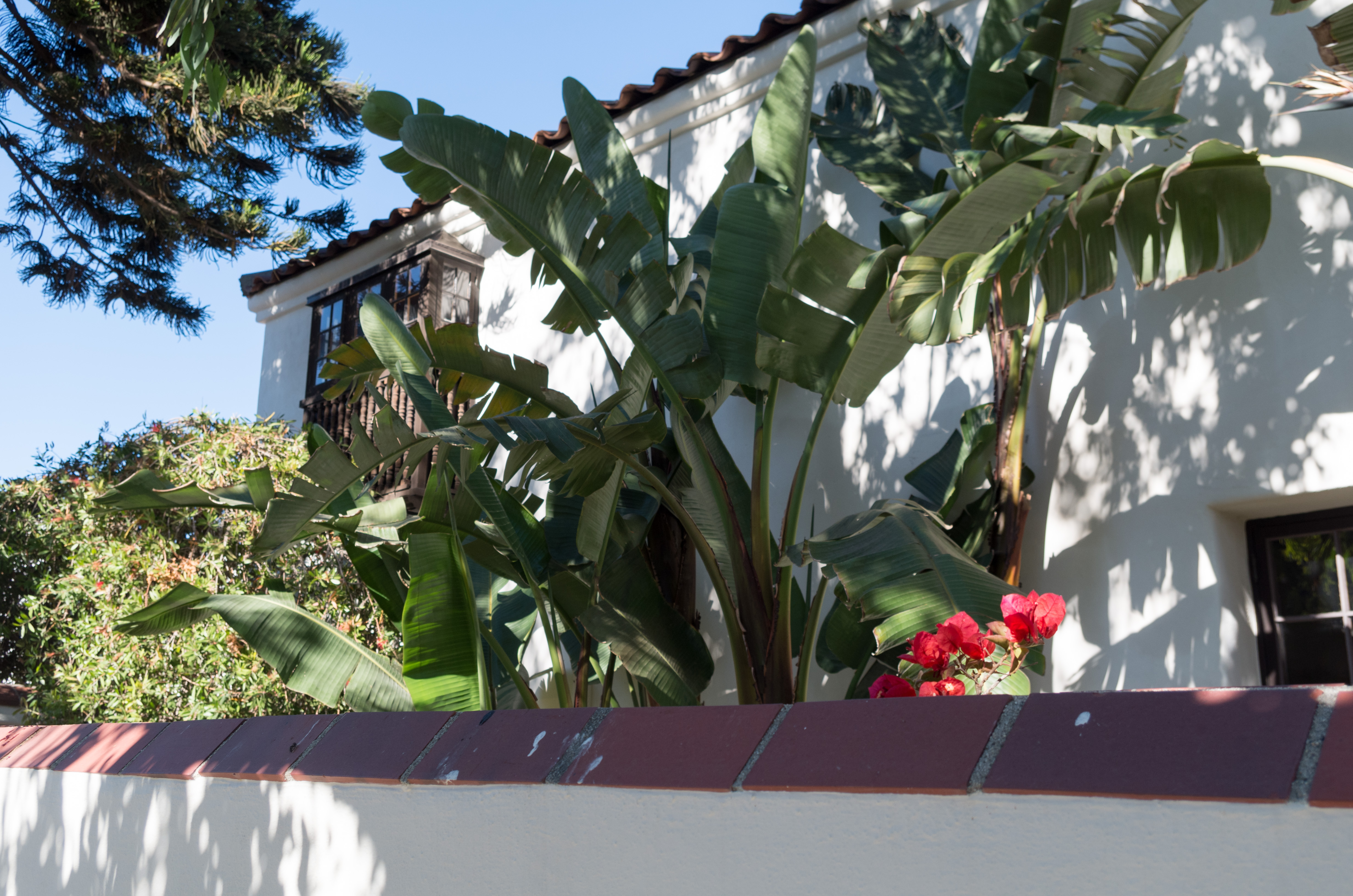
- Bradbury House in 2014

- Location within the Los Angeles metropolitan area Location within California Location within the United States
- Location: 102 Ocean Way, Los Angeles, California
- Coordinates: 34°1′39″N 118°30′57″W
- Area: 0.4 acres (0.16 ha)
- Architect: John Byers
- Architectural style: Mission/spanish Revival
- NRHP reference No.: 10000110
- Added to NRHP: March 22, 2010

The Bradbury House is a historic house in the Pacific Palisades Los Angeles, California, United States. It was designed in the Spanish Revival style by architect John Byers, and completed in 1923. Built for Lewis L Bradbury Jr whose father, Lewis L Bradbury, commissioned the construction of the Bradbury Building in Downtown Los Angeles. It has been listed on the National Register of Historic Places since March 22, 2010.

It is now a private residence.

== See also ==
- National Register of Historic Places listings in Los Angeles
