= Hancock Park =

Public park in Los Angeles, California, United States

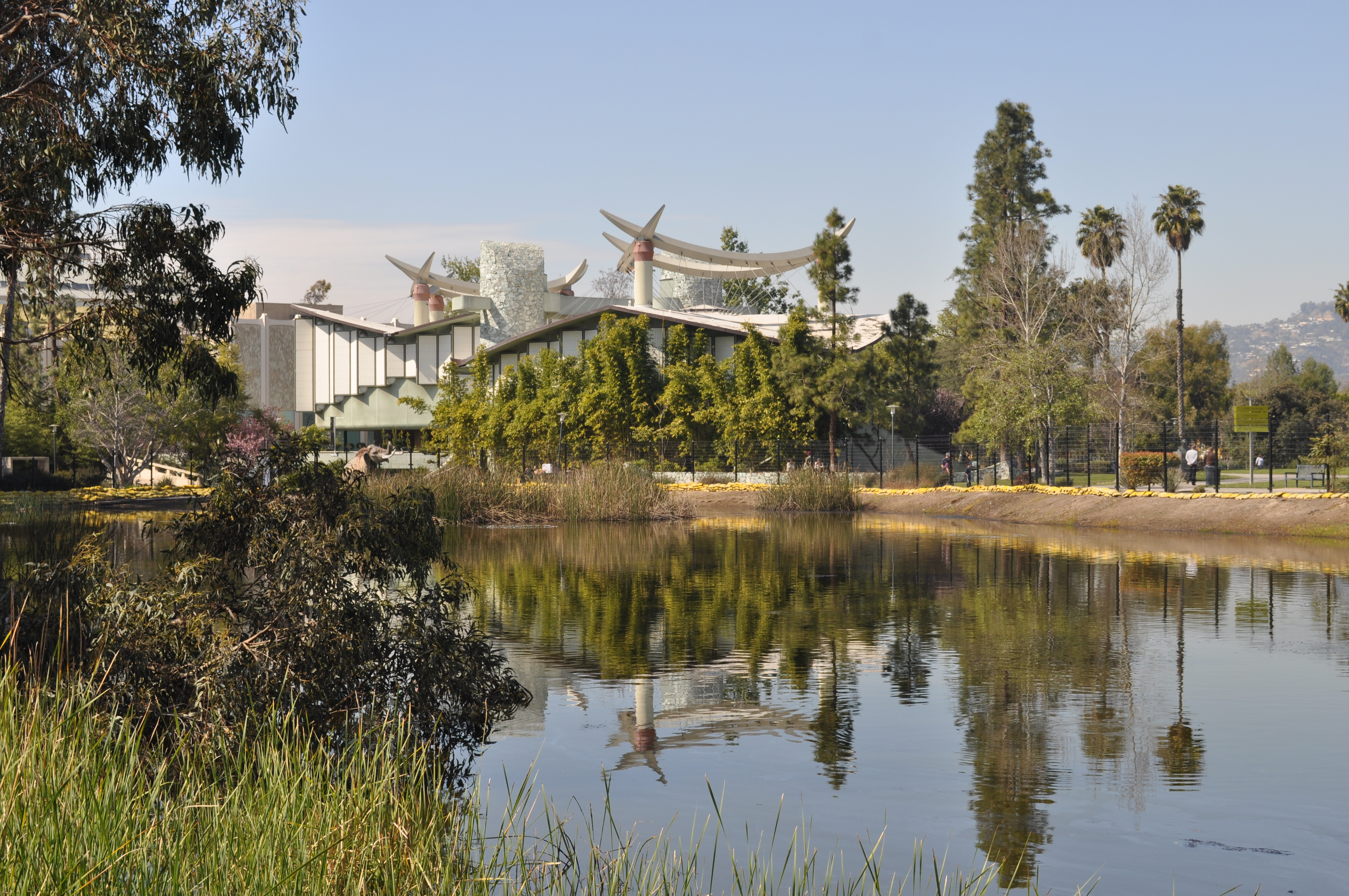
- Hancock Park, with tar pits and LACMA

- Location within the Los Angeles metropolitan area Location within California Location within the United States
- Type: Urban park
- Location: 5800 block of Wilshire Blvd, Miracle Mile, Los Angeles, California
- Coordinates: 34.0636°N 118.3568°W
- Operator: Los Angeles Department of Recreation & Parks

California Historical Landmark
- Official name: Hancock Park La Brea
- Reference no.: 170

Hancock Park is a city park in the Miracle Mile section of the Mid-Wilshire neighborhood in Los Angeles, California.

The park's destinations include the La Brea Tar Pits; the adjacent George C. Page Museum of La Brea Discoveries, which displays the fossils of Ice Age prehistoric mammals from the tar pits; and the Los Angeles County Museum of Art (LACMA) complex. They are among the most popular tourist attractions in Los Angeles.

== Geography ==
In 1939, the Federal Writers' Project American Guide to Los Angeles described Hancock Park as a 22 acres (8.9 ha) district bounded by "on the north side of Wilshire Blvd. between W. 6th St., Curson Ave., and Ogden Dr."

== Features ==
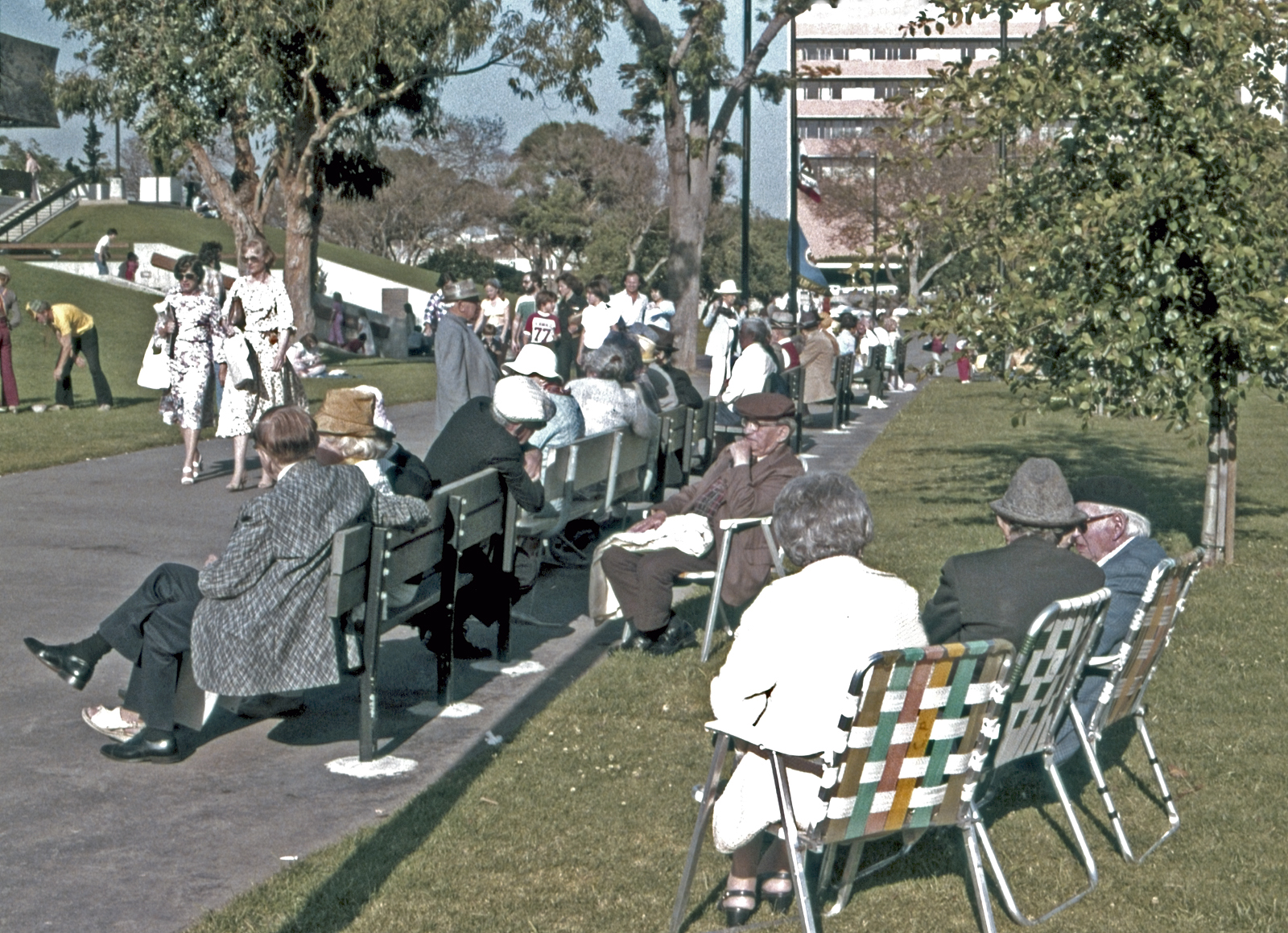
People enjoying Hancock Park (1978)

The park has urban open spaces and landscaped areas for walking, picnicking, and other recreation. Located on Wilshire Boulevard just east of Fairfax Avenue, it extends across a large city block and around two museums. The landmark Park La Brea complex is across 6th Street on the north. The Hancock Park neighborhood, is approximately 1 mile (1.6 km) to the northeast.

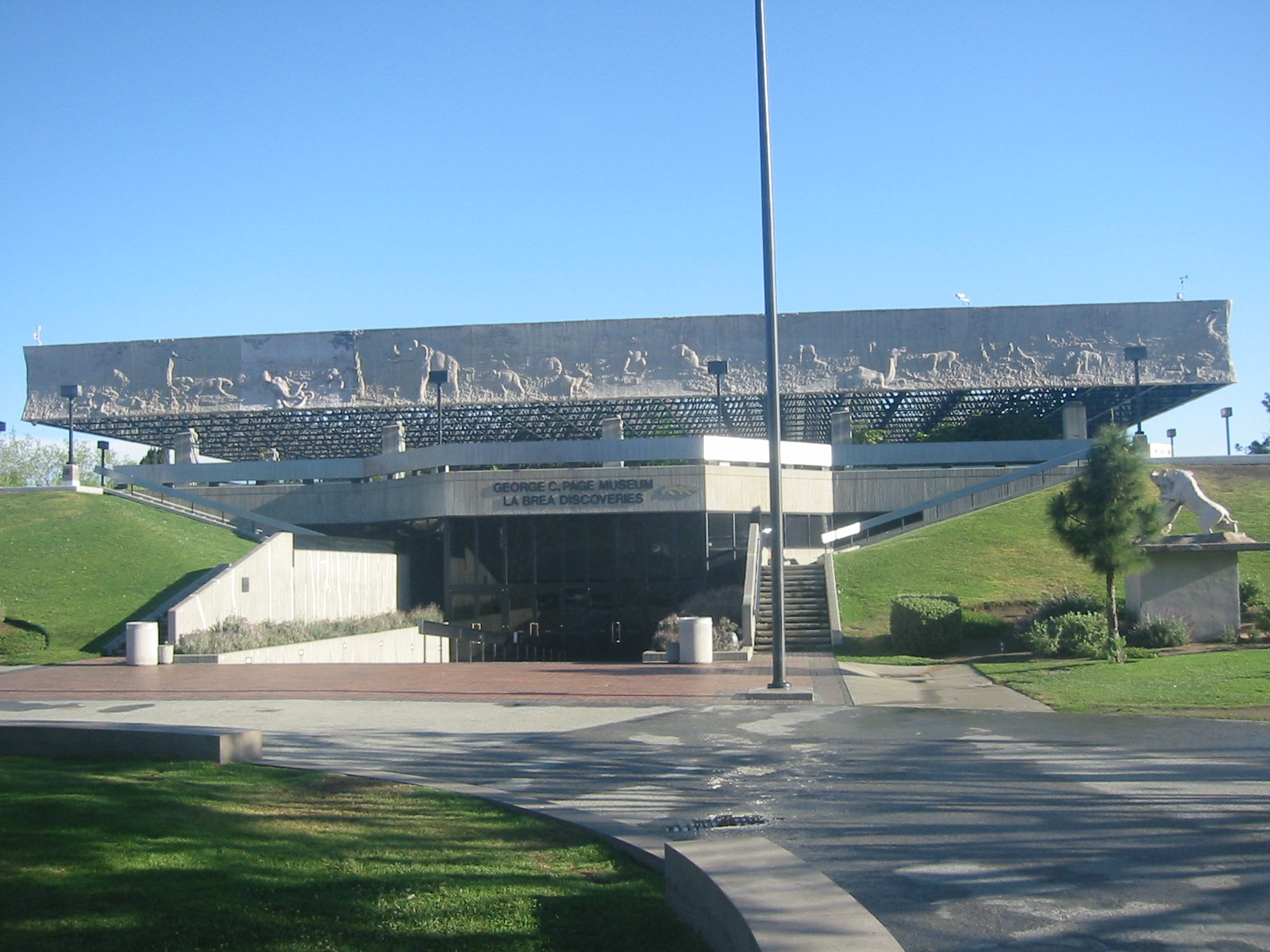
George C. Page Museum of La Brea Discoveries in the park

Hancock Park is the location of the La Brea Tar Pits, the George C. Page Museum of La Brea Discoveries overseen by the Natural History Museum of Los Angeles County, and the Los Angeles County Museum of Art (LACMA) campus of buildings and sculpture gardens.

The 1952 Mid-century modern style Observation Pit in the park, a repository for large Ice Age fossils from throughout the tar pit area, reopened in 2014 after being closed since the mid-1990s. It is part of the Page Museum's new Excavator Tour. The Pit 91 fossil excavation, also reopened in 2014 for excavations and public viewing, had closed in 2006 to focus on fossils newly uncovered during excavation for LACMA's new subterranean parking garage in the park's western area. The skeleton of a near-complete Columbian mammoth was among the excavated discoveries there.

The Pleistocene Garden recreates the original prehistoric landscape habitats in the Hancock Park area, representing the native vegetation of the Los Angeles Basin 10,000 to 40,000 years ago. The plant list was created from 35 years of research in the Pit 91 fossil excavation. It represents four ecoregions, Coastal sage scrub, Riparian, Deep Canyon California oak woodlands, and California montane chaparral.

== History ==
Hancock Park was created in 1924 when George Allan Hancock donated 23 acres (9.3 ha) of the Hancock Ranch to the County of Los Angeles with the stipulation that the park be preserved and the fossils properly exhibited.

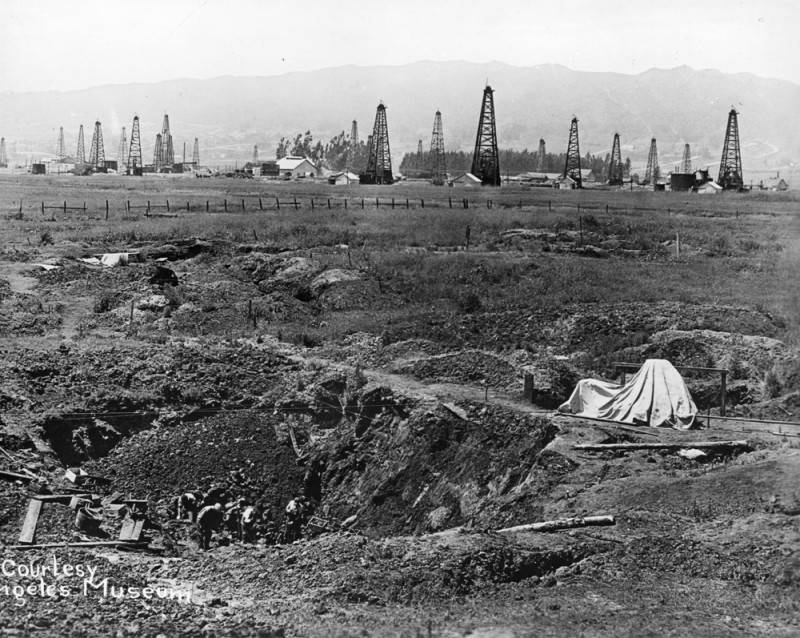
Fossil miners at work. 1911

The park is named for its benefactor, George Hancock, a California petroleum industry pioneer, who recognized the scientific importance of the fossils found in the asphaltic deposits. He inherited the 3,000-acre Rancho La Brea (1,200 ha) in 1883 that included the La Brea tar pits, and found animal bones when digging for oil at them.

Until 1875, bones found in the asphalt deposits were considered remains of domestic stock and native mammals of the region. In that year scientist William Denton published the first mention of the occurrence of extinct fauna at Rancho La Brea.

It was not until 1901 that the bones on the Hancock Ranch were thoroughly studied by William Warren Orcutt, a prominent Los Angeles geologist and petroleum pioneer. who examined bones he personally collected. Orcutt collected bones of saber-toothed cat, dire wolf, ground sloth and other fossils from the site, bringing the attention of the scientific community to the value of the La Brea Tarpits in understanding the late Pleistocene fauna and flora of North America. Orcutt eventually donated his fossil collection to John Campbell Merriam of the University of California.

The park is registered as California Historical Landmark #170. The La Brea Tar Pits are a designated U.S. National Natural Landmark.

=== Renovation ===
The park is to receive a renovation and makeover. A design was chosen in 2019 designed by Weiss/Manfredi. Renovation of existing Page Museum, new 40,000 square foot museum building including a new cafe and shop, renovating the existing entrances with canopies and welcome pavilions, reconfiguring on-site surface parking, and reconfiguring pedestrian paths for ADA compliance.

== California Historical Landmark Marker ==
California Historical Landmark Marker NO. 170 at the site reads:

- NO. 170 HANCOCK PARK LA BREA - The bones of thousands of prehistoric animals that had been entrapped during the Ice Age in pools of tar that bubbled from beneath the ground were exhumed from this site. First historic reference to the pools, part of the 1840 Rancho La Brea land grant, was recorded by Gaspar de Portolá in 1769 - first scientific excavations were made by the University of California in 1906. The site was presented to the County of Los Angeles in 1916 by Captain G. Allan Hancock to be developed as a scientific monument.

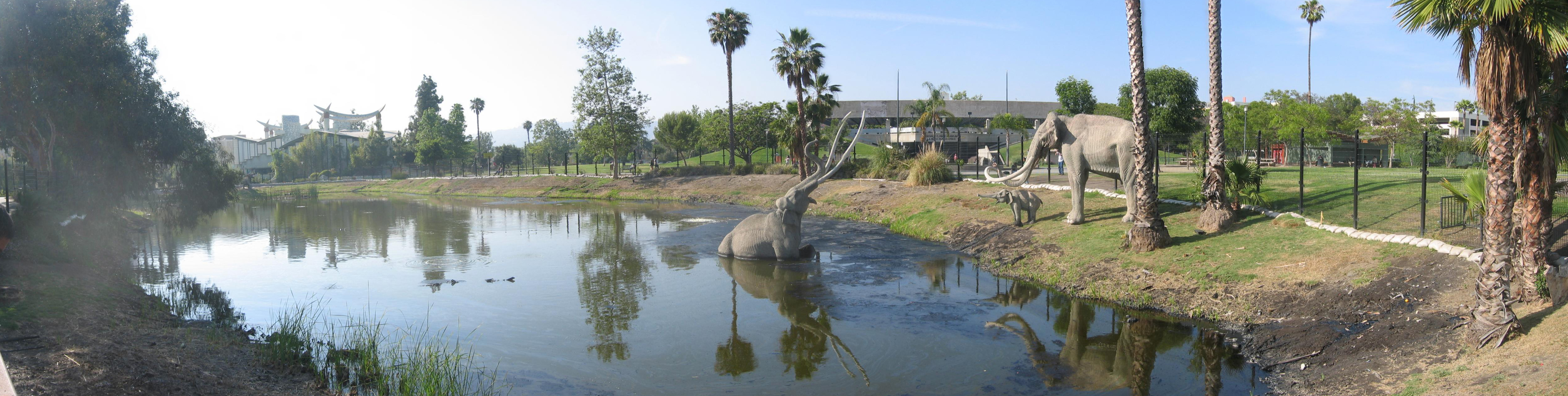
Panorama of a tar pit pond with sculptures of prehistoric mammals in Hancock Park.

== See also ==
- List of fossil species in the La Brea Tar Pits
- California Historical Landmarks in Los Angeles County, California
- Lagerstätte, fossil formations
- Ranchos of Los Angeles County, California, Spanish and Mexican land grant ranchos
