= Velero III =

Patrol vessel of the United States Navy

History
- Name: Velero III
- Owner: George Allan Hancock
- Port of registry: Los Angeles, California
- Builder: Craig Shipbuilding
- Laid down: June 16, 1930
- Launched: April 2, 1931
- Identification: U.S. Official number: 230891
- Fate: Sold and operated under Kuwaiti flag in 1949

General characteristics
- Length: 193 feet (58.8 m) length overall; 190 feet (57.9 m) length waterline
- Beam: 30 feet (9.1 m)
- Draft: 11 feet 9 inches (3.6 m) mean
- Crew: 18

Velero III was a motor vessel built for George Allan Hancock at Craig Shipbuilding, Long Beach, California, with the intention of using the vessel for both business and research. Hancock was a donor to the University of Southern California with Velero III eventually becoming R/V Velero III in research associated with the university and a sculpture of the vessel appears on the Hancock Institute for Marine Studies at U.S.C. The ship was purchased for war use by the Navy on December 15, 1941, and being commissioned as the USS Chalcedony designated PYC-16 on weather duty for the Hawaiian Sea Frontier.

In 1947 the vessel was being operated as the yacht Velero III for Nicholas A. Kessler and in 1948 was registered to Independent Tankships as the yacht Ahmady with the home port of Wilmington, Delaware. In 1949 the vessel was being operated under the Kuwaiti flag.

== Origins ==
George Allan Hancock had inherited Rancho La Brea and made his fortune in oil but had developed a scientific interest as a result of excavations at the La Brea Tar Pits on the ranch and, after exploring the pools on the ranch with his first boat, going to sea and eventually earning his master's papers. He had a number of boats with two earlier ones named Velero and Velero II. Captain Hancock took the first Velero from Los Angeles on January 30, 1921, on a cruise that was not scientific but later took Velero II as far as Panama with an amateur marine biologist that deepened his interest in scientific voyages. A Hancock owned and captained vessel following Velero II, Oaxaca, had carried twelve passengers including two representatives of the California Academy of Sciences on a voyage as far as the Galápagos Islands in 1927. In 1931 Hancock had a new vessel constructed and returned to the name Velero with that being the third of the name.

== Construction and design ==
Velero III was explicitly designed by naval architect G. Bruce Newby at Hancock's instruction to both appear and perform in a similar manner to the new United States Coast Guard cutters being built on the Pacific Coast.

Interior spaces had many yacht like features but were intentionally simple but a "grand stairway" connected owner's and guest's quarters. The interior was insulated with cork and had forced ventilation.

The steel vessel was 193 feet (58.8 m) length overall, 190 feet (57.9 m) in length at the waterline, 30 feet (9.1 m) in beam and a mean draft of 11 feet 9 inches (3.6 m). Propulsion was by two six cylinder Winton diesel engines of 850 shaft horsepower for a cruising speed of 15.75 knots (18.12 mph; 29.17 km/h) and, with a 54,000 US gallons (204,412.2 L) fuel oil capacity, a cruising range of 9,500 nautical miles (10,900 mi; 17,600 km) at 14 knots (16 mph; 26 km/h). Electrical power was provided by two 20 kilowatt belt driven generators on the main shaft and two 75 kilowatt generators driven by 115 shaft horsepower Winton engines with 900 ampere-hour batteries on line to provide power before generators are started or as emergency power. Fresh water, 18,000 US gallons (68,137.4 L), was provided in two equally divided separate systems for drinking and another for washing and showering.

Navigating equipment included a Sperry gyrocompass and autopilot, a radio range finder and a fathometer. Velero III carried two 24 feet (7.3 m) steel motor whaleboats and two 24 feet (7.3 m) wooden fishing and shore boats.

== Voyages ==
Hancock's early voyages collected specimens but became organized into a more scientific collection with creation of the Allan Hancock Foundation for Scientific Research, the vessel itself becoming registered to the Allan Hancock Pacific Expeditions and Hancock Hall on the University of Southern California campus to house the collection. Velero III was donated with the foundation to the university in 1939. From 1931 until 1941 the vessel's collection efforts were largely in marine invertebrate zoology between San Francisco and Peru and at the end equaled or surpassed collection efforts in that field by previous ships with Hancock Hall at the university being built as a repository for the collection and data. An example of the work is found in the description of documentation of the early voyage extending from Mexico to the Galápagos during which collection was made at twenty-three stations.

Velero III expeditions included one exception to the Eastern Pacific work with a voyage into the Caribbean. Voyages between 1931 and presentation of the vessel to the university in 1939 were conducted by Captain Hancock. On one such trip to the Galápagos Captain Hancock would attempt to identify two bodies found on Marchena Island and check on a colony of German "Back to nature" enthusiasts on Floreana Island, then known as Charles Island.

== Navy acquisition ==
On December 15, 1941 Velero III was acquired by the Maritime Commission from the University of Southern California and turned over to the Navy which had the vessel converted to wartime use at San Diego Marine Construction Company before commissioning February 27, 1942 as USS Chalcedony designated PYC-16 with Lieutenant (junior grade) Erwin E. Smith, USNR commanding. Chalcedony served at San Diego with the 11th Naval District until sailing for Hawaii on April 21, 1942, for weather station duty with the Hawaiian Sea Frontier. On November 5, 1945 Chalcedony departed Pearl Harbor arriving San Francisco November 15 where she was decommissioned on January 10, 1946, and on October 17 delivered to the Maritime Commission for disposal.

== Post war ==
At the end of the war Velero III was examined by Hancock for resuming foundation work but his conclusion was that a new vessel was required. In 1947 the vessel was being operated as the yacht Velero III for Nicholas A. Kessler, Los Angeles, and in 1948 was registered to Independent Tankships, Washington, D.C., as the yacht Ahmady with the home port of Wilmington, Delaware. In 1949 the vessel was being operated under the Kuwaiti flag.

== Successor ==
On April 11, 1948 Velero IV was launched at National Iron Works, San Diego with dignitaries of the University of Southern California, the Foundation, Navy and science participating. That vessel is still active as of 2015 operating out of Seattle.

== Bibliography ==
- "An Island Mystery/Sails For South Seas to Solve Mystery Deaths". Chicago Daily Tribune. November 23, 1934.
- Fraser, Charles McLean (1943). General account of the scientific work of the Velero III in the eastern Pacific, 1931–41. Los Angeles: University of Southern California Press. Archived from the original on 30 September 2015.
- Meredith, De Witt (Dr.) (1939). Voyages of the Velero III. Los Angeles: Bookhaven Press. LCCN 96846856.
- Naval History And Heritage Command. "Chalcedony". Dictionary of American Naval Fighting Ships. Naval History And Heritage Command.
- Newby, G. Bruce (1931). "A New Type Business and Research Cruiser". Pacific Marine Review. 28 (December). San Francisco: J.S. Hines: 361–364, 396.
- "Craig Shipbuilding Company". Pacific Marine Review. 28 (August). San Francisco: J.S. Hines. 1931.
- Seale, Alvin (1932). Log of the G. Allan Hancock Expedition to the Galapagos Islands, December 1, 1931 to March 1, 1932. OCLC WorldCat. OCLC 62524782.
- Williams, Greg H. (2013). World War II U.S. Navy Vessels In Private Hands : The Boats and Ships Sold and Registered For Commercial and Recreational Purposes Under the American Flag. Jefferson, North Carolina: McFarland & Company, Inc. p. 110. ISBN 9780786466450. LCCN 2012048527.
- University of Southern California. "Allan Hancock Foundation". University of Southern California.
- University of Southern California (1948). General account of the scientific work of the Velero III in the eastern Pacific, 1931–41. Allan Hancock Foundation Collection. Los Angeles: University of Southern California. Archived from the original on 30 September 2015.
- University of Southern California (1948). Proceedings of the Launching of the Velero IV. Los Angeles: University of Southern California.
- Velero IV Charters, LLC. "History".
