= William Orcutt =

William Orcutt may refer to:

- William Warren Orcutt (1869–1942), petroleum geologist
- William Dana Orcutt (1870–1953), American book designer, typeface designer, historian, and author
