= Ida Hancock Ross =

American landowner (1843–1913)

Ida Hancock Ross (née Haraszthy; 1843 – March 15, 1913) was the owner of the Rancho La Brea in Los Angeles County, including the La Brea Tar Pits. When she died, she was one of the richest women in California.

Ross was born in Imperial, Illinois. Her mother, Eleonora Dedinszky de Dedina, was a noblewoman of Polish descent whose family had lived in Hungary for centuries. Her father, Count Agoston Haraszthy, was a titled nobleman who had been exiled from Hungary for "efforts to obtain freedom from what he considered despotism." The family became the first Hungarians to become American citizens. They lived in Wisconsin for many years before moving to California.

The family moved to California when Ross was 6 years old, but in 1851, she went east with her mother and some siblings, remaining there for five years to complete her education. She went with her mother to Paris in 1860 and spent two years there.

After Ross began leasing sections of her property for drilling for oil, she "found herself an immensely rich woman." She used part of her increased wealth to have a "colossal villa" built at the corner of Wilshire Boulevard and Vermont Avenue in Los Angeles. The residence, completed in 1909, included a replica of a "huge carved-wood fireplace" found in a castle in England, a 1865 stained-glass window, and a music salon that contained 18th-century antiques from the Mexican palace of Emperor Maximilian.

She married Major Henry Hancock, a native of New Hampshire, in 1863. Their son, George Allan Hancock, donated Rancho La Brea to Los Angeles County. Hancock died in 1883. In 1909, she married attorney Erskine M. Ross.

Although her importance in the history of Los Angeles is forgotten today, several streets still bear the name: Rosslyn Street, Rossmore Avenue, Rosswell Street, and Rosswood Terrace.

On March 15, 1913, Ross died in Los Angeles at age 70.
