= Mangelia hancocki =

Scientific classification
- Kingdom: Animalia
- Phylum: Mollusca
- Class: Gastropoda
- Subclass: Caenogastropoda
- Order: Neogastropoda
- Superfamily: Conoidea
- Family: Mangeliidae
- Genus: Mangelia
- Species: M. hancocki

Binomial name
- Mangelia hancocki Hertlein & A.M. Strong, 1939

Extinct species of gastropod

Mangelia hancocki is an extinct species of sea snail, a marine gastropod mollusc in the family Mangeliidae. This fossil was discovered in the Galapagos Islands by Leo George Hertlein (1898–1972) and Archibald McClure Strong (1876 - 1951), who were there as a part of the Valero III's voyage to the tropical eastern Pacific. It was named for Captain G. Allan Hancock, the owner and captain of the Valero III. There are only two known collections of this species, both by Leo George Hertlein.

== Description ==
Full description from the original article.

"Shell small, slender, with three and a half smooth nuclear whorls and five strongly sculptured normal whorls; axial sculpture of fourteen, low rounded, nearly vertical ribs; spiral sculpture of two, strong, rounded cords on the lower portion of the whorls which rise to elongated tubercles where they cross over the axial ribs; above these there are on the second whorl one, on the third whorl two, and the fourth whorl three, smaller spiral cords which ride over the axial ribs but with less ten- dency to form tubercles; the periphery of the last whorl marked by a sulcus about as wide as the space between the two major spiral cords; below this is a nodulous spiral cord similar to the two major spiral cords on the upper whorls; base and canal with six spiral cords similar to those on the upper portion of the whorls; outer lip thickened; with a small, rounded, unarmed anal sinus close to the suture, bounded on the inside of the outer lip by a strong denticle, immediately below which there are two smaller denticles; canal short, slightly recurved. The shell is white with irregularly disposed patches of brown, darker in the interspaces between the spiral cords. The type measures: length, 4.0 mm.; diameter, 1.5 mm."

== Location of Discovery ==
From original article

Holotype, No. 4693 Calif. Acad. Sci. Paleo. Type Coll., from Loc. 27255 (C. A. S.), raised beach, 5 to 10 meters above sea level, at James Bay, James (San Salvador) Island, Galapagos Islands; L. G. Hertlein, collector. Pleistocene.

== Distribution ==
This extinct marine species was found in Pleistocene strata in the Galapagos Islands and in Quaternary strata of Ecuador; age range: 5.332 to 0.012 Ma

== Authors Notes ==
L. G. Hertlein and A. M. Strong left the following notes about this species.

In size, shape and general appearance this shell is quite similar to "Mangelia" (Steironepion) melanosticta Pilsbry and Lowe^{12} but differs in the greater number of spiral cords and in the color pattern. The apparently smooth nuclear whorls are somewhat worn and in fresh specimens may show the spiral keel of Steironepion.

This species is named for Captain G. Allan Hancock, owner and captain of the exploration cruiser Velero III, through whose courtesy the senior author was privileged to accompany the expedition to the Galapagos Islands in 1931-1932.
