= Henry Hancock =

American politician

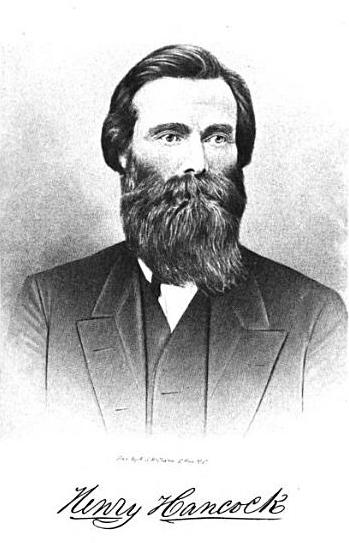
Henry Hancock's portrait and signature from a book published in 1921

Henry Hancock (April 11, 1822 – January 9, 1883) was a lawyer and a land surveyor working in California in the 1850s. He was the owner of Rancho La Brea, which included the La Brea Tar Pits.

== Early life ==
Henry Hancock was born in Bath, New Hampshire, a son of Thomas Hancock and his wife Lucy (Smith) Hancock, and grandson of Henry Hancock and Abigail (Cotton) Hancock. He was of English ancestry, his grandfather having emigrated from Somerset in the 18th century.

Hancock entered the Norwich Military Academy, then studied law at Harvard University. Graduating in 1846, he went to St. Louis, Missouri, where he became a surveyor. During the Mexican–American War, he was quartermaster of the 1st Regiment Missouri Mounted Volunteers under Colonel Alexander William Doniphan. At the war's end, he returned home to New Hampshire but soon decided to go west.

== Life in California ==
Hancock sailed from Chicago to San Francisco. He arrived in California in September 1849 and opened a law office. He then tried his hand at gold mining on American River, but in 1850 moved to Los Angeles.

Hancock engaged extensively in government surveying. In the early 1850s, the rancheros who had received their land grants during the Mexican and Spanish occupation of California were required to prove their claims to the new American government. They filed claims with the United States Land Commission and had to have their property surveyed and mapped by government surveyors. Henry Hancock surveyed Rancho San Pedro for the Dominguez family, Rancho San Francisco for the Del Valles, Rancho San José owned by the Palomares and Vejar families; and Henry Dalton's Rancho Azusa de Dalton. He also served as the city surveyor for Los Angeles.

In 1854, Hancock, along with Benjamin Davis Wilson, bought Rancho Rodeo de las Aguas. Hancock was elected to the California State Assembly as a Democrat, representing the 1st District from 1858 to 1860.

As a lawyer, Henry Hancock worked for the Rocha family to aid them with their efforts to prove their claim to Rancho La Brea. The Rochas finally won their claim, but like so many other rancheros, their legal expenses left them broke. In 1860 Jose Jorge Rocha, the son of Don Antonio Jose Rocha, deeded Rancho La Brea to Henry Hancock.

During the American Civil War (1861–1865), when there was considerable Confederate sympathy in Southern California, Hancock sided with the Union. He became major of the 4th California Infantry Regiment and for a time was commanding officer of Camp Drum, established to guard against pro-Confederate activities near Los Angeles. He also was sent to Santa Catalina Island to survey it and chose the location for its Union garrison.

After the war, Hancock engaged in the commercial development of the asphaltum deposits on Rancho La Brea. He promoted its use for sidewalk and paving purposes, and shipped considerable quantities to San Francisco by schooner. The brown asphaltum was also used as fuel by Los Angeles manufacturing establishments during the 1880s.

It was at Yiorgos Caralambo's cabin on Hancock's ranch that the notorious outlaw Tiburcio Vásquez was captured in 1874.

In 1863 Hancock married Ida Haraszthy (Ida Hancock Ross), the daughter of Agoston Haraszthy, the "Father of Modern Viticulture in California". They were the parents of two sons, George Allan Hancock and Bertram Hancock (who died in childhood). Henry Hancock died in Los Angeles at age 61 in 1883.

== See also ==
- La Brea Tar Pits
- Rancho La Brea
