= Orcutt, California =

- Unincorporated community Census-designated place
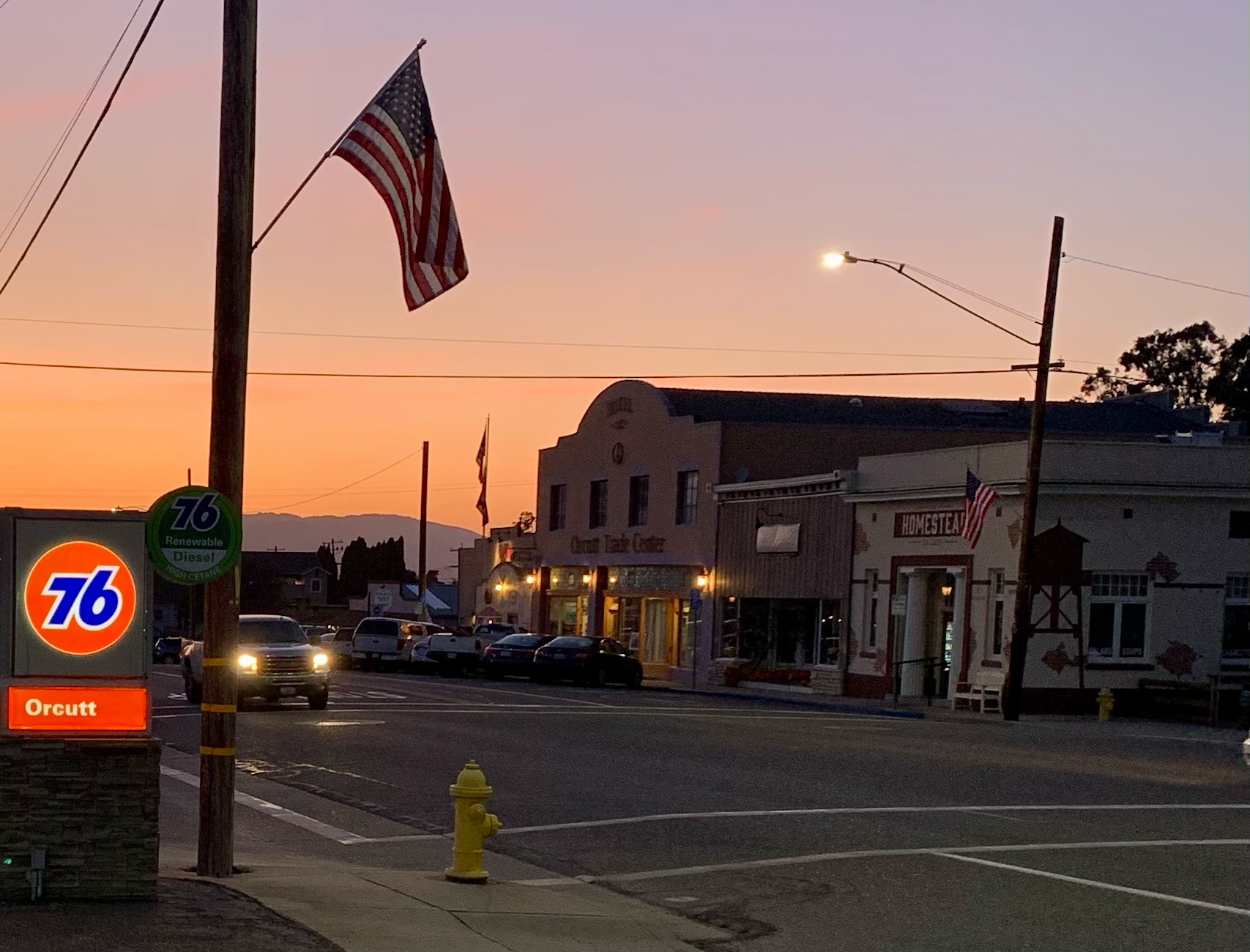
- Clark Avenue in downtown Old Orcutt, looking west, between Highways 1 and 135

- Location in Santa Barbara County and the state of California

- Location in the United States
- Coordinates: 34°52′28″N 120°25′41″W
- Country: United States
- State: California
- County: Santa Barbara

Government
  - State Senator: Monique Limón (D)
  - Assemblymember: Gregg Hart (D)
  - U. S. Rep.: Salud Carbajal (D)

Area
  - Total: 10.824 sq mi (28.034 km^{2})
  - Land: 10.822 sq mi (28.029 km^{2})
  - Water: 0.0019 sq mi (0.005 km^{2}) 0.02%
- Elevation: 358 ft (109 m)

Population (2020)
  - Total: 32,034
  - Density: 2,960.1/sq mi (1,142.9/km^{2})
- Time zone: UTC-8 (PST)
  - Summer (DST): UTC-7 (PDT)
- ZIP codes: 93455, 93457
- Area code: 805
- FIPS code: 06-54120
- GNIS feature IDs: 1661153, 2408999

Orcutt is an unincorporated town in Santa Barbara County, California, United States. Located in the Santa Maria Valley, Orcutt is named for William Warren Orcutt, the manager of the Geological, Land and Engineering Departments of the Union Oil Company.

The population of Orcutt was 32,034 at the 2020 census, up from 28,905 at the 2010 census. For statistical purposes, the United States Census Bureau has defined Orcutt as a census-designated place.

== History ==
Orcutt is named for William Warren Orcutt, the manager of the Geological, Land and Engineering Departments of the Union Oil Company. Known as the “Dean of Petroleum Geologists" Orcutt is credited with discovering fossilized prehistoric animal bones preserved in pools of asphalt on the Hancock Ranch. These would be the first of many fossils excavated from the La Brea Tar Pits. In commemoration of Orcutt's initial discovery, paleontologists named the La Brea Coyote in W.W. Orcutt's honor, Canis orcutti.

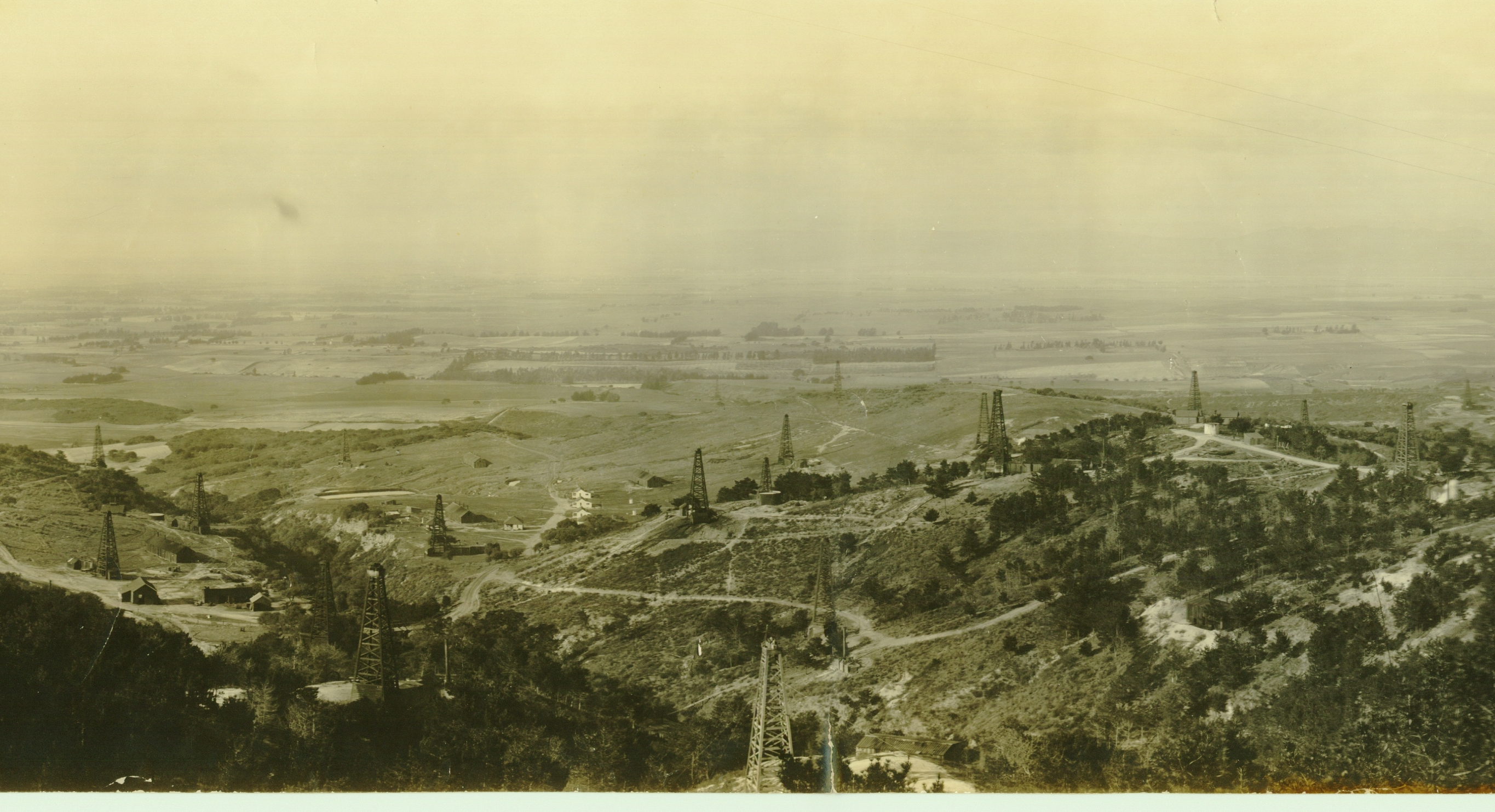
Orcutt Oil Field (1911)

== Geography ==
According to the United States Census Bureau, the CDP has a total area of 10.8 square miles (28 km^{2}), 99.98% of which is land and 0.02% of which is water.

Orcutt, originally sited along a railroad siding of the Pacific Coast Railroad as a townsite for oil field workers, is now primarily a bedroom community/suburb of Santa Maria, which is adjacent to the north. Located between California State Route 135 on the east and south, and the Cabrillo Highway (Route 1) on the west, the community's northern boundary is the southern side of the Foxenwood section of Santa Maria. In 2005 it was one of the fastest-growing places in Santa Barbara County.

=== Climate ===
This region experiences warm (but not hot) and dry summers, with no average monthly temperatures above 71.6 °F. According to the Köppen Climate Classification system, Orcutt has a warm-summer Mediterranean climate, abbreviated "Csb" on climate maps.

Climate data for Orcutt, California
Month	Jan	Feb	Mar	Apr	May	Jun	Jul	Aug	Sep	Oct	Nov	Dec	Year
Mean daily maximum °F (°C)	64.2 (17.9)	64.7 (18.2)	66.4 (19.1)	68.6 (20.3)	70.2 (21.2)	72.9 (22.7)	75.2 (24.0)	76.0 (24.4)	76.3 (24.6)	74.8 (23.8)	69.4 (20.8)	64.1 (17.8)	70.2 (21.2)
Mean daily minimum °F (°C)	39.6 (4.2)	41.7 (5.4)	43.2 (6.2)	44.2 (6.8)	47.3 (8.5)	50.2 (10.1)	52.8 (11.6)	53.4 (11.9)	51.8 (11.0)	48.3 (9.1)	43.3 (6.3)	38.8 (3.8)	46.2 (7.9)
Average precipitation inches (mm)	2.89 (73)	3.45 (88)	3.10 (79)	0.93 (24)	0.32 (8.1)	0.05 (1.3)	0.03 (0.76)	0.05 (1.3)	0.31 (7.9)	0.54 (14)	1.32 (34)	2.02 (51)	15.01 (381)
Source 1:
Source 2:

== Demographics ==
Historical population
Census	Pop.	Note	%±
2000	28,830		—
2010	28,905		0.3%
2020	32,034		10.8%
U.S. Decennial Census; 1860–1870 1880-1890; 1900 1910 1920; 1930 1940 1950; 1960 1970 1980; 1990 2000 2010; 2020

Orcutt first appeared as a census designated place in the 2000 U.S. census.

=== Racial and ethnic composition ===
Orcutt CDP, California – Racial and ethnic composition Note: the US Census treats Hispanic/Latino as an ethnic category. This table excludes Latinos from the racial categories and assigns them to a separate category. Hispanics/Latinos may be of any race.
Race / Ethnicity (NH = Non-Hispanic)	Pop 2000	Pop 2010	Pop 2020	% 2000	% 2010	% 2020
White alone (NH)	22,479	19,667	17,953	77.97%	68.04%	56.04%
Black or African American alone (NH)	390	375	337	1.35%	1.30%	1.05%
Native American or Alaska Native alone (NH)	170	162	169	0.59%	0.56%	0.53%
Asian alone (NH)	878	1,012	1,160	3.05%	3.50%	3.62%
Native Hawaiian or Pacific Islander alone (NH)	21	54	52	0.07%	0.19%	0.16%
Other race alone (NH)	37	35	130	0.13%	0.12%	0.41%
Mixed race or Multiracial (NH)	690	730	1,663	2.39%	2.53%	5.19%
Hispanic or Latino (any race)	4,165	6,870	10,570	14.45%	23.77%	33.00%
Total	28,830	28,905	32,034	100.00%	100.00%	100.00%

=== 2020 census ===
As of the 2020 census, Orcutt had a population of 32,034 and a population density of 2,960.1 inhabitants per square mile (1,142.9/km^{2}). The census reported that 99.6% of residents lived in households, 0.3% lived in non-institutionalized group quarters, and 0.1% were institutionalized.

The median age was 41.7 years; 22.9% of residents were under the age of 18 and 20.3% were 65 years of age or older. For every 100 females there were 94.8 males, and for every 100 females age 18 and over there were 92.1 males age 18 and over.

There were 11,592 households in Orcutt; 31.8% had children under the age of 18 living in them. Of all households, 56.1% were married-couple households, 5.5% were cohabiting couple households, 24.0% had a female householder with no partner present, and 14.4% had a male householder with no partner present. About 21.9% of all households were made up of individuals and 13.3% had someone living alone who was 65 years of age or older. The average household size was 2.75. There were 8,428 families (72.7% of all households).

There were 11,928 housing units at an average density of 1,102.2 units per square mile (425.6 units/km^{2}), of which 11,592 (97.2%) were occupied. Of these, 76.8% were owner-occupied and 23.2% were occupied by renters. The homeowner vacancy rate was 0.9% and the rental vacancy rate was 2.8%; overall 2.8% of housing units were vacant.

98.2% of residents lived in urban areas, while 1.8% lived in rural areas.

Racial composition as of the 2020 census
Race	Number	Percent
White	20,752	64.8%
Black or African American	372	1.2%
American Indian and Alaska Native	541	1.7%
Asian	1,314	4.1%
Native Hawaiian and Other Pacific Islander	61	0.2%
Some other race	3,282	10.2%
Two or more races	5,712	17.8%
Hispanic or Latino (of any race)	10,570	33.0%

=== 2010 census ===
At the 2010 census Orcutt had a population of 28,905. The population density was 2,597.2 inhabitants per square mile (1,002.8/km^{2}). The racial makeup of Orcutt was 22,680 (80.6%) White, 394 (1.4%) African American, 347 (1.2%) Native American, 1,129 (3.9%) Asian, 60 (0.2%) Pacific Islander, 235 (0.9%) from other races, and 1,293 (4.5%) from two or more races. Hispanic or Latino of any race were 5,630 persons (20%).

The census reported that 28,792 people (99.6% of the population) lived in households, 86 (0.3%) lived in non-institutionalized group quarters, and 27 (0.1%) were institutionalized.

There were 10,631 households, 3,638 (34.2%) had children under the age of 18 living in them, 6,272 (59.0%) were opposite-sex married couples living together, 1,130 (10.6%) had a female householder with no husband present, 481 (4.5%) had a male householder with no wife present. There were 417 (3.9%) unmarried opposite-sex partnerships, and 57 (0.5%) same-sex married couples or partnerships. 2,279 households (21.4%) were one person and 1,300 (12.2%) had someone living alone who was 65 or older. The average household size was 2.71. There were 7,883 families (74.2% of households); the average family size was 3.14.

The age distribution was 7,034 people (24.3%) under the age of 18, 2,295 people (7.9%) aged 18 to 24, 6,157 people (21.3%) aged 25 to 44, 8,327 people (28.8%) aged 45 to 64, and 5,092 people (17.6%) who were 65 or older. The median age was 42.3 years. For every 100 females, there were 96.1 males. For every 100 females age 18 and over, there were 92.7 males.

There were 11,133 housing units at an average density of 1,000.3 per square mile, of the occupied units 8,304 (78.1%) were owner-occupied and 2,327 (21.9%) were rented. The homeowner vacancy rate was 1.9%; the rental vacancy rate was 4.5%. 22,043 people (76.3% of the population) lived in owner-occupied housing units and 6,749 people (23.3%) lived in rental housing units.

=== 2023 American Community Survey ===
In 2023, the US Census Bureau estimated that 10.5% of the population were foreign-born. Of all people aged 5 or older, 79.8% spoke only English at home, 16.4% spoke Spanish, 1.3% spoke other Indo-European languages, 2.2% spoke Asian or Pacific Islander languages, and 0.3% spoke other languages. Of those aged 25 or older, 91.4% were high school graduates and 32.1% had a bachelor's degree.

The median household income in 2023 was $108,682, and the per capita income was $49,178. About 4.0% of families and 6.6% of the population were below the poverty line.

== Education ==
Children in Orcutt attend schools in the Orcutt Union School District and Santa Maria Joint Union High School District. Schools in Orcutt Union School District, compared to other schools in California, rate in the 70th and 80th percentiles.

== Public safety ==
=== Law enforcement ===
As an unincorporated California community, Orcutt's general law enforcement services are provided by the Santa Barbara County Sheriff's Department. The California Highway Patrol's office in Santa Maria is responsible traffic law enforcement matters and traffic collision investigations. Lying within an unincorporated area, the community is under the responsibility of the Santa Barbara County Board of Supervisors.

== Notable people ==
- J. F. Chadband (1927-2016) - politician
