= George Allan Hancock =

American businessman

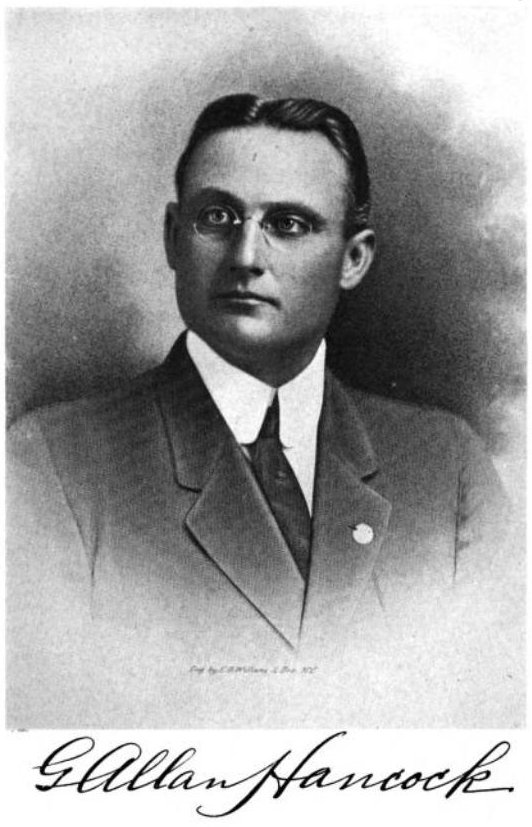
- George Allan Hancock's portrait and signature from a book published in 1921
- Born: July 26, 1875; San Francisco, California, U.S.
- Died: May 31, 1965 (aged 89); Santa Maria, California, U.S.
- Spouse: Genevieve Deane Mullen (m. 1901–1936)
- Children: 2

George Allan Hancock (July 26, 1875 – May 31, 1965) was the owner of the Rancho La Brea Oil Company. He inherited Rancho La Brea, including the La Brea Tar Pits which he donated to Los Angeles County. He also developed Hancock Park, Los Angeles. He was vice president of the Los Angeles Hibernian Bank, treasurer of the Los Angeles Symphony Association, and president of the Automobile Association of Southern California. He owned the Santa Maria Valley Railroad, established Rosemary Farm, and developed the Santa Maria Ice and Cold Storage Plant.

== Biography ==
Captain G. Allan Hancock was born in San Francisco, California, on July 26, 1875. He was the son of Major Henry Hancock and Ida Haraszthy Hancock (Ida Hancock Ross). His maternal grandfather was Count Agoston Haraszthy, the "Father of California Viticulture". Hancock received his early education in the primary schools and at Brewer's Military Academy in San Mateo, California, which he attended during 1888 and 1889. In 1890, he enrolled as a student at the Belmont School in Belmont, California. Hancock was eight years old when his father died in 1884. He continued in the management and operation of La Brea ranch until he was 25. Hancock married Genevieve Deane Mullen (1879–1936) in Los Angeles on November 27, 1901. They had two children: Bertram Hancock (1902–1925) and Rosemary Genevieve Hancock (1904–1977).

It was at this period that the early discoveries of petroleum were being made in California. Rancho La Brea was one of the localities in which petroleum was found. In 1900, Ida Hancock granted a 20-year lease to the Salt Lake Oil Company for 1,000 acres (4.0 km^{2}) of Rancho La Brea. Hancock abandoned his agricultural pursuits and turned his attention to petroleum production. In 1907, after spending three years studying the industry, he urged his mother to allow him enough capital to sink a well on a portion of the property that had not already been leased to oil operators. With the assistance of William Orcutt, Hancock drilled 71 wells near the family's ranch house. Every well produced oil and the Rancho La Brea Oil Company was born. The family's finances improved greatly with the beginning of oil pumping. The wells produced millions of barrels annually, resulting in the family becoming very wealthy. With that wealth, Hancock was able to pursue myriad interests and thus began a life of philanthropy.

Hancock died on May 31, 1965, of a heart attack in Santa Maria, California. His bequests continued his long-time support of numerous causes.

== Civic life and legacy ==
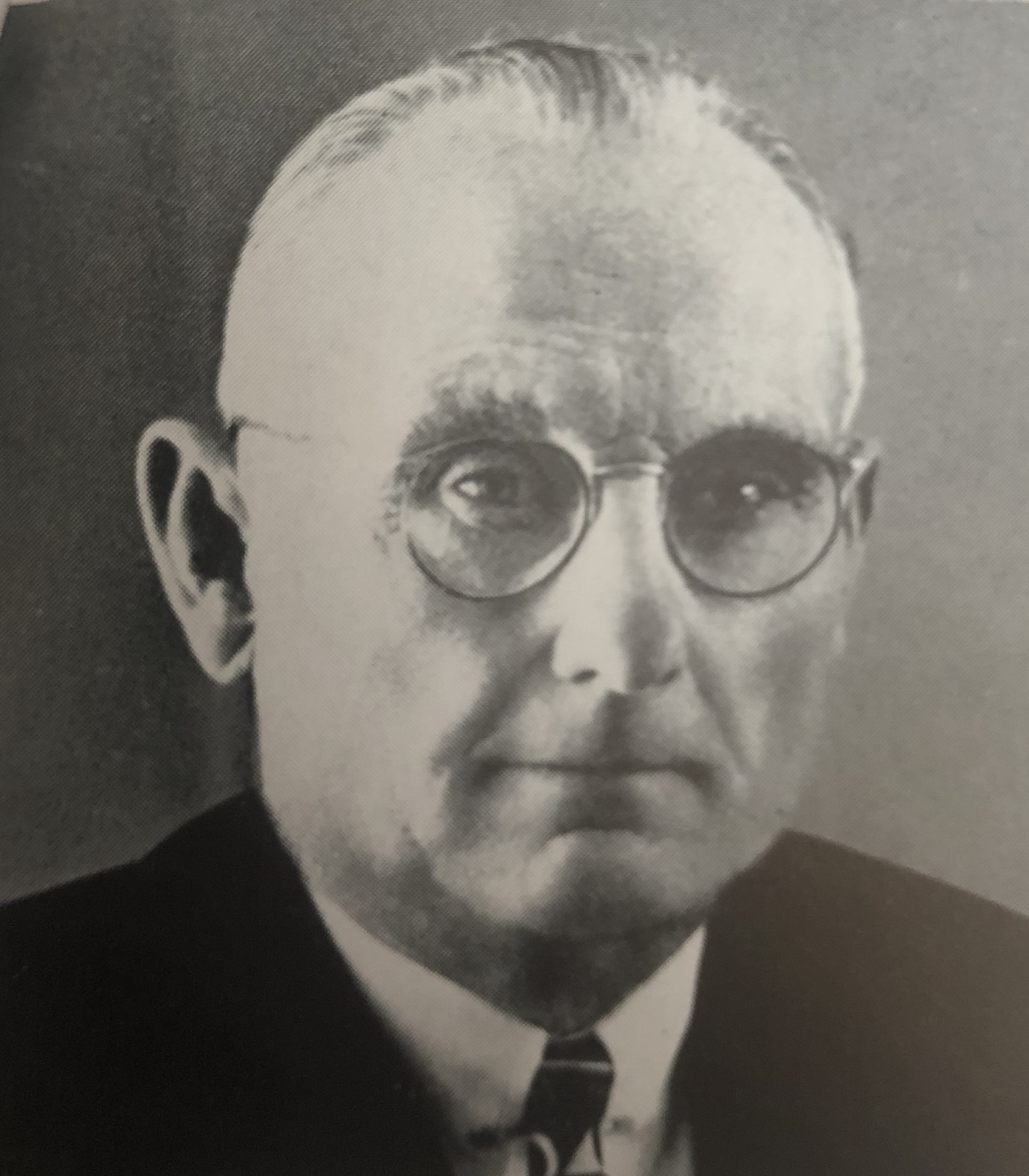
Hancock from the 1950 USC yearbook

Hancock was also interested in music and played the cello in the Los Angeles Symphony Orchestra. Hancock was a member of the Bohemian Club, the California Club, the Los Angeles Athletic Club, the Gamut Club, the Uplifters, the Knights of Columbus and a number of yacht clubs.

Hancock donated seven million dollars to the University of Southern California and founded the Allan Hancock Foundation (later the Hancock Institute for Marine Studies) at U.S.C. In 1931 he had the motor vessel Velero III, 193 feet (58.8 m) in length overall, built at Craig Shipbuilding, Long Beach, California, with the intention of using the vessel for both business and research. The vessel was used for private oceanographic research and exploration, making trips to the Galápagos Islands, before being donated to the University of Southern California and later purchased for war use by the Navy on December 15, 1941, and being commissioned as the USS Chalcedony. On a trip to the Galápagos Captain Hancock would attempt to identify two bodies found on Marchena Island and check on a colony of German "Back to nature" enthusiasts on Floreana Island, then known as Charles Island. He also produced the silent film The Empress of Floreana.

Hancock also financed Charles Kingsford Smith's 1928 trans-Pacific flight in the Southern Cross. He was played by Alec Kellaway in the 1946 biopic Smithy. He was played by Richard Roxburgh in the 2024 film Eden.

The Allan Hancock College in Santa Maria, California, is named after him as well as the city's airport.

== See also ==
- Hancock Park, Los Angeles, California
- Santa Maria Public Airport
