= George C. Page =

American entrepreneur and philanthropist (1901–2000)

George C. Page (1901–2000) was an American real estate developer, shipper, entrepreneur, and philanthropist best known as the namesake of the Page Museum at the La Brea Tar Pits in Los Angeles, California.

== Early life ==
Page was born in Fremont, Nebraska. He lost his father at age five; Page and his brothers were raised by their mother as farmboys. When Page left for California at the age of 16, a goal he set four years earlier after tasting his first orange, the teenager had only $2.30 in his pocket. (Page later recalled, "I was so awed by the beauty of that piece of fruit that I said, 'I hope someday I can live where that came from.'")

== Founding of Mission Pak ==
Page worked as a busboy (which he initially believed meant steering a bus) and a soda jerk until he had earned $1000. With this capital, in 1917, he bought a vacant store and founded a distribution company, Mission Pak, which shipped California fruits such as oranges as holiday gifts to cold-weather customers.

The idea came to Page as he boxed oranges home to his mother and brother one year earlier: 37 residents at his boardinghouse had asked if he would do them the same courtesy; the company proved enormously successful. (The Mission Pak jingle is still familiar to many older Angelenos: "Say the Magic words, say Mission Pak and it's on its merry way! No gift so bright, so gay, so right, give the Mission Pak magic way!")

Mr. Page was interviewed for Studs Terkel's book, The Good War, about his experiences as an entrepreneur and real estate developer during World War II. At the time of Page's death, the president of the Natural History Museum of Los Angeles County observed, "The story of George C. Page embodies the American dream. His like will not come our way again."

== Entrepreneur ==
Capitalizing on his shipping company's success, Page founded a sports-car manufacturing plant. After selling Mission Pak in 1946, Page moved into real estate development; he built industrial and commercial parks, and leased space to the defense and aerospace industries and the federal government. Having begun as a packager, Page thought this brought an edge to real estate; Page was always attentive to the value good landscaping could add to a project.

== Philanthropist ==
Page financed the construction of buildings at Children's Hospital Los Angeles (the George C. Page Building), at Loyola Marymount University (George C. Page Stadium), and in the district of Hawthorne, Los Angeles (the George C. Page Youth Center), along with arts programs at the University of Southern California and buildings and scholarships at Pepperdine University in Malibu. The Pepperdine University Law School dormitories are named in his honor.

== The La Brea Tar Pits ==
Page had begun visiting the La Brea Tar Pits while in his late teens; it troubled him that to move from pits to the disinterred fossilized remains required a seven-mile (11.3 km) trip to the Natural History museum. A half-century later, the museum that bears his name was opened to the public in April 1977. Page had devoted great care into each element of the museum—attractive fossil presentation, so it would not simply be "bones, bones, bones"; testing the most comfortable underfoot surface—carpet, not marble—and limiting the museum to exhibits that could be easily covered in about an hour. Among the site's visitors, five million in its first decade, were professional curators interested to see what Page, as an amateur, had put together. "The thing that made me feel awfully good," Page told the Los Angeles Times in 1982, " was that they said, 'George Page, we have never been in a museum with things displayed so well.'"

Page described The George C. Page Museum as a kind of living bouquet he had presented to the city: "This is so living, so immediate. It's like giving flowers that I can smell while I'm still here."
