= Los Angeles Hibernian Bank =

Los Angeles-based banking company

- Headquarters: Los Angeles, California

Los Angeles Hibernian Bank was a Los Angeles-based banking company. In 1988 was put up for sale by its Hong Kong–based parent First Pacific Holdings. Security Pacific agreed to buy Hibernian Bank for an agreed figure of $160 million; included in the sale was their approximate 35 branches.

At the time of the sale, Hibernian Bank was the 13th-largest bank in the state of California, with assets of $1.57 billion.
