= William Warren Orcutt =

Petroleum geologist

William W. Orcutt

William Warren Orcutt (February 14, 1869 – 1942) was a petroleum geologist who is considered a pioneer in the development of oil production in California, and the use of geology in the oil industry. He is also known for his contributions to paleontology, which brought the fossils of the La Brea Tar Pits to the attention of the scientific community.

== Life and career ==
Orcutt was born in Dodge County, Minnesota on February 14, 1869. His family moved west and settled in Ventura, California, when he was 12 years old. After graduating from Stanford University with a degree in geology and engineering in 1895, he was employed as a civil and hydraulic engineer and as a United States Deputy Surveyor until 1899. That year he joined the Union Oil Company of California as superintendent of its San Joaquin Valley Division; he would stay with Union Oil, eventually becoming a Vice-President and a member of the board, until he retired in 1939. In 1901, when he was made manager of the geological, land, and engineering departments of the company, he moved to Los Angeles. In 1904 Union Oil instructed him to create a town to house the growing workforce needed for the booming Santa Maria oil field in Santa Barbara County, California. Over Orcutt's objections the company insisted on naming the new town, Orcutt, California, after him.

Before Orcutt, oil production in the Western U.S. had made little use of geological science; his work, which included making the first geological maps of the Coalinga, Lompoc, and Santa Maria oils fields and the application of geologic science and engineering principles to problems with oil production, changed this. Union Oil became the first oil company operating in the state of California to have a department of geology, and his efforts led to the use of geology being a standard part of oil production in the West. In 1923 Orcutt wrote a paper tracing the history of oil production in California, which he presented to the American Association of Petroleum Geologists. Orcutt served in the California National Guard from 1895 to 1897, was a Reserve Engineer during WWI, and during WWII served on the local draft board from 1940 until he died in 1942.

=== Discovery of La Brea Tar Pits fossils ===
Orcutt discovered fossils embedded in the asphalt deposits on the Hancock Ranch shortly after he moved to Los Angeles in 1901. Fossils found in the La Brea Tar Pits had been mentioned in the scientific literature as early as 1875, but it was not until Orcutt collected saber-toothed cat, dire wolf, ground sloth and other fossils from the site that the scientific community recognized the value of the La Brea Tar Pits in understanding the late Pleistocene fauna and flora of North America. Orcutt eventually gave his fossil collection to John Campbell Merriam of the University of California.

== Legacy ==
Because of his important role in developing the oil industry in the Western United States, in addition to Orcutt, California, the town of Orcutt, Colorado is named in his honor. Paleontologists named the prehistoric La Brea Coyote, Canis orcutti, in honor of his discoveries at the La Brea tar pits.

The 1920s residence, gardens, and orchards on the San Fernando Valley ranch he and his wife Mary used for vacations and their retirement estate was designated a Los Angeles Historic-Cultural Monument, and bequeathed to the city of Los Angeles as the Orcutt Ranch Horticulture Center.
