= Rancho La Brea =

Mexican land grant in California

Coordinates: 34.070°N 118.300°W

- Land grant
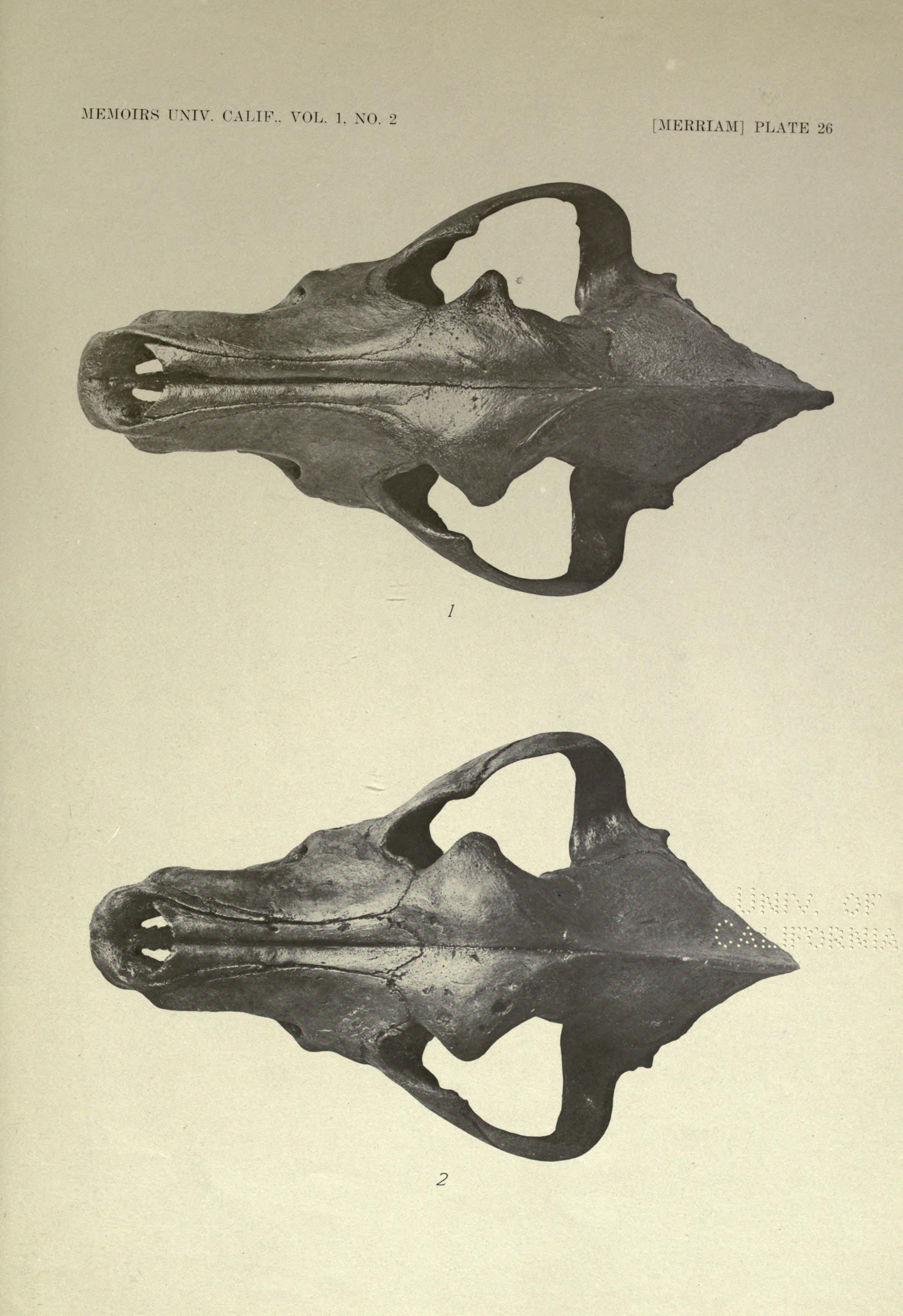
- The fauna of Rancho La Brea, by John C. Merriam
- Interactive map of Rancho La Brea
- Country: United States
- State: California
- County: Los Angeles
- Established: 1828

Area
  - Total: 17.96 km^{2} (6.93 sq mi)

Rancho La Brea was a 4,439-acre (17.96 km^{2}) Mexican land grant in present-day Los Angeles County, California, United States, given in 1828 to Antonio Jose Rocha and Nemisio Dominguez by José Antonio Carrillo, the alcalde of Los Angeles. Rancho La Brea consisted of one square league of land of what is now Wilshire's Miracle Mile, Hollywood, and parts of West Hollywood. The grant included the famous La Brea Tar Pits.

== History ==
The title awarded by the alcalde in 1828 was confirmed by José María de Echeandía, governor of Alta California; in 1840, it was reconfirmed by Governor Juan Alvarado.

With the cession of California to the United States after the Mexican–American War, the 1848 Treaty of Guadalupe Hidalgo provided that the land grants would be honored. As required by the Land Act of 1851, a claim was filed by Antonio José Rocha, José Jorge Rocha, and Josefa de la Merced de Jordan with the Public Land Commission in 1852, but it was rejected in 1860. As a lawyer and surveyor, Henry Hancock worked for the Rocha family to aid them with their efforts to prove their claim to Rancho La Brea. The Rochas finally won their claim (the grant was recorded as patented to "A. J. Rocha et al." in 1873). The grant included the famous La Brea Tar Pits.

As happened to other rancheros, the claimants' legal expenses left them broke. In 1860, Antonio José Rocha's son, José Jorge Rocha, deeded Rancho La Brea to Henry Hancock. Hancock paid $20,000 for the Mexican grants (at $2 or $3 per acre) with his profits from the sale of gold he had found in a rich placer mine. He engaged in the commercial development of the tar deposits on Rancho La Brea. He shipped considerable quantities to San Francisco by schooner. After Hancock's death in 1883, it was owned by his wife, Ida Hancock Ross. Most of Rancho La Brea was later subdivided and developed by his surviving son, Captain George Allan Hancock. He owned the Rancho La Brea Oil Company and donated 23 acres (93,000 m^{2}) of Hancock Park to Los Angeles County in 1924 to preserve and exhibit the fossils exhumed from Rancho La Brea. The La Brea Tar Pits within the Park are a now registered National Natural Landmark.

Arthur Gilmore bought some of the Rancho land in the 1890s and started a dairy farm. Drilling for water, he struck oil. This find was named the Salt Lake Oil Field after the company that drilled for him. Arthur's son, Earl Gilmore, built Gilmore Stadium next to Gilmore Field.

== See also ==
- Ranchos of California
- List of Ranchos of California
- List of rancho land grants in Los Angeles County, California
