= La Brea Tar Pits =

Paleontological research site in Los Angeles

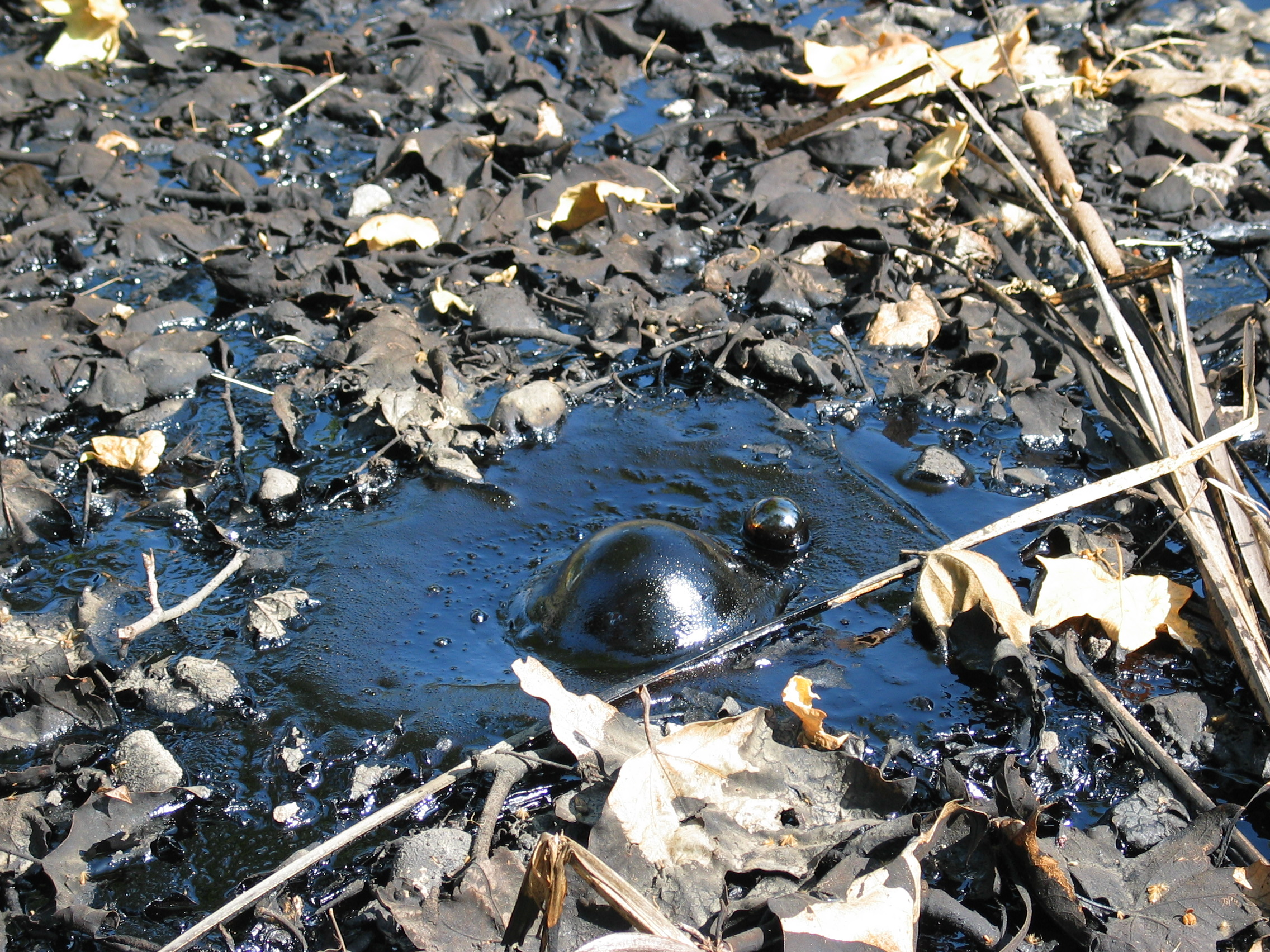
- Methane gas bubble emerging at La Brea Tar Pits (2004)

- Location within the Los Angeles metropolitan area Location within California Location within the United States
- Location: Hancock Park, Los Angeles, US
- Coordinates: 34°03′46″N 118°21′22″W
- Website: Official website

California Historical Landmark
- Official name: Hancock Park La Brea
- Reference no.: 170

U.S. National Natural Landmark
- Designated: 1964

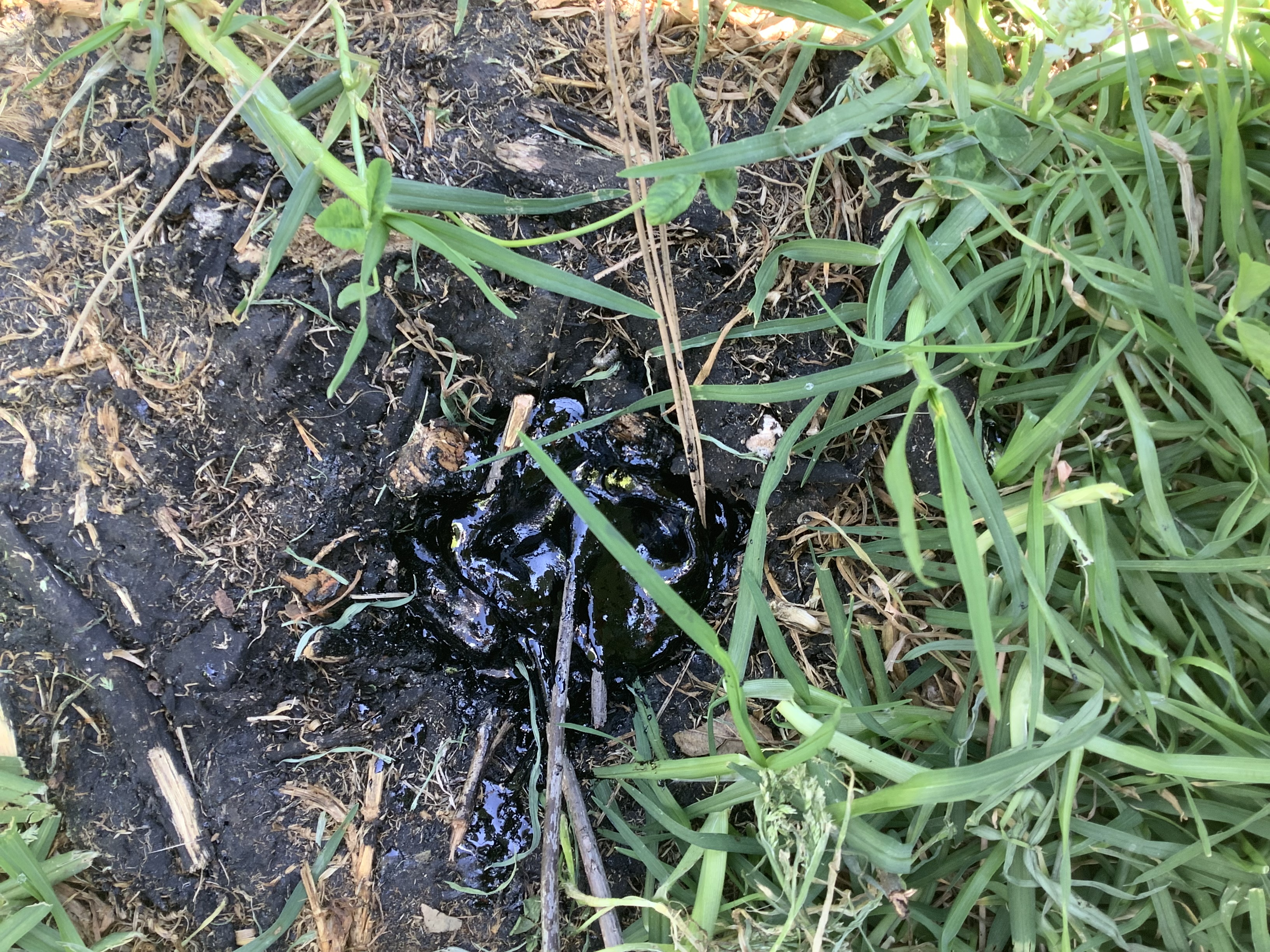
Small tar pit

The La Brea Tar Pits constitute an active paleontological research site located in urban Los Angeles, California, United States. Hancock Park was established around a cluster of tar pits formed by natural asphalt (also referred to as asphaltum, bitumen, pitch or brea in Spanish) that has continuously seeped upward from the ground for tens of thousands of years. Over centuries, these asphalt deposits trapped numerous prehistoric animals, preserving their skeletal remains. The site is home to the George C. Page Museum, dedicated to the ongoing excavation, research and public display of preserved specimens. The La Brea Tar Pits is recognized as a registered National Natural Landmark.

The museum closed on July 7, 2026 for a 2-year renovation.

== Formation ==
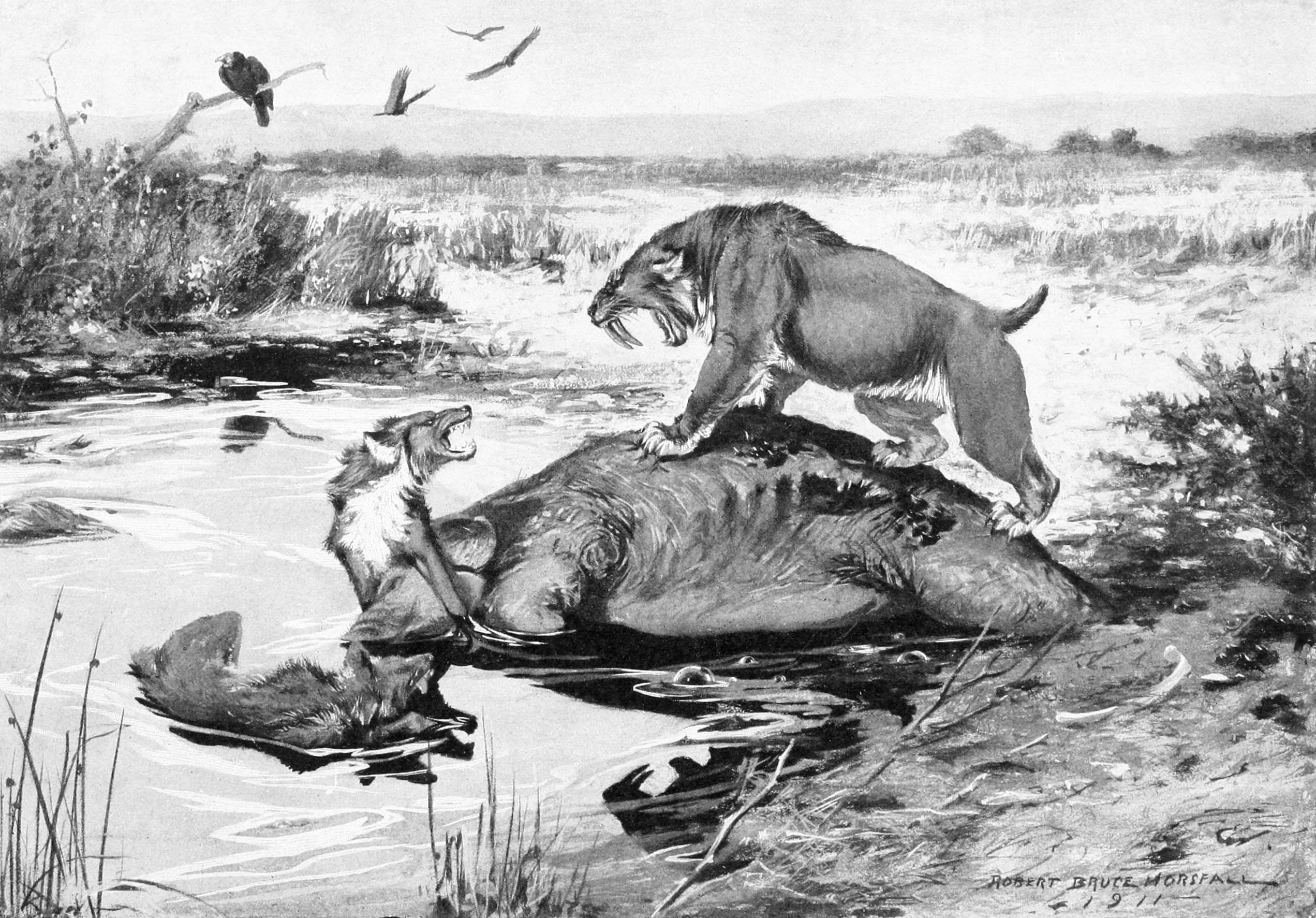
Illustration of several species getting mired in the tar pits

Tar pits are composed of heavy oil fractions, called gilsonite, which seep from the earth as oil. Crude oil seeps up along the 6th Street Fault from the Salt Lake Oil Field, which underlies much of the Fairfax District north of Hancock Park. The oil reaches the surface and forms pools, becoming asphalt as the lighter fractions of the petroleum biodegrade or evaporate. The asphalt then normally hardens into stubby mounds, which can be seen in several areas of the park.

This seepage has been happening for tens of thousands of years, during which the asphalt sometimes formed a deposit thick enough to trap animals. The deposit then became covered with water, dust, and leaves. Animals wandered in, became trapped, and died. Predators entered to eat the trapped animals and then, also became stuck, a phenomenon called a "predator trap". As the bones of a dead animal sank, the asphalt would soak into them, turning them dark-brown or black in color. Lighter fractions of petroleum evaporated from the asphalt, leaving a more solid substance, which then encased the bones.

Dramatic fossils of large mammals have been extricated, and the asphalt also preserves microfossils: wood and plant remnants, rodent bones, insects, mollusks, dust, seeds, leaves, and pollen grains. Examples of these are on display in the George C. Page Museum. Radiometric dating of preserved wood and bones has given an age of 38,000 years for the oldest known material from the La Brea seeps.

== History ==
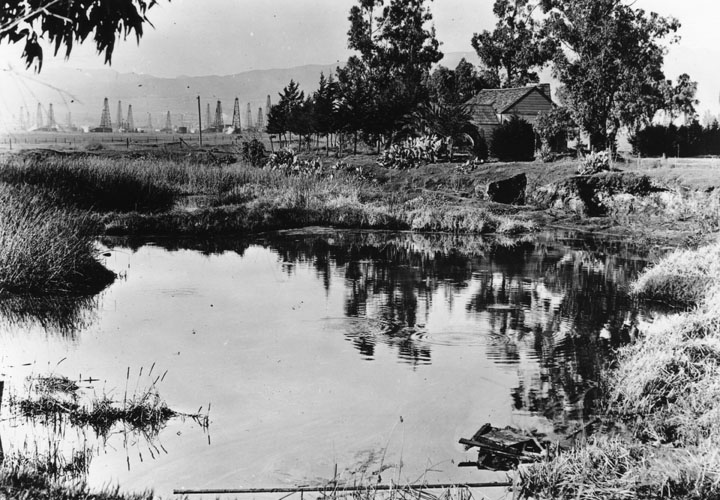
The Tar Pits in 1910. Oil derricks can be seen in the background.

The Chumash and Tongva people used tar from the pits to build plank boats by sealing planks of California redwood trunks that drifted into the Santa Barbara Channel, which they used to navigate the California coastline and Channel Islands.

Aside from supporting their boats, archaeological evidence suggests they used the tar for mending injuries. It was used to form casts for broken bones, and functioned as a poultice for them as well. There is evidence of the Chumash using the bitumen as a sort of gum, chewing on it.

A study by Sebastian Wärmländer, a researcher and archaeologist from Stockholm University, found that the tar contains polycyclic aromatic hydrocarbons (PAHs). 44 total were discovered, some of which were already known carcinogens. These PAHs pose a health risk, and likely as result of the medicinal applications, along with the consumption, Sebastian turned his studies to the health effects on the Chumash people. Upon studying over 200 skulls of adults, they noticed a decline in size and shape, as well as changes in the femurs of these adults. There is currently no direct confirmation that bitumen caused this decline, but researchers still speculate.

The Portolá expedition, a group of Spanish explorers led by Gaspar de Portolá, made the first written record of the tar pits in 1769. Father Juan Crespí wrote,

While crossing the basin, the scouts reported having seen some geysers of tar issuing from the ground like springs; it boils up molten, and the water runs to one side and the tar to the other. The scouts reported that they had come across many of these springs and had seen large swamps of them, enough, they said, to caulk many vessels. We were not so lucky ourselves as to see these tar geysers, much though we wished it; as it was some distance out of the way we were to take, the Governor [Portolá] did not want us to go past them. We christened them Los Volcanes de Brea [the Tar Volcanoes].

Harrison Rogers, who accompanied Jedediah Smith on his 1826 expedition to California, was shown a piece of the solidified asphalt while at Mission San Gabriel, and noted in his journal, "The Citizens of the Country make great use of it to pitch the roofs of their houses".

The La Brea Tar Pits and Hancock Park were formerly part of the Mexican land grant of Rancho La Brea. The original Rancho La Brea land grant stipulated that the tar pits be open to the public for the use of the local Pueblo. Another such requirement was that the Tongva people still had clear access to the tar pits for the sake of collecting resources. They required the tar for their construction efforts and such could not be cut off from the tar pits.

For some years, tar-covered bones were found on the property but were not initially recognized as fossils because the ranch had lost various animals—including horses, cattle, dogs, and even camels—whose bones closely resemble several of the fossil species. Initially, they mistook the bones in the pits for the remains of pronghorn or cattle that had become mired.

There were originally more than 100 separate pits of tar (or asphaltum) but most of those have been filled in with rock or dirt since settlement, leaving about a dozen accessible from ground level.

In 1886, the first excavation for land pitch in the village of La Brea was undertaken by Messrs Turnbull, Stewart & co..

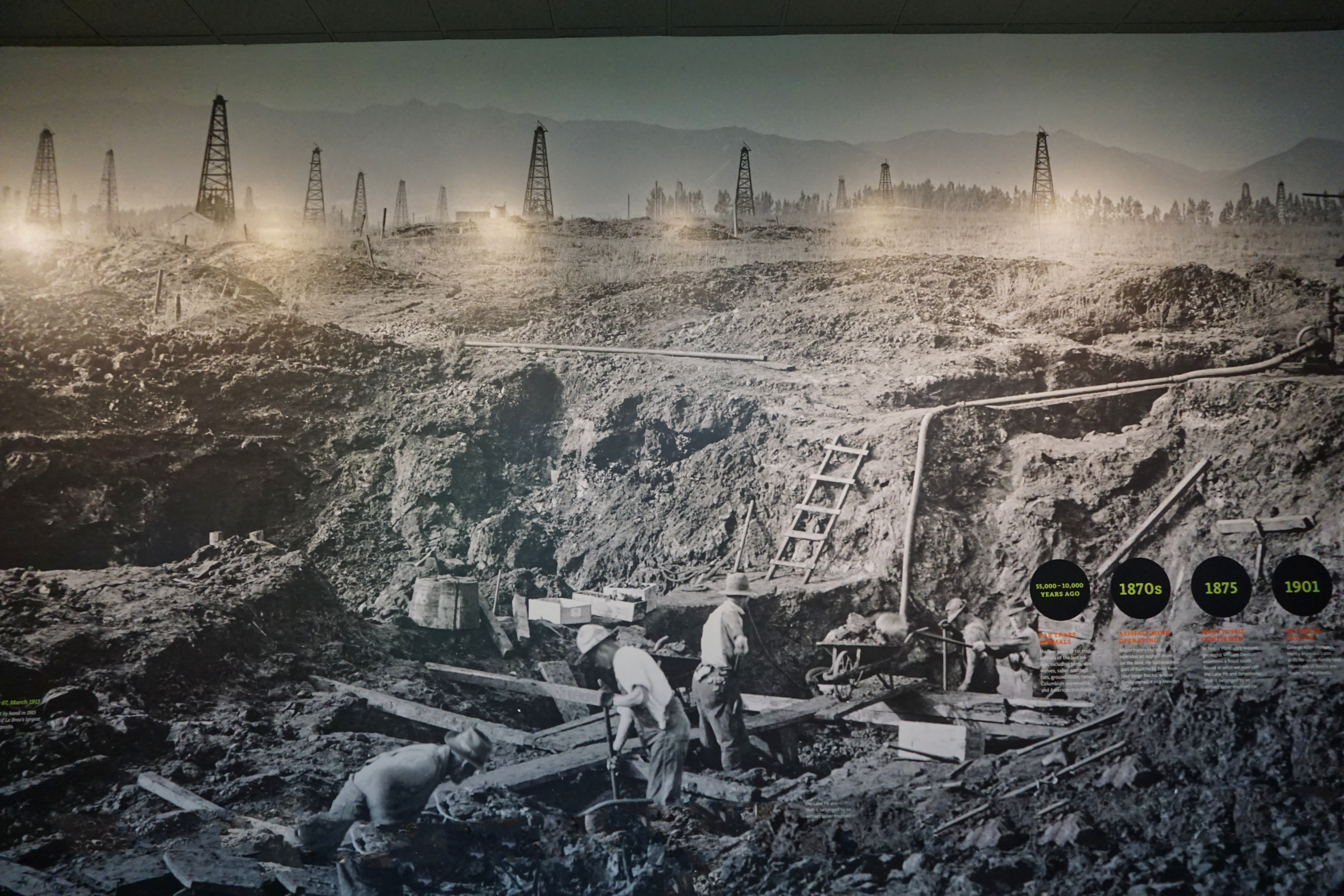
Early excavation (c. 1913 – c. 1915)

=== Excavations ===
2011 VOA report about the new discoveries in the pits

In 1901, Union Oil geologist W. W. Orcutt became the first to recognize that fossilized prehistoric animal bones were preserved in asphalt pools on the Hancock ranch. To honor his discovery, paleontologists named the La Brea coyote (Canis latrans orcutti) after him. Early in the 20th century, John C. Merriam of the University of California, Berkeley directed much of the original work at the site, leading to the start of contemporary bone excavations in 1913.

During the 1940s and 1950s, public interest was generated by the lab preparation of previously excavated large mammal bones. Subsequent analysis revealed that the fossil vertebrate material was remarkably well preserved, exhibiting minimal bacterial degradation of bone proteins. Dating places these remains at approximately 10,000 to 20,000 years old, originating from the Last Glacial Period.

On February 18, 2009, George C. Page Museum announced the 2006 discovery of 16 fossil deposits that had been removed from the ground during the construction of an underground parking garage for the Los Angeles County Museum of Art next to the tar pits. Among the finds are remains of a saber-toothed cat, dire wolves, ancient bison, western horses, a giant Harlan's ground sloth, turtles, snails, clams, millipedes, fish, gophers, and an American lion. Also discovered is a nearly intact Columbian mammoth skeleton, nicknamed Zed; the only pieces missing are a rear leg, a vertebra, and the top of its skull, which was sheared off by construction equipment in preparation to build the parking structure. These fossils were packaged in boxes at the construction site and moved to a compound behind Pit 91, on Page Museum property, so that construction could continue. Twenty-three large accumulations of tar and specimens were taken to the Page Museum. These deposits are worked on under the name "Project 23".

As work for the public transit D Line is extended, museum researchers know more tar pits will be uncovered, for example near the intersection of Wilshire and Curson. In an exploratory subway dig in 2014 on the Miracle Mile, prehistoric objects unearthed included geoducks, sand dollars, and a 10-foot limb (3.0 m) from a pine tree, of a type now found in Central California's woodlands.

== George C. Page Museum ==
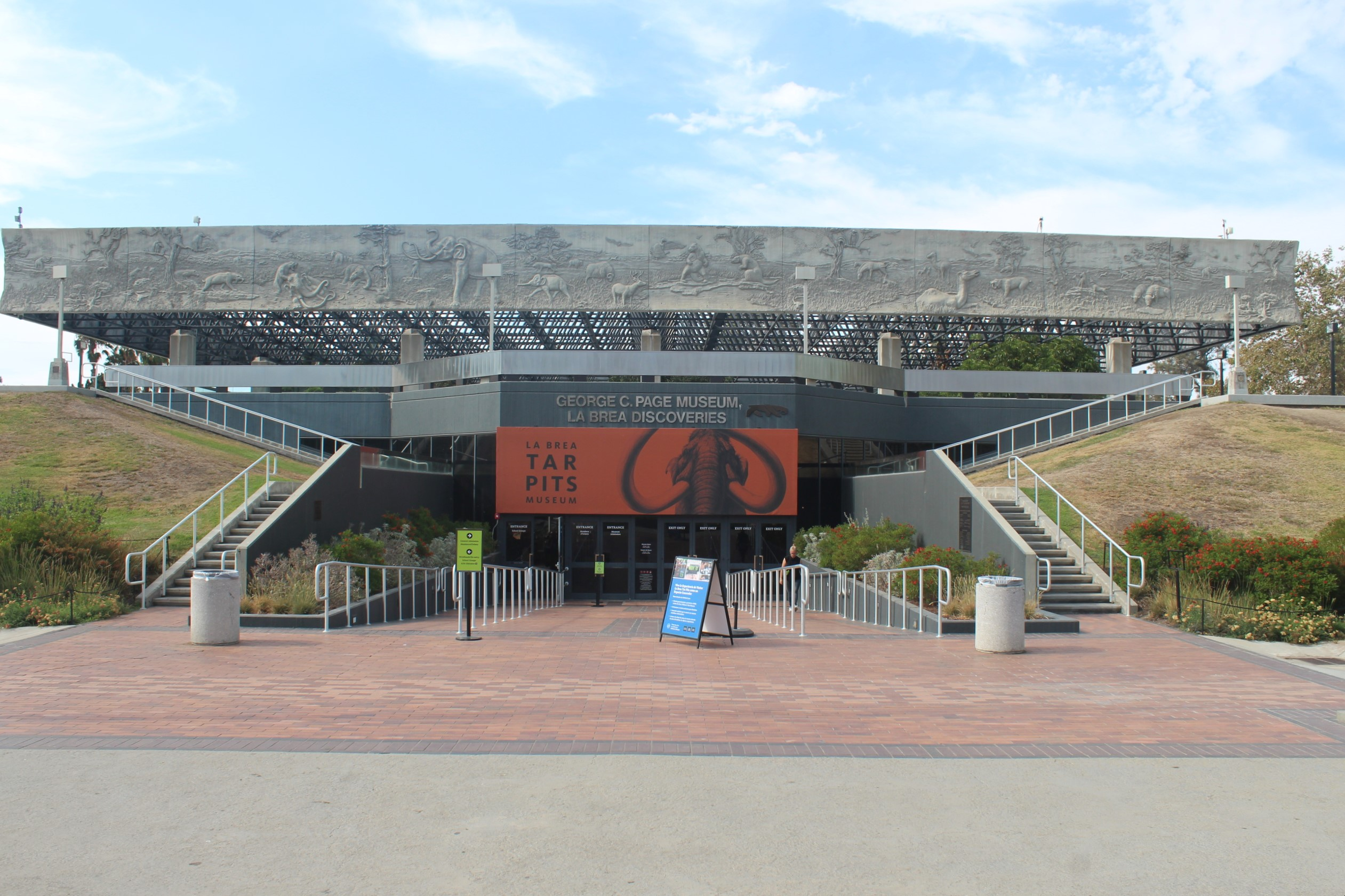
The George C. Page Museum in Hancock Park

In 1913, George Allan Hancock, the owner of Rancho La Brea, granted the Natural History Museum of Los Angeles County exclusive excavation rights at the Tar Pits for two years. In those two years, the museum was able to extract 750,000 specimens at 96 sites, guaranteeing that a large collection of fossils would remain consolidated and available to the community. Then in 1924, Hancock donated 23 acres (9.3 ha) to Los Angeles County with the stipulation that the county provide for the preservation of the park and the exhibition of fossils found there.

The George C. Page Museum of La Brea Discoveries, part of the Natural History Museum of Los Angeles County, was built next to the tar pits in Hancock Park on Wilshire Boulevard. It was named for the donor of the site. Construction began in 1975, and the museum opened to the public in 1977. The area is part of urban Los Angeles in the Miracle Mile District.

The museum tells the story of the tar pits and presents specimens excavated from them. Visitors can walk around the park and see the tar pits. On the grounds of the park are life-sized models of prehistoric animals in or near the tar pits. Of more than 100 pits, only Pit 91 is still regularly excavated by researchers and can be seen at the Pit 91 viewing station. In addition to Pit 91, the one other ongoing excavation is called "Project 23". Paleontologists supervise and direct the work of volunteers at both sites.

As a result of a design competition in 2019, the Natural History Museum of Los Angeles County chose Weiss/Manfredi over Dorte Mandrup and Diller Scofidio + Renfro to redesign the park, including by adding a pedestrian walkway framing Lake Pitt, which is 3,281 feet (1,000 metres) long.

The museum is featured prominently in the 1992 cult classic film Encino Man, where the title character recollects he was previously a caveman during his exploration of the museum's exhibits.

== Heritage site ==
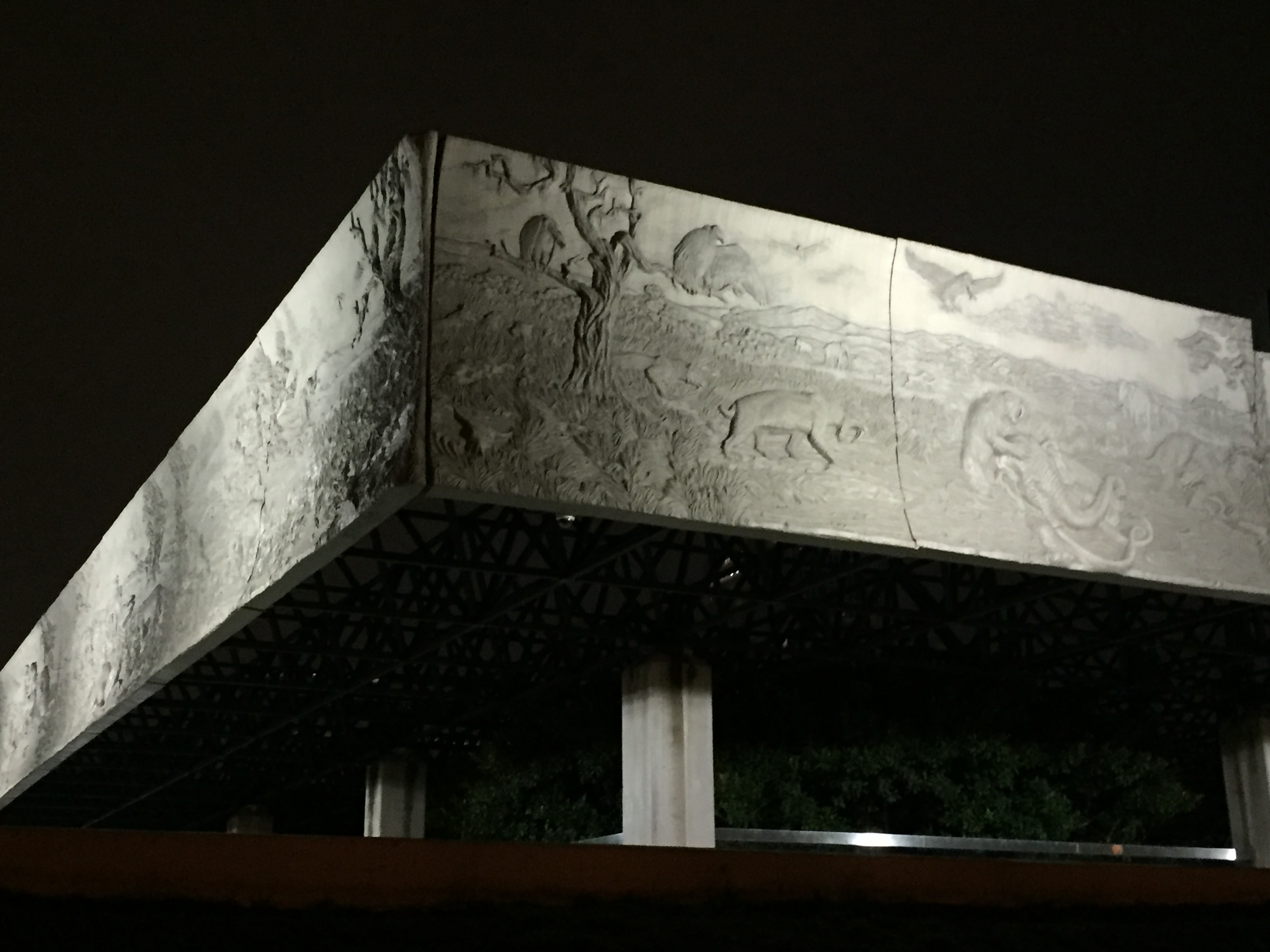
The George C. Page Museum at night.

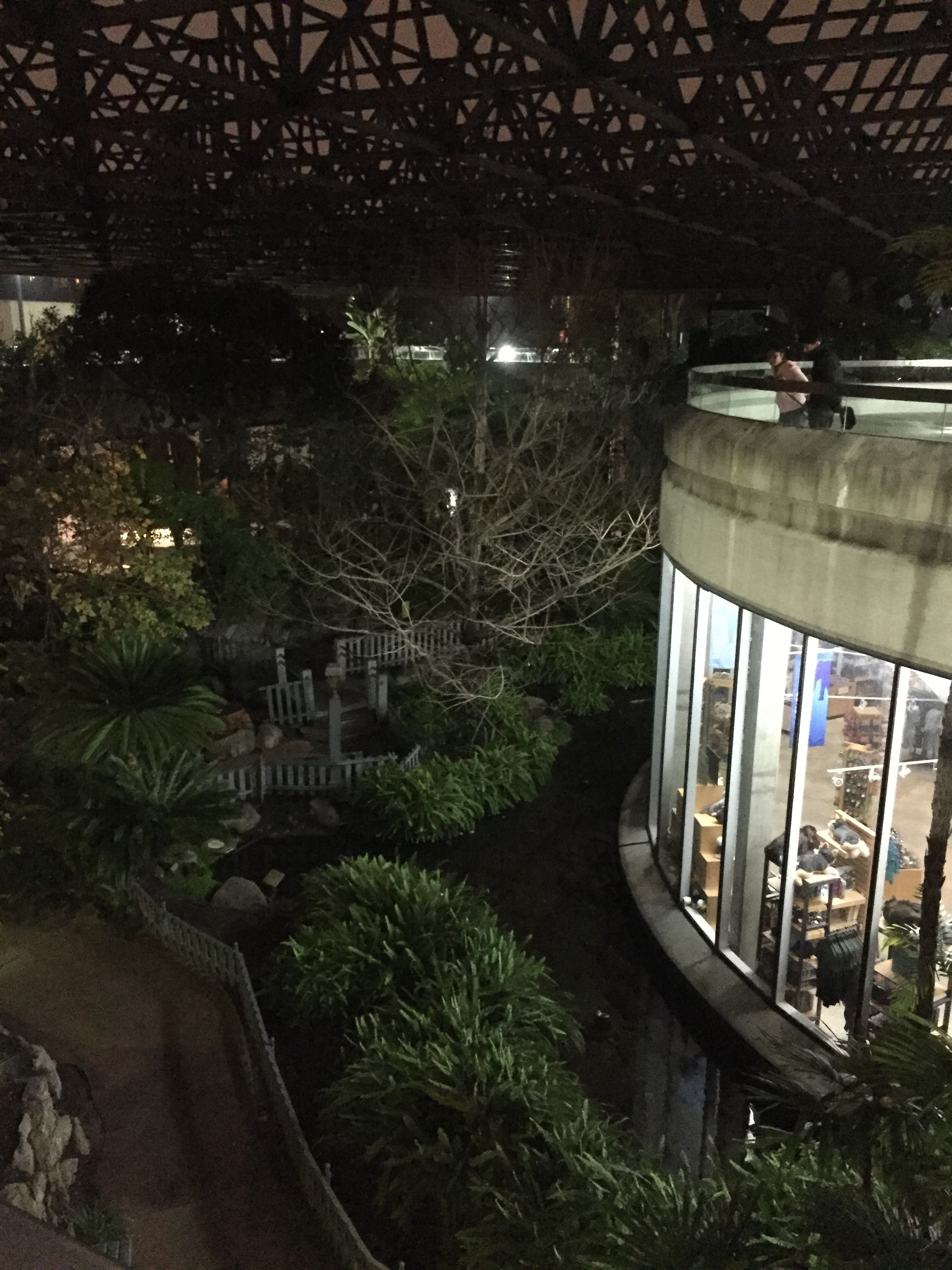
The George C. Page Museum at night.

In respect of it being the "richest paleontological site on Earth for terrestrial fossils of late Quaternary age," the International Union of Geological Sciences (IUGS) included the "Late Quaternary asphalt seeps and paleontological site of La Brea Tar Pits" in its assemblage of 100 geological heritage sites around the world in a listing published in October 2022. The organization defines an IUGS Geological Heritage Site as "a key place with geological elements and/or processes of international scientific relevance, used as a reference, and/or with a substantial contribution to the development of geological sciences through history."

== Flora and fauna ==
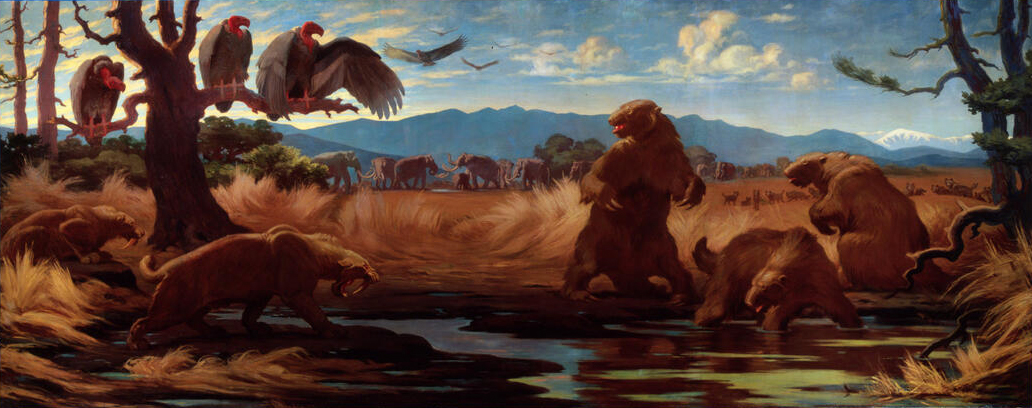
La Brea Tar Pits fauna as depicted by Charles R. Knight

Among the prehistoric Pleistocene species associated with the La Brea Tar Pits are Columbian mammoths, dire wolves, short-faced bears, American lions, ground sloths (predominantly Paramylodon harlani, with much rarer Megalonyx jeffersonii and Nothrotheriops shastensis) and the state fossil of California, the saber-toothed cat (Smilodon fatalis). The tar pits don't contain non-bird dinosaur remains, as these were extinct before the pits formed.

The park is known for producing myriad mammal fossils dating from the Wisconsin glaciation. While mammal fossils generate significant interest, other fossils including fossilized insects and plants, and even pollen grains, are also valued. These fossils help define a picture of what is thought to have been a cooler, moister climate in the Los Angeles basin during the glacial age. Microfossils are retrieved from the matrix of asphalt and sandy clay by washing with a solvent to remove the petroleum, then picking through the remains under a high-powered lens.

Historically, the majority of the mammals excavated from the La Brea deposits had been large carnivores, supporting a hypothesized "carnivore trap" in which large herbivores entrapped in asphalt attracted predators and scavengers which then became entrapped while trying to steal a quick meal. However, new research with an eye towards microfossils has revealed a stunning diversity and abundance of many types of mammals.

=== Bacteria ===
Methane gas escapes from the tar pits, causing bubbles that make the asphalt appear to boil. Asphalt and methane appear under surrounding buildings and require special operations for removal to prevent the weakening of building foundations. In 2007, researchers from UC Riverside discovered that the bubbles were caused by hardy forms of bacteria embedded in the natural asphalt. After consuming petroleum, the bacteria release methane. Around 200 to 300 species of bacteria were newly discovered here.

== Human presence ==
Only a single human specimen has been recovered from the site, the partial skeletal remains of La Brea Woman, dated to approximately 10,000 calendar years (about 9,000 radiocarbon years) BP. Analysis indicates she was between 18 and 25 years old at the time of her death. Although she was originally interpreted as having been ceremonially interred due to her close association with the remains of a domestic dog, subsequent dating conducted in 2016 determined that the dog remains were significantly more recent.

Also, some even older fossils showed possible tool marks, indicating humans active in the area at the time. Bones of saber-toothed cats from La Brea showing signs of "artificial" cut marks at oblique angles to the long axis of each bone were radiocarbon dated to 15,200 ± 800 BP (uncalibrated). If these cuts are in fact tool marks resultant from butchering activities, then this material would provide the earliest solid evidence for human association with the Los Angeles Basin. Yet it is also possible that there was some residual contamination of the material as a result of saturation by asphaltum, influencing the radiocarbon dates.

== Gallery ==
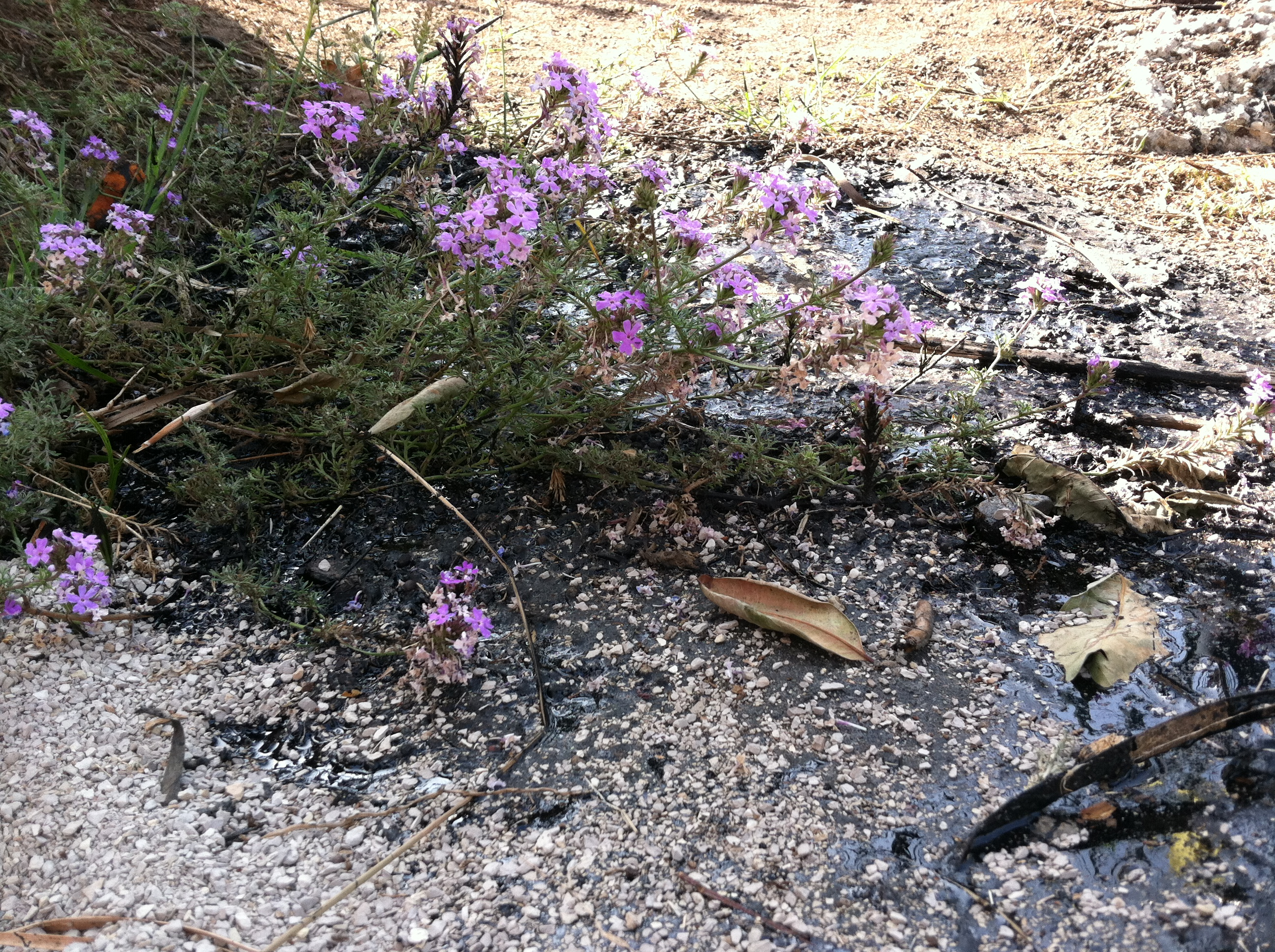
Tar and wild flower run within La Brea campus (2014)

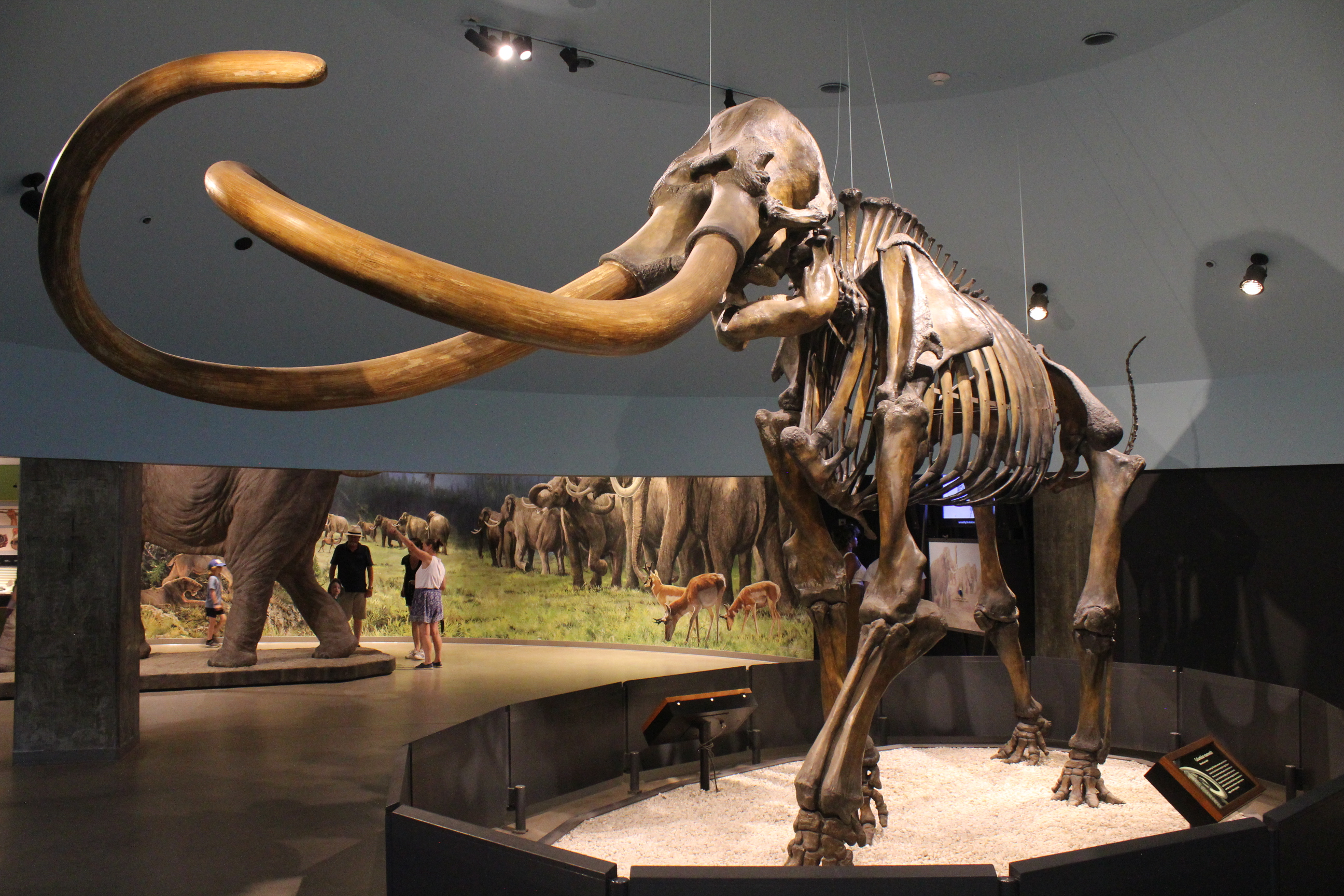
Skeleton of a Columbian mammoth from the tar pits, displayed in the George C. Page Museum

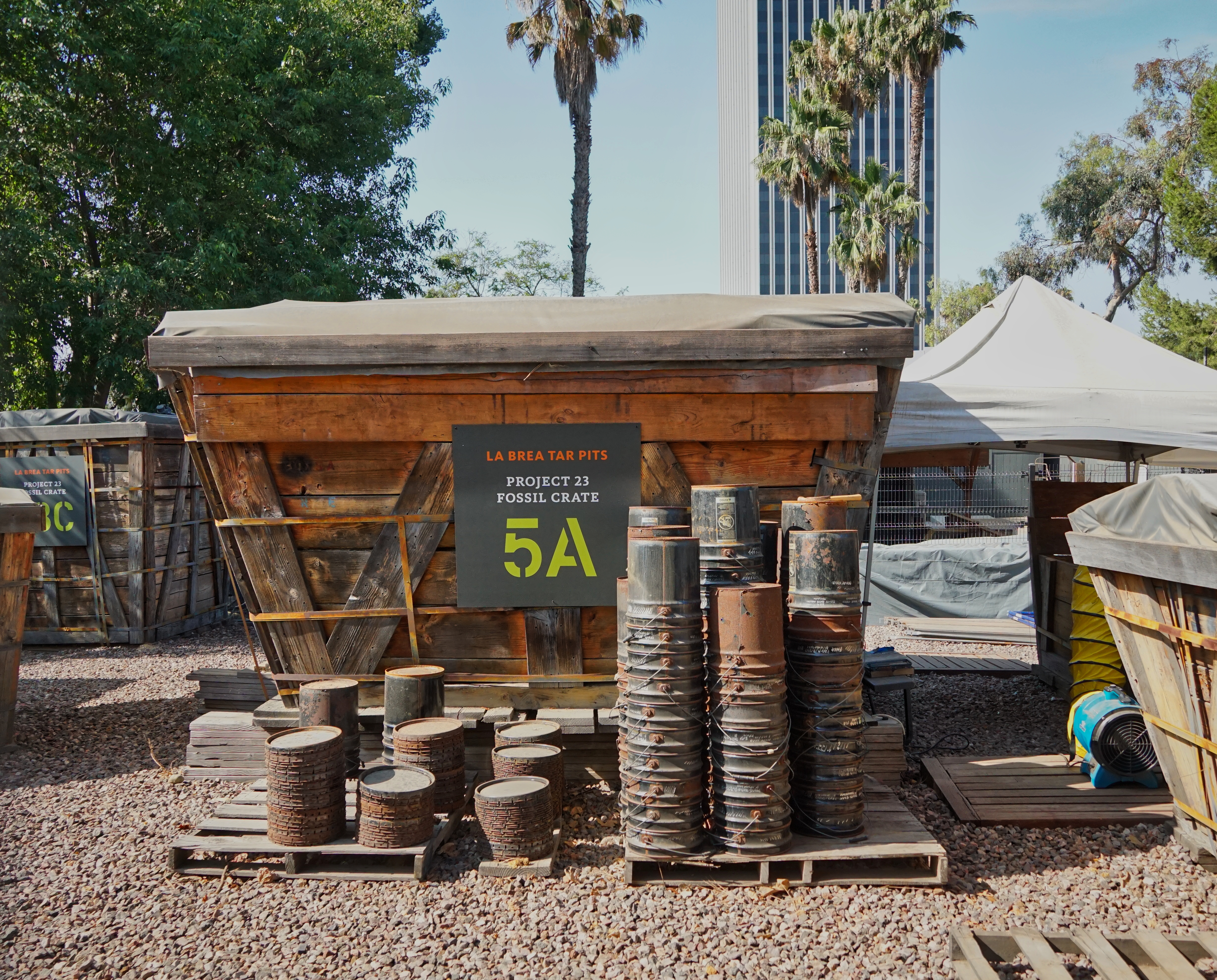
Fossil crate (2021)

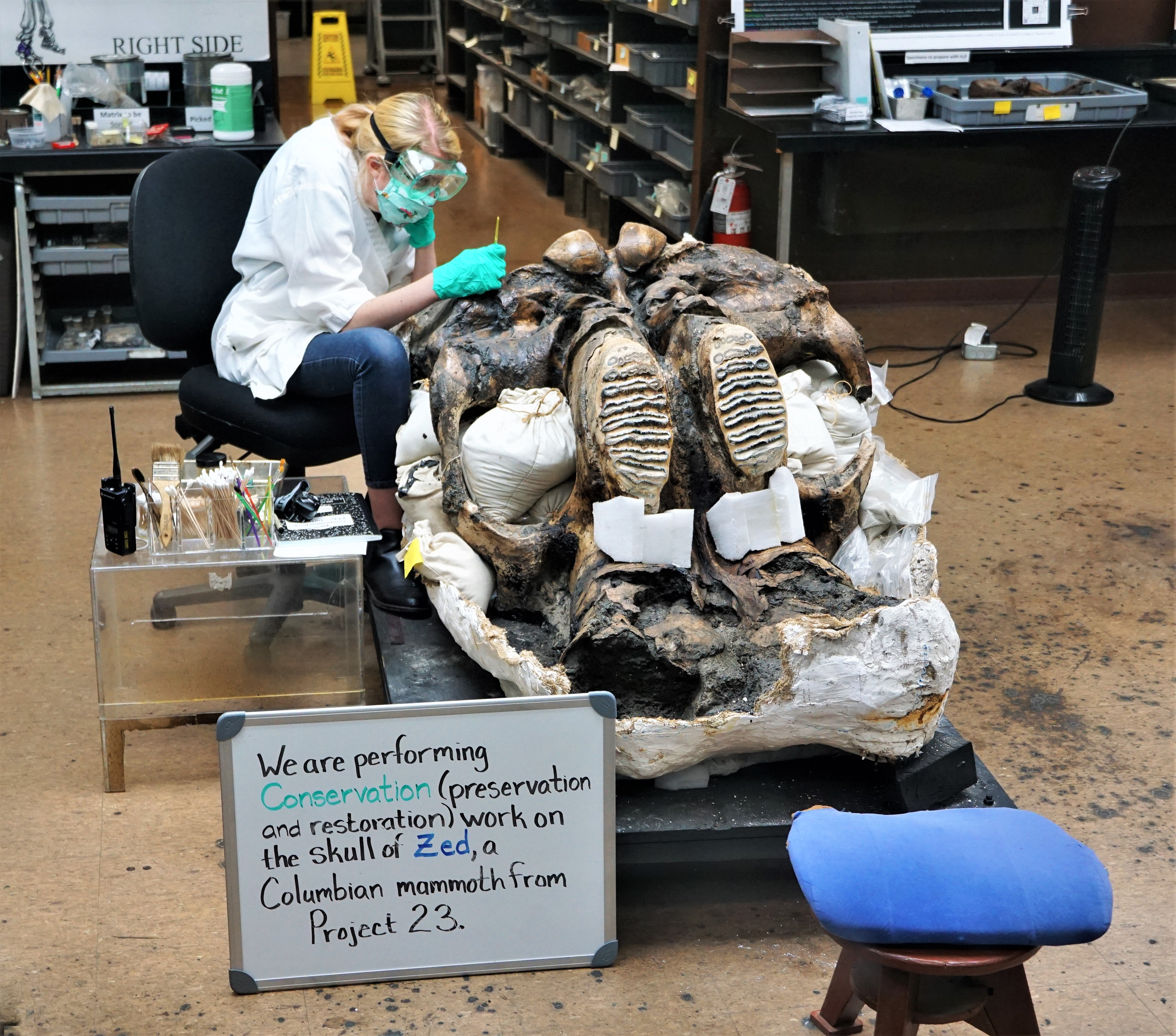
Lab technician working on recent specimen ZED (2021)

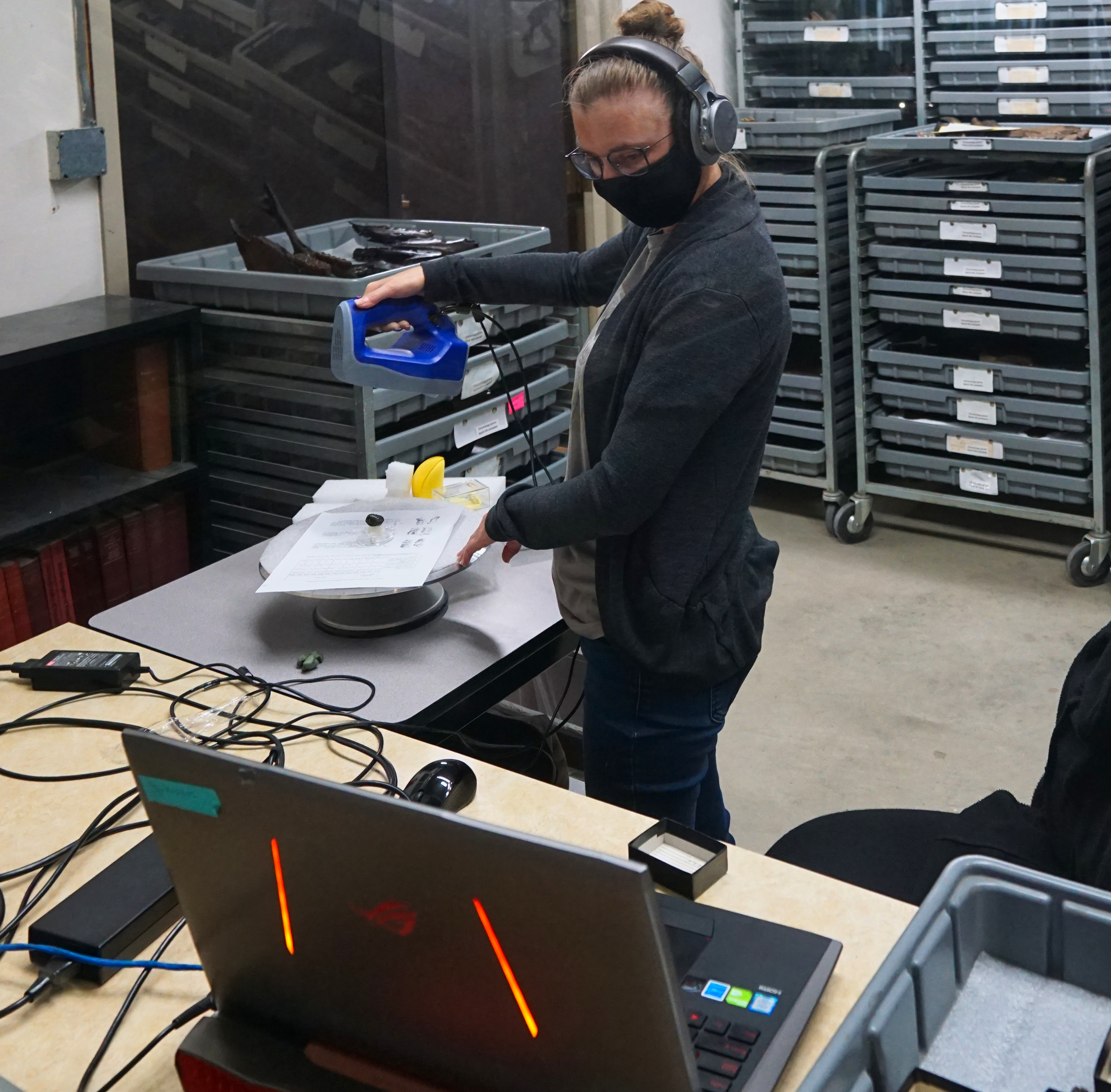
Lab technician doing a 3-D scan of a fossil (2021)

== See also ==
- Binagadi asphalt lake
- Carpinteria Tar Pits
- Lagerstätten
- Lake Bermudez
- List of fossil sites
- Los Angeles County Museum of Art
- McKittrick Tar Pits
- Pitch Lake
- Volcano, disaster film involving a volcano that forms from the La Brea Tar Pits.
