= Natural History Museum of Los Angeles County =

Natural history museum in California

The Natural History Museum of Los Angeles County
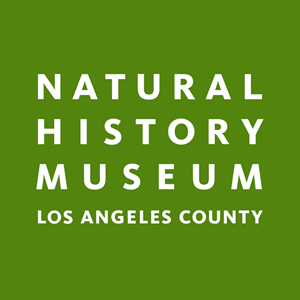

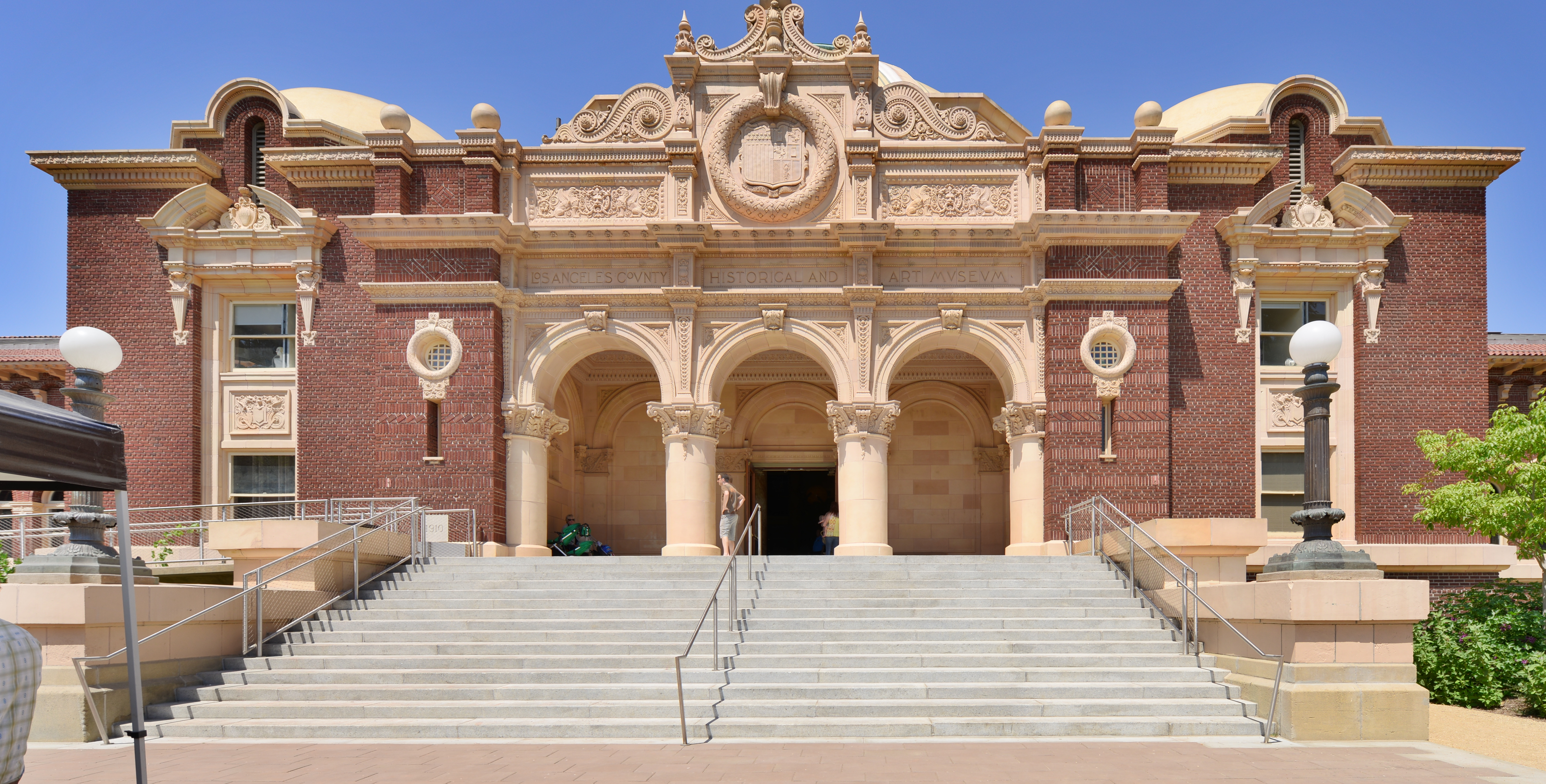
- The east entrance and façade
- Established: 1913
- Location: Exposition Park; Los Angeles, California
- Coordinates: 34°1′1″N 118°17′16″W
- Type: Natural history museum
- Visitors: about 1 million annually
- Director: Lori Bettison-Varga
- Public transit access: Expo Park/USC, Expo/Vermont
- Website: nhm.org
- Natural History Museum
- U.S. National Register of Historic Places
- Location within the Los Angeles metropolitan area Location within California Location within the United States
- Location: 900 Exposition Blvd; Los Angeles, California
- Area: 6 acres (2.4 ha)
- Built: 1913
- Architect: Hudson & Munsell
- Architectural style: Beaux-Arts; Neoclassical; Romanesque; Plateresque
- NRHP reference No.: 75000434
- Added to NRHP: March 4, 1975

The Natural History Museum of Los Angeles County is a museum located in Exposition Park in Los Angeles, next to the California Science Center. It is the largest natural and historical museum in the Western United States, with a collection of nearly 35 million specimens and artifacts covering 4.5 billion years of history, it is also home to the rarest gemstone in the world, Kyawthuite. This large collection consists of not only specimens for exhibition but also vast research collections housed on and offsite.

The museum is associated with one other museum in Greater Los Angeles: the Page Museum at the La Brea Tar Pits in Hancock Park. The two museums work together to achieve their common mission: "to inspire wonder, discovery, and responsibility for our natural and cultural worlds".

== History ==
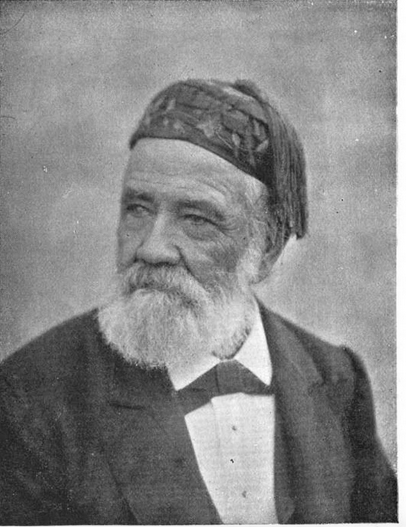
Antonio F. Coronel (pictured) and his wife, Mariana, who collected items with Mexican and Native American affinities, were early contributors to the museum's collection.

The concept for what would become the Natural History Museum of Los Angeles County started with William Miller Bowen in the 1890s. Bowen, an attorney and Sunday school teacher, sought to convert Agricultural Park in Los Angeles from a place of perceived vice (including saloons and gambling events) to a cultural center. He proposed a tripartite system where the state of California and Los Angeles County would construct each construct buildings and the City of Los Angeles would be responsible for maintenance. Ground was broken for a historical and arts museum on July 11, 1910. Bowen, who spoke briefly at the ceremony, was reported to be extremely satisfied with the realization of his years-long plans. A contemporary Los Angeles Herald article credited a Mrs. Housh as an "equally zealous" contributor; it was she who broke the ground after Bowen's daughter, Louise, handed her the spade. Another one of Bowen's daughters, Mary, ceremonially renamed Agricultural Park to Exposition Park on December 17, 1910, during the cornerstone-laying for the museum. The stone was laid by the Freemason leader Dana R. Weller, Grand Master of the Grand Lodge of California.

The Los Angeles County Museum of History, Science, and Art opened to the public on November 6, 1913. The opening address was delivered by District Attorney John D. Fredericks. Over 1,000 people were present at Exposition Park for the opening reception, which coincided with the close of a two-day-long celebration of the opening of the Los Angeles Aqueduct. A Los Angeles Herald article describing the event reported that the art gallery was the "center of attraction", featuring works by artists including Raphael and Anthony van Dyck. Among the art on display was a portrait of William Mulholland, the builder of the Los Angeles Aqueduct, by Esther Hunt. The original board of governors of the museum consisted of William Miller Bowen, Dr. George F. Bovard, R. W. Pridham, Arthur Burnett Benton, Howard Robertson, Dr. Anstruther Davidson, and Alfred Rosenheim. The directors predicted that with future increased interest from collectors and other supporters, the museum could grow its collection a thousandfold.

The Los Angeles County Museum took part in the hosting of the 1932 Summer Olympics, which were held in the city. The events included artistic competitions (a feature of the Olympic Games between 1912 and 1948), and over 1,100 artworks by artists from thirty-one countries were held in the museum. They included paintings, prints, architectural designs, drawings, sculptures, and decorative artworks. Leila Mechlin, secretary of the American Federation of Arts, was in charge of their exhibition. Los Angeles County spent a total of $1,500,000 (equivalent to $35,396,341 in 2025) on remodeling in preparation for the Games, for which roughly 30 acres (120,000 m^{2}) of floor space was made available. Later that year, the International Olympic Committee offered the Los Angeles County Board of Supervisors a gift of Olympic flags, medals, and other memorabilia to be used for a permanent exhibit in the museum. They accepted the offer within a few days.

According to the art historian and writer Dore Ashton, the lack of a dedicated art museum in Los Angeles was a significant frustration to contemporary art enthusiasts in the city by 1956. She summarized the collection of the Los Angeles County Museum as "minerals, dinosaurs and butterflies in addition to some splendid but sadly housed works of art" and wrote that museum officials struggled to balance classical and contemporary tastes. She praised the work of Richard Fargo Brown in expanding the museum's collection of contemporary art and broadening its services. Brown had been hired in 1954 as the Los Angeles County Museum's chief curator of art, leaving his position at the Frick Collection to assume the role. He worked with the philanthropist and art collector Norton Simon to develop a separate art museum. The Los Angeles County Museum of Art was established in Hancock Park in 1963, with Brown as its first director. Brown later resigned in 1965 after a dispute with the new museum's board of trustees. He was posthumously credited by the arts journalist Grace Glueck for establishing two major American museums (the Los Angeles County Museum of Art and the Kimbell Art Museum) "virtually from the ground up". Following the 1963 split, the original facility of the Los Angeles County Museum of History, Science, and Art became known as the Natural History Museum of Los Angeles County.

In 1975, construction began for a separate museum at the site of La Brea Tar Pits, specimens from which had historically been housed at the Natural History Museum. The project was financed by the philanthropist George C. Page. Page had visited La Brea Tar Pits in 1917 and was disappointed by how far the Natural History Museum, which held the skeletons he wished to see, was from the tar pits themselves. The George C. Page Museum of La Brea Discoveries opened in 1977. Tom R. Hennion of the Tulare Advance Register, who favorably reviewed the Page Museum shortly following its opening, wrote that it complemented the older Natural History Museum. The two museums together comprise the Natural History Museums of Los Angeles County.

In 2009, the 1913 Building, from which the Natural History Museum had gradually expanded outward since its establishment, reopened following two years of renovation. Many of the building's original features, including a stained glass skylight, were restored, while other changes were made to modernize it. The project included a seismic retrofit. The restored building held its first exhibition, Age of Mammals, in 2010. President and Director Jane Pisano described the exhibition's opening as a "coming-out party" which came alongside internal discussion over the role of a natural history museum for the local community. The restored exhibition hall was given a skylight and new windows, while older windows were uncovered. Suzanne Muchnic, writing for the Los Angeles Times, described the result as "airy" and "light-filled". Age of Mammals spans over 65 million years, ending with a warning of modern climate change.

Two additional exhibitions were added to the renovated 1913 Building: the Dinosaur Hall in 2011 and Becoming Los Angeles in 2013. Edward Rothstein of The New York Times found the Dinosaur Hall effective in emphasizing the contributions of paleontologists to scientific understanding of the prehistoric world, but described Becoming Los Angeles as "thin" and deficient in context and explanation. July 2013 marked the end of the Natural History Museum's renovations, which cost $135 million. Besides the three exhibitions, additions included a new entrance featuring a six-story-high glass pavilion with a hanging 63-foot-long (19 m) fin whale skeleton and a 3.5-acre (14,000 m^{2}) urban wilderness featuring 31,000 plantings and a 27,000-US-gallon (100,000 L) pond.

In 2024, the Natural History Museum completed a $75 million expansion, NHM Commons. The addition is free to the public, exempt from the museum's regular admission fee. The ground floor contains a cafe, a theater, and a public restroom, while the floor above it features a mounted sauropod skeleton and a mural showing the history of Los Angeles. The architecture writer Shane Reiner-Roth wrote in The Architect's Newspaper that the expansion, which he described as "less hungry for attention" than other structures in Exposition Park, added a "crucial" fourth entrance to the museum.

== Research and collections ==
The museum maintains research and collections in the following fields:

- Annelida
- Anthropology and Archaeology
- Crustacea
- Echinoderms
- Entomology
- Ethnology
- Herpetology
- History
- Ichthyology
- Invertebrate paleontology
- Malacology
- Mammalogy
- Mineralogy
- Ornithology
- Vertebrate paleontology

The museum has three floors of permanent exhibits. Among the most popular museum displays are those devoted to animal habitats, dinosaurs, pre-Columbian cultures, The Ralph M. Parsons Discovery Center and Insect Zoo, and the new Nature Lab, which explores urban wildlife in Southern California.

The museum's collections are strong in many fields, but the mineralogy and Pleistocene paleontology are the most esteemed, the latter thanks to the wealth of specimens collected from The La Brea Tar Pits.

The museum has almost 30 million specimens representing marine zoology. These include one of the largest collections of marine mammal remains in the world, housed in a warehouse off site, which at over 5,000 specimens is second in size only to that of The Smithsonian.

The museum's collection of historical documents is held in The Seaver Center for Western History Research.

== Special exhibits ==
The museum hosts regular special exhibitions which augment its collections and advance its mission. Recent special exhibits have included Mummies and Pterosaurs, both in 2016. The museum has also recently hosted exhibits that incorporate pop culture, such as an exhibit promoting House of the Dragon in 2022. There have also been Los Angeles themed special exhibits such as a Becoming Los Angeles that showcases Los Angeles history through the years, divided up into before 1929 and after 1929. Another example would be the current exhibit titled L.A. Underwater which exhibits almost 40 fossils from the prehistoric time, when the land where L.A. now is, was underwater.

The museum also hosts a butterfly pavilion outside every spring and summer and a spider pavilion on the same site in the fall.

Since 2017, the museum has hosted a special exhibit about P-22, the mountain lion that lived in nearby Griffith Park.

== Architecture ==
Over the years, the museum has built additions onto its original building. Originally dedicated when The Natural History Museum opened in 1913, the rotunda is one of the museum's most elegant and popular spaces. Lined with marble columns and crowned by a stained glass dome, the room is also the home of the very first piece of public art funded by Los Angeles County, a Beaux-Arts statue by Julia Bracken Wendt entitled Three Muses, or History, Science and Art.

== Film and television ==
- In 1996, Sheryl Crow filmed her "If It Makes You Happy" music video in the museum's Endangered Species Hall.
- Honda filmed its "Matthew Broderick's Day Off" commercial at the museum.
- The twenty-seventh season of The Bachelor was shot one of the dates inside the museum.
- In 2025, Machine Gun Kelly filmed his music video for his song "vampire diaries" at the museum.

== Gallery ==
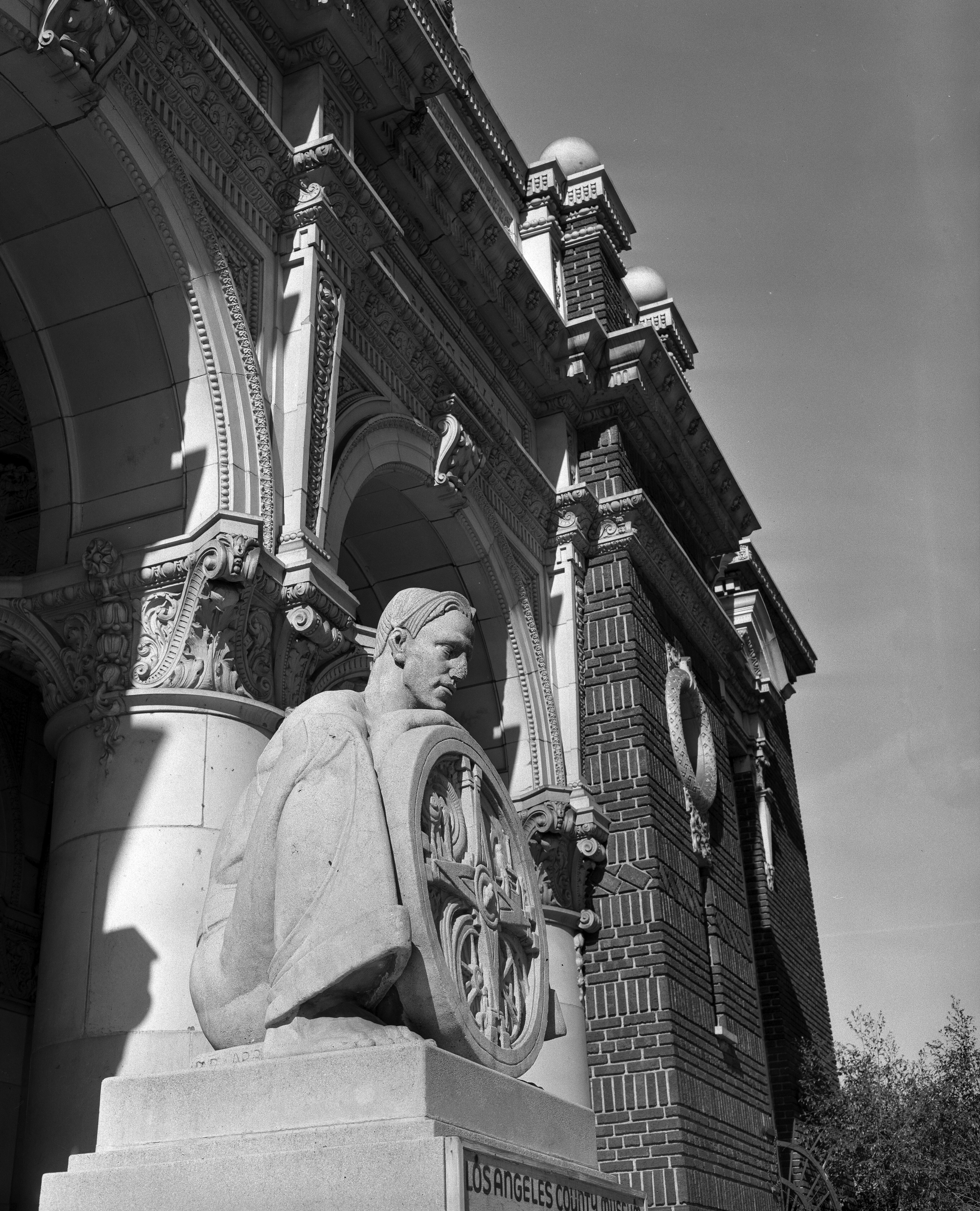
Old east door of The Natural History Museum in 1956

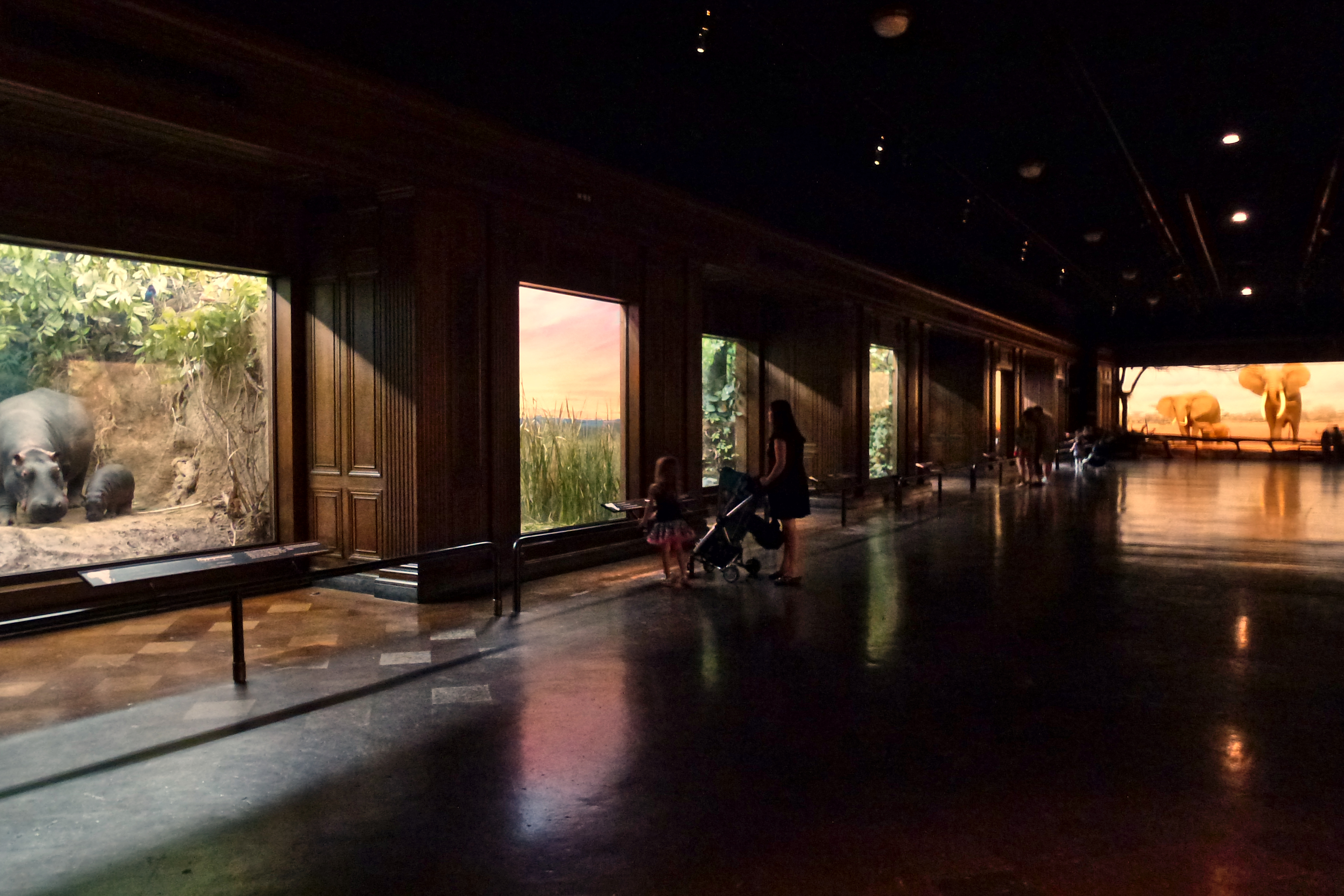
Hall of African Mammals

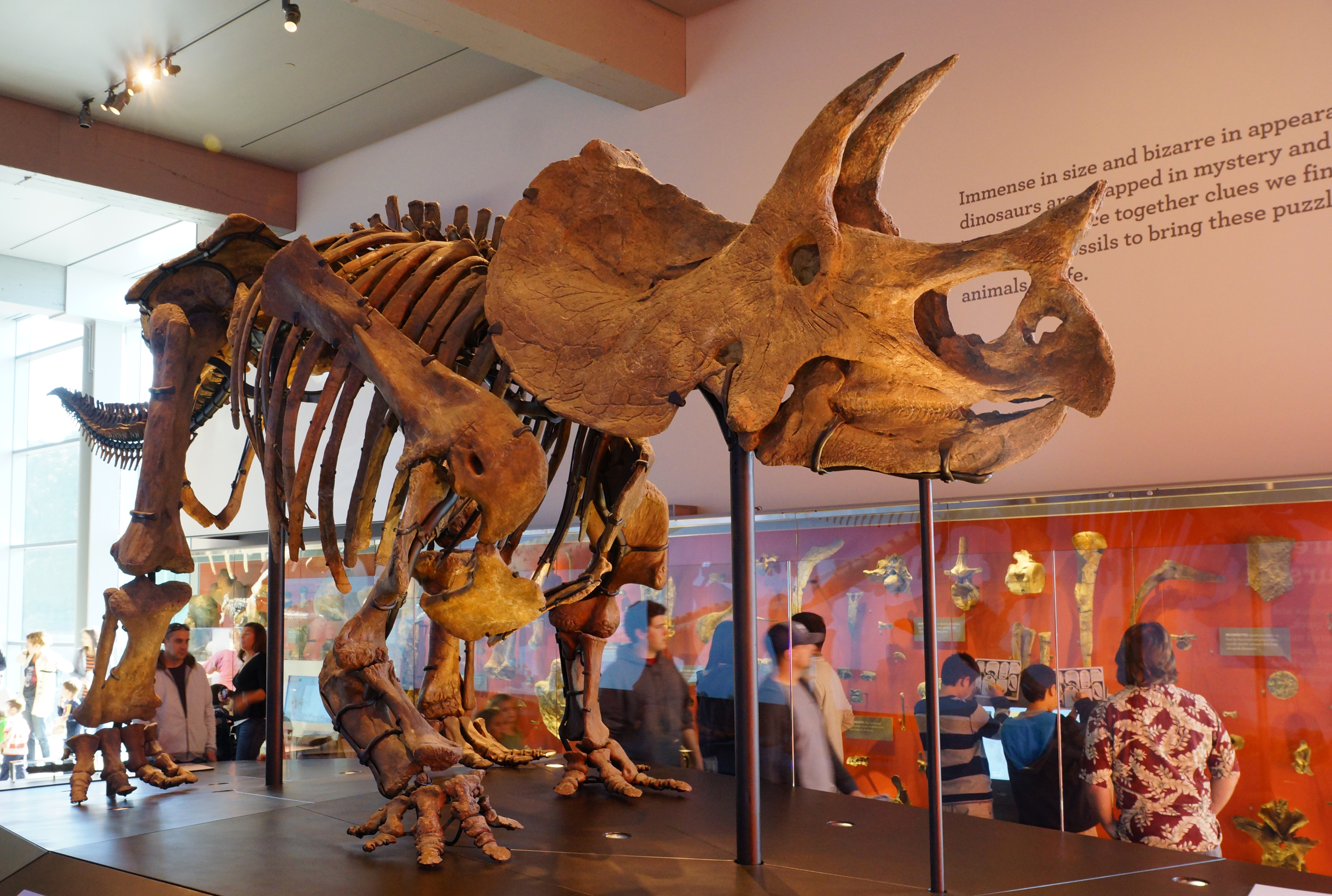
Triceratops mount in the Natural History Museum of Los Angeles County

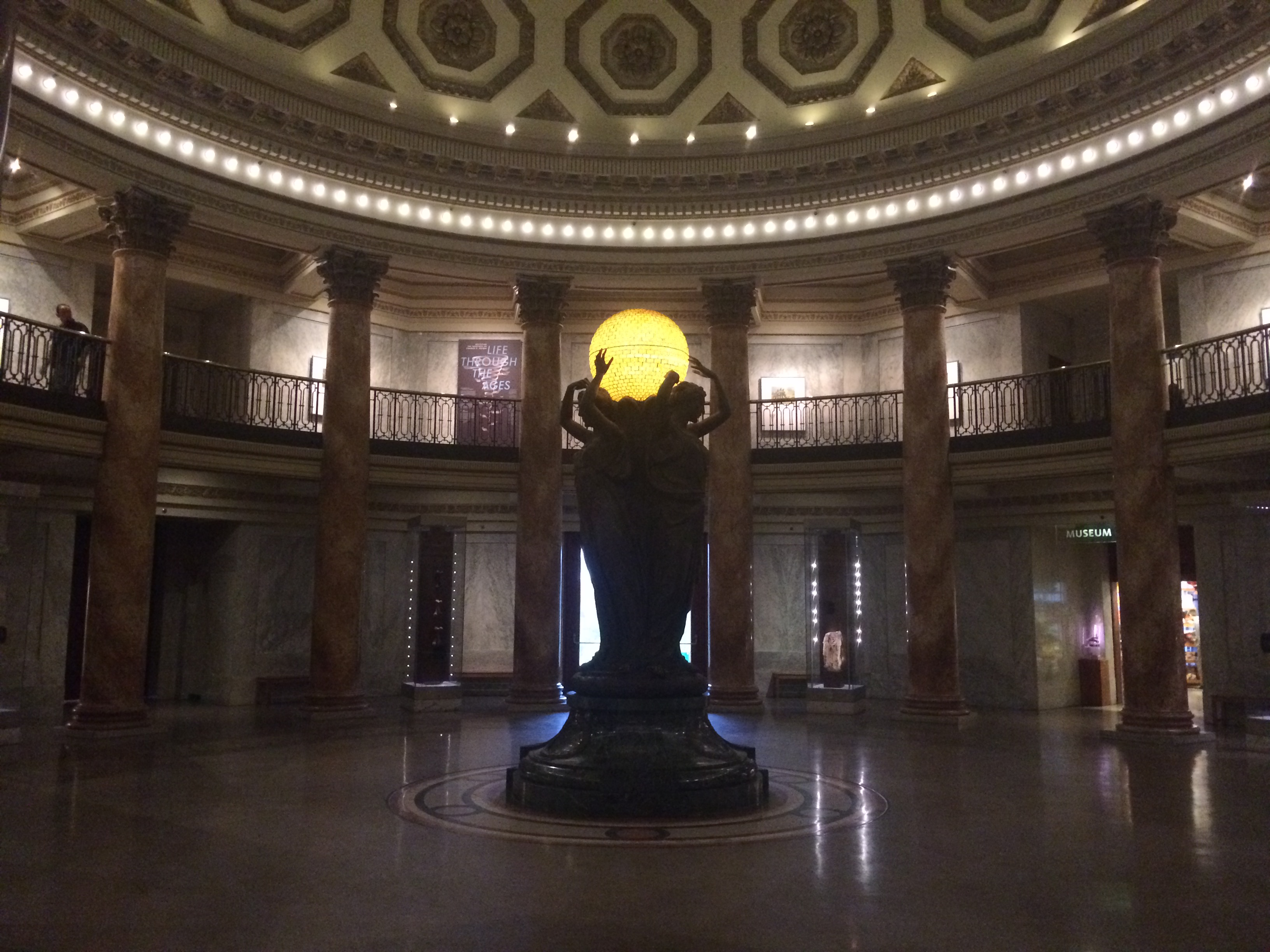
Museum rotunda

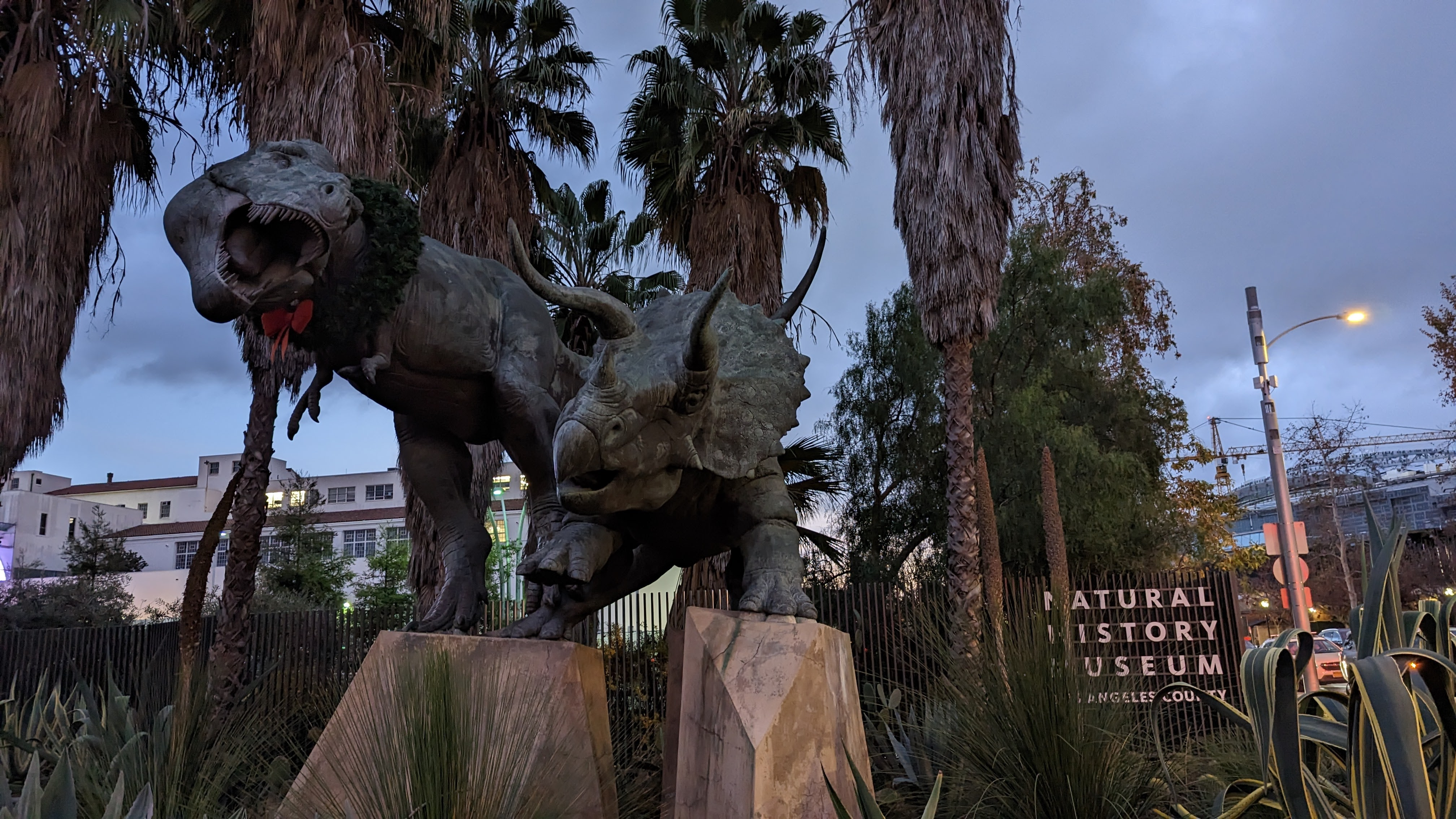
Dinosaur statues along the road leading to the museum
