= Caroline Mastin Welsh =

American museum professional and author

- Education: Wellesley College
- Occupation: Museum professional
- Organization: Adirondack Museum
- Title: Director Emerita of the Adirondack Museum

Caroline Mastin Welsh is an American museum professional and author. She has been in the museum profession since the late 1960s, and has worked for the Smithsonian Institution and the Albany Institute of History and Art. She also served as the director of the Adirondack Museum, which houses an extensive collection on the Adirondacks. She is now the Director Emerita of the Adirondack Museum. She is published widely on the subject of Adirondacks.

== Early life and education ==
Welsh graduated from Wellesley College in 1970. She completed fellowships in museum studies at the Smithsonian Institution and in museum leadership at the Getty Leadership Institute.
