= Brigid Globensky =

- Occupations: Museum Director of Education and Programs
- Notable work: Museum Educator of the Year by the National Art Education Association (2013); J. Paul Getty Museum Scholar (2013)

Brigid Globensky is the Senior Director of Education and Programs at the Milwaukee Art Museum, the largest art museum in Wisconsin. She previously acted as the Director of Education and Community Programs at the Baltimore Museum of Art. She is a museum educator.

== Education ==
Globensky attended Trinity College between 1973 - 1977 and received her B.A. in History and a focus in Art History. In 1993, she subsequently earned a MS.Ed. in Museum Education at Bank Street College of Education. In 1999, she graduated with a PhD in American Studies from the University of Maryland, College Park after defending her dissertation on the expression and reassertion of Lumbee cultural identity through mass-produced interior decorations.

Further, she holds a certificate in Photography from the Maryland Institute, College of Art since 1989.

== Career ==
After eight years of working as a community house organizer, Globensky began her museum education career at the Baltimore Museum of Art in 1987 as Coordinator of Gallery Interpretation, training and supervising the volunteer docent corps. After two years, she became the assistant director of Education and Community at the Baltimore Museum of Art. She oversaw the volunteer unit as well as the institution's summer internship program. Following a promotion in 1996, she acted as the Director of Education and Community. In 2001, Globensky joined the Milwaukee Art Museum where she is Senior Director of Education and Programs and manages the educational programs for various audiences and educators, including docents and volunteers. Further, her position supports the planning of exhibitions and curating the education gallery. She oversees the Kohl's Art Generation Program Grant and organized several exhibitions such as Animation: Art Goes to the Movies. During her tenure, she was named Museum Educator of the Year by the National Art Education Association.

== Publications ==
- Globensky, Anne Brigid. 1999. At home in Baltimore: an ethnographic approach to the study of Lumbee domestic material culture.
- Globensky, Brigid. 2019. “A Forgotten History: Children’s Space in US Art Museums throughout the Twentieth Century.” The International Journal of the Inclusive Museum 12 (2): 47–60. https://doi.org/10.18848/1835-2014/CGP/v12i02/47-60.

== Awards ==
- 2013: Museum Educator of the Year by the National Art Education Association
- 2013: J. Paul Getty Museum Scholar
- 2000: Fulbright Graduate Student Fellow
- 1999: Museum Education Art Educator of the Year, Eastern Region, National Art Education Association
- 1997: Museum Management Institute Fellow, J. Paul Getty Trust (now Getty Leadership Institute)
- 1992: Artist-in-Residence, Maryland State Arts Council
