= Florence Nightingale Levy =

American arts administrator

- Born: August 13, 1870; New York, New York
- Died: November 15, 1947 (aged 77); New York, New York
- Known for: Art History, Arts Administration

Florence Nightingale Levy (August 13, 1870 – November 15, 1947) was an American arts administrator notable for founding of the publication American Art Annual in 1898.

== Biography ==
Florence Nightingale Levy was daughter to Joseph Arthur Levy and Pauline (Goodheim) Levy. She received a private school education during her childhood and adolescence, and she eventually enrolled in New York's National Academy of Design to study painting. However, she found herself drawn toward art history, prompting her to later change disciplines. Between 1894 and 1895 Levy studied Italian masters at École du Louvre under Gaston Lafenestre, who was then curator of paintings at the museum. She also studied at Columbia University with John La Farge and John C. Van Dyke. In 1894, she founded American Art Annual magazine, serving as its editor until 1918. In 1901, she catalogued the art exhibition of the Pan-American Exposition. In 1909, she was one of the founders of the American Federation of Arts, and one of two female members in the male-dominated organization. From 1909 to1917, she was a staff curator at the Metropolitan Museum of Art in New York. From 1922 to 1926, she was part-time director of the Baltimore Museum of Art. Levy was also general manager of the Art Alliance of America (1917–19), executive secretary of the Arts Council of New York City (1927–32), and executive secretary of the American Fine Arts Society (1941). Her notes are used as a source for the Benezit Dictionary of Artists, often being quoted as Florence N. Levy.

== Publications ==
- Art In New York
- Exhibition of War Portraits
- A Guide to the Works of Art in New York City

== Sources ==
- Florence Nightingale Levy Papers,1899-1946 New-York Historical Society
