= Elodie Courter Osborn =

American museum curator (1911–1994)

Elodie Osborn
- Born: Elodie Courter; 1911; Brooklyn, New York, U.S.
- Died: January 20, 1994 (aged 82–83)
- Education: Wellesley College (BA)
- Occupations: Museum curator, exhibition organizer
- Years active: 1933–1979
- Known for: Director of Circulating Exhibitions at Museum of Modern Art

Elodie (Courter) Osborn (1911 – January 20, 1994) professionalized traveling exhibitions through her work at the Museum of Modern Art (1933–1947) as well as her involvement with UNESCO (1954) and the American Federation of Arts (1940s–50s).

== Early life and education ==
Osborn was born in Brooklyn in 1911. She received a B.A. in art history from Wellesley College in 1933.

== Career ==
=== Museum of Modern Art ===
In 1933 Osborn joined MoMA's newly founded Department of Circulating Exhibitions as a volunteer. She became the program secretary in 1935 and was named Director in 1939, a position she held to 1947.

Osborn almost single-handedly developed the program's domestic agenda and was involved in all its aspects, from overall direction to budget to curatorial negotiations to copy editing. Between 1932 and the apex of the program in 1954, MoMA circulated 461 exhibitions among 3,700 venues including K-12 schools, technical colleges, clubs, military installations, and department stores. In Osborn's era, exhibitions circulated internationally but the majority were designed for U.S. use.

A notable example of Osborn's efforts is Elements of Design, a 24-panel poster set packaged to travel by mail for installation virtually anywhere, with graphics by designer and artist Robert Wolff.

=== Later career ===
In the late 1940s and 1950s, Osborn was involved with the American Federation of Arts as an Exhibition Committee advisor and International Exhibitions Committee vice chairman.

In 1953, Osborn authored the UNESCO Manual of Traveling Exhibitions, which received several scholarly reviews.

Osborn was also interested in film. She established the Salisbury Film Society (1951), served as an officer of the Robert Flaherty International Film Seminar (1968–1979), and as a MacDowell Colony board member (beginning in 1969) helped to make filmmakers eligible for fellowships.
