= Lisa Small =

American art historian

Lisa Small is an American art historian and museum curator. She is a curator of Exhibitions at the Brooklyn Museum, and most widely known for her 2014 blockbuster exhibition, Killer Heels.

Small earned her B.A. from B.A. from Colgate University, the M.A. and M.Phil from City University of New York in Art History, and an M.A. in Arts Administration from New York University.

She worked as a curator at the Dahesh Museum of Art and as Curator of Exhibitions at the American Federation of Arts before moving to the Brooklyn.

== Books ==
- Killer Heels: The Art of the High-Heeled Shoe Prestel, 2014 (3791353802)
- Monet and Venice (co-authored with Melissa E. Buron), 2025 (ISBN 978-0-847-87596-2).
