= Objects of Bright Pride =

1978 non-fiction book

Objects of Bright Pride: Northwest Coast Indian Art from the American Museum of Natural History
- Author: Allen Wardwell
- Publisher: University of Washington Press, on behalf of The Center for Inter-American Relations and the American Federation of Arts
- Publication date: 1978
- OCLC: 5028622

Objects of Bright Pride: Northwest Coast Indian Art from the American Museum of Natural History is a non-fiction book by Allen Wardwell about the Indigenous Northwest Coast art collection in the American Museum of Natural History. It was published in 1978 by The Center for Inter-American Relations and the American Federation of Arts and distributed by the University of Washington Press.

The book was based on a travelling exhibition, organized by Wardell and the American Museum of Natural History. Wardwell was, at the time, the director of the museum's Asia House Gallery.
