= Killer Heels =

Exhibition that ran at the Brooklyn Museum, US

Coordinates: 40.446513°N 79.902329°W

Killer Heels (Killer Heels: The Art of the High-Heeled Shoe) was a blockbuster exhibition that ran at the Brooklyn Museum from September 10, 2014 – March 1, 2015.

The exhibition displayed high-heeled footwear, for men and women, as art objects. The New York Times called the exhibition, "mesmerizing, disturbing but undeniably consummate." The Museum extended the extremely popular show an additional 2 weeks beyond the scheduled closing date.

The curator was Lisa Small, who also edited a well-received illustrated book on the topic, "Killer Heels: The Art of the High-Heeled Shoe. Photographer Steven Klein collaborated on the exhibit.

Killer Heels was also presented later at:

- Albuquerque Museum of Art and History in 2015,
- Frick Art & Historical Center in Pittsburgh in 2016,
- Currier Museum of Art in New Hampshire.
