= Kyawthuite =

Oxide mineral

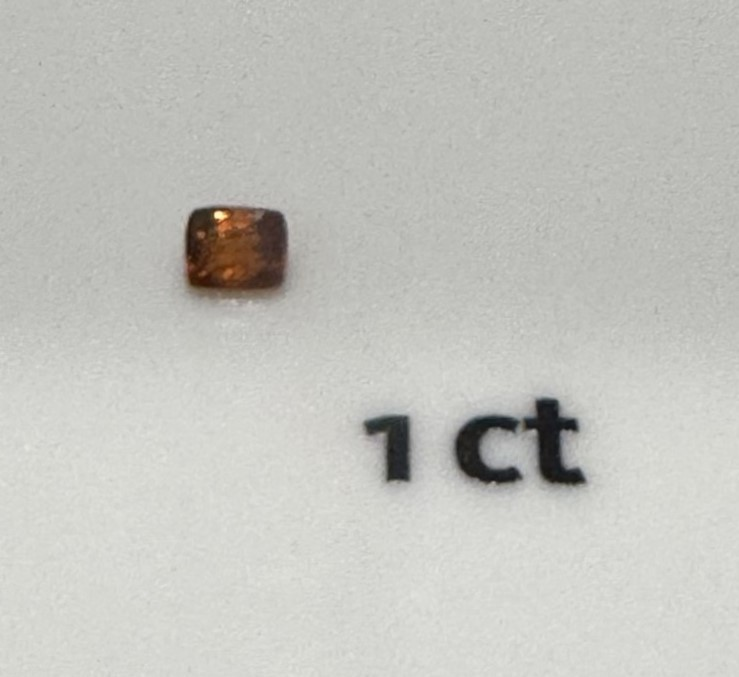
- The only known kyawthuite sample, on display at the Natural History Museum of Los Angeles County

General
- Category: Oxide mineral
- Formula: BiSbO_{4}
- IMA symbol: Kyw
- Crystal system: Monoclinic
- Crystal class: Prismatic (2/m) (same H-M symbol)
- Space group: I2/c
- Unit cell: a = 5.46 Å, b = 4.89 Å c = 11.85 Å, β = 101.20° (approximated); Z = 4

Identification
- Color: Reddish-orange
- Cleavage: Three cleavages: {001} perfect, {110} and {11̅0} good
- Fracture: Conchoidal
- Tenacity: Brittle
- Mohs scale hardness: 5 1/2
- Luster: Adamantine
- Streak: White
- Density: 8.256 g/cm³

Kyawthuite (pronounced cha-too-ite) is a rare mineral with the formula BiSbO_{4}. It is a naturally occurring bismuth antimonate, with bismuth in the +3 oxidation state and antimony in the +5 state. It is the only bismuth–antimony oxide approved as a mineral, and it is named after Kyaw Thu, the Burmese gemmologist who recognised the stone as unusual.

The mineral is known from a single water-worn crystal found in alluvium near Mogok, Myanmar. The crystal was cut into a reddish-orange gem weighing 1.61 carats. Since no second natural specimen has been reported, popular-science accounts often call kyawthuite the rarest mineral on Earth. The only known sample is on display at the Natural History Museum of Los Angeles County.

== History ==
In 2010, Burmese gemmologist Kyaw Thu acquired the stone at a market in Chaung-gyi, near Mogok, believing the rough crystal to be scheelite. One account says he bought two water-worn crystals, one yellow and one orange, from a miner known as "Kha-ne-say". Their density and lustre led him to think both were scheelite. He paid only a few kyats for the stone. After it was faceted, however, its appearance struck him as unusual. He later told The Myanmar Times that something about it had seemed off from the moment he bought it. He also said that, as far as he knew, it was the first of its kind and had not been found in any other country.

Back in Yangon, Kyaw Thu examined the stone again and decided it was unlike any gem he had encountered before. He had studied the Mogok area's gem deposits for his doctorate, and in his 2007 dissertation at the University of Yangon he noted that some gems already on the market might be new species awaiting identification. Unable to match the stone to any known gem, he sent it to the Gemological Institute of America's laboratory in Bangkok. The staff could not identify it either, but X-ray diffraction showed that the orange stone matched synthetic BiSbO_{4}.

The stone was then studied by Anthony R. Kampf of the Natural History Museum of Los Angeles County, George R. Rossman and Chi Ma of the California Institute of Technology, and Peter A. Williams of the University of Western Sydney. The International Mineralogical Association officially recognised kyawthuite as a new mineral in 2015, under the designation IMA 2015-078, and the full description appeared in Mineralogical Magazine in 2017.

== Etymology ==
The mineral is named after Kyaw Thu, the gemmologist who first identified it. He holds a PhD from Yangon University and works as a mineralogist, petrologist and gemmologist. He also runs the Macle Gem Trade Laboratory in Myanmar. The name is pronounced "cha-too-ite".

== Description ==
Kyawthuite is monoclinic, with space group I2/c, and has the same structure as clinocervantite, its trivalent antimony analogue. It is also structurally identical to synthetic β-Sb_{2}O_{4}, the laboratory-made equivalent of clinocervantite. Kyawthuite is the antimony analogue of clinobisvanite, though Mindat notes a slight difference between their space groups. Mindat also identifies it as the only approved bismuth–antimony oxide mineral.

The faceted stone is transparent and reddish orange, with an adamantine lustre and a white streak. It has a Mohs hardness of 5 1/2 and is brittle, with a conchoidal fracture. Its cleavage is perfect parallel to {001} and good in two other directions. Its measured density is 8.256 g/cm^{3}, slightly higher than the calculated value of 8.127 g/cm^{3}—and more than eight times the density of water.

Kyawthuite is biaxial, with a 2V angle close to 90°, and shows no noticeable pleochroism. Its refractive indices are estimated at about 2.19 (α), 2.27 (β) and 2.35 (γ). The unit cell measures a = 5.4624(4) Å, b = 4.88519(17) Å and c = 11.8520(8) Å, with β = 101.195(7)° and a volume of 310.25(3) Å^{3}. It contains four formula units. Researchers refined the crystal structure to an R_{1} value of 0.0269 using 593 reflections. In the powder X-ray diffraction pattern, the strongest line is at 3.266 Å, followed by lines at 2.900 and 1.8026 Å. The stone also contains hollow, tube-like inclusions arranged en echelon, which ScienceAlert linked to shear stress and cited as evidence that the crystal formed naturally. In optical terms, the X direction aligns with the crystallographic b axis, while Y lies roughly along c and Z roughly along a.

Electron microprobe analyses give the crystal an empirical formula of (Bi_{0.82}Sb_{0.18})(Sb_{0.99}Ta_{0.01})O_{4}. This means that trivalent antimony replaces about 18% of the bismuth, while a trace amount of tantalum takes the place of pentavalent antimony. The infrared spectrum indicates traces of hydroxyl or water, and the Raman spectrum is similar to that of the synthetic compound.

The structure consists of SbO_{6} octahedra joined at their corners to form flat layers parallel to {001}, each punctured by square openings. Bismuth atoms sit on either side of these openings, bonding with oxygen atoms in neighbouring layers and binding the layers into a three-dimensional framework. The oxygen atoms around each bismuth form a distorted, eight-coordinate arrangement—a geometry commonly associated with cations that have a stereochemically active lone pair.

== Occurrence ==
The crystal was recovered from alluvium at Chaung-gyi-ah-le-ywa in the Chaung-gyi valley, the mineral's type locality and the only locality on record. Since it was found as a water-worn fragment in alluvium rather than in its original bedrock, its source rock must be inferred. Its chemistry points to a pegmatitic origin: alongside a small amount of tantalum, the stone contains traces of titanium, niobium, tungsten and uranium, all consistent with that setting. Laboratory experiments show that bismuth antimonate crystallises at high temperatures comparable to those found in cooling magma, which also supports a pegmatitic origin, although the special conditions that made the mineral so rare are unknown.

Mogok sits in a belt of metamorphic rocks shaped by the collision of the Indian and Asian plates, and popular accounts link the region's gem wealth to that collision, which they date to the Paleocene–Eocene. Besides ruby, the district yields sapphire, spinel, tourmaline, peridot and the borate mineral painite.

The district belongs to the Mogok Metamorphic Belt, a strip of high-grade metamorphic rock running through northern Myanmar. Geologists recognise two episodes of metamorphism there, one in the Early Jurassic and one in the Early Tertiary, and the gem deposits formed through a mixture of metamorphism, igneous intrusion and skarn reactions. Among the igneous rocks are ultramafic types such as dunite and harzburgite, which are cut by pegmatite veins and graphic granite dykes. Rubies and spinels grew when limestone recrystallised into marble during mountain building, whereas pegmatites, which are igneous intrusions that can form large gem pockets inside other rocks, host a separate group of stones. For centuries the hills were reputed to hold so many gems that residents were said to find them glinting in the grass of their gardens. Weathering of these rocks has concentrated gems in river gravels and caves, which have historically been the richest deposits.

Kyaw Thu's dissertation sorted the gems of the Mogok Stone Tract into three groups by origin: metamorphic stones such as ruby and spinel, igneous stones such as the pegmatitic gems and peridot, and stones formed in skarn, such as painite, all concentrated in a relatively small area. Only one 0.3-gram sample of the naturally occurring form of this mineral is documented. It is the faceted 1.61-carat stone, which measures about 5.8 × 4.58 × 3 mm, and it serves as the type material, catalogued as number 65602 in the Mineral Sciences Department of the Natural History Museum of Los Angeles County, where it is on display.

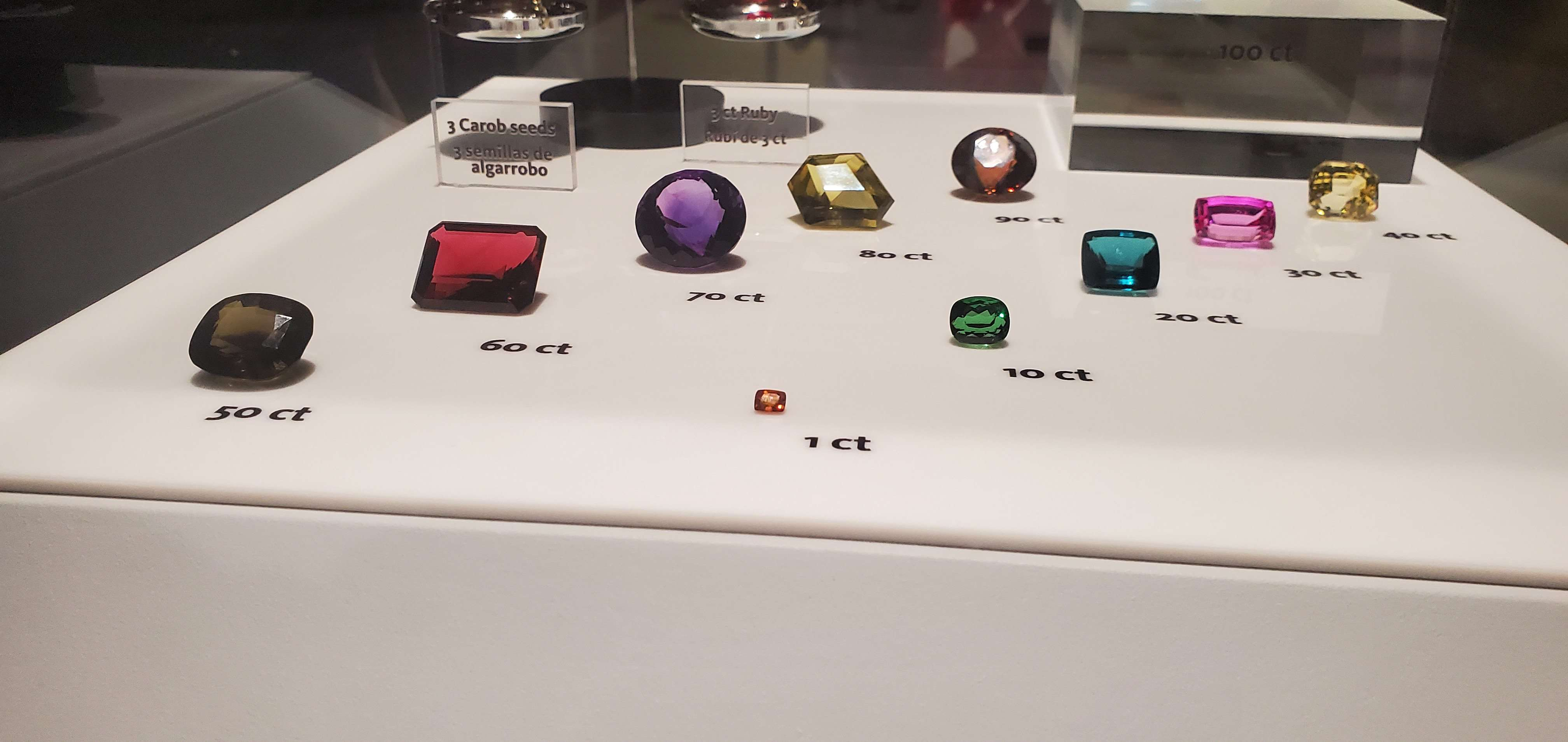
A pedestal at the Natural History Museum of Los Angeles County, displaying the only known piece of kyawthuite, as well as various other gemstones.

== Rarity ==
Kyawthuite counts as the rarest known mineral only because a single natural specimen has been documented; bismuth and antimony are not scarce elements, and what is unusual is their combination in this structure. Whether any more exist is unknown, and the conditions that produced the one crystal are still uncertain. The political situation in Mogok complicates any search. The Ta'ang National Liberation Army controlled the town from July 2024 until it agreed in October 2025 to withdraw under a China-mediated ceasefire, and by May 2026 the area had returned to military control. Gemstone sales have been a source of revenue for both the military and armed groups, and concerns about mining conditions have led some buyers to boycott Myanmar stones, which limits study of the region's rare minerals. Mining in the area has drawn criticism for unsafe conditions, forced labour and child exploitation. ZME judged another discovery unlikely, given the political obstacles and the odds of repeating such a geological fluke. Gem mining continued through the recent upheaval, and in April 2026 miners near Mogok reportedly unearthed an 11,000-carat rough ruby, said to be the second-largest by weight found in Myanmar.

The International Mineralogical Association recognises about 6,000 mineral species, and popular accounts treat kyawthuite as the rarest of them. In June 2017 the Natural History Museum of Los Angeles County described it on social media as the world's rarest gem, known from a single specimen held in its collections. Because no other specimens exist to set a market price, ScienceAlert described its value as effectively beyond measure, and contrasted it with painite, which sells for about US$50,000 to $60,000 per carat. The stone is also small enough that more thorough testing could not be carried out without damaging it.

== Synthetic analogue ==
BiSbO_{4} was already well known as a synthetic compound before the mineral was recognised, and the laboratory-made material has attracted attention in several fields. Its crystal structure has been investigated by X-ray powder diffraction, which provided a basis for later work on its properties. A 1975 study reported growing single crystals of the compound from the vapour, and in 1995 Enjalbert and colleagues refined its structure while comparing how bismuth is arranged in layers of different types. In electronics research, it has been studied as a ceramic with microwave dielectric properties; one study examined how adding calcium titanate (CaTiO_{3}) changes the densification and microwave dielectric behaviour of BiSbO_{4} ceramics. In environmental chemistry, BiSbO_{4} prepared as nanoplates by a hydrothermal route has been tested as a photocatalyst, a material that uses light to drive chemical reactions, for breaking down organic pollutants such as benzene and 4-chlorophenol.
