= Clinocervantite =

Monoclinic-prismatic mineral

Clinocervantite is a monoclinic-prismatic mineral with a chemical formula of Sb^{3+}Sb^{5+}O_{4}. It was discovered in 1999 in cavities of waste rock at the Cetine Mine in Siena, Italy.

== Description ==
Clinocervantite is colorless or white and has a vitreous luster. It has a white streak.

It is isostructural with kyawthuite. The name clinocervantite reflects its relationship with cervantite. It is monoclinic-prismatic polymorph. It has a specific gravity of 6.72 and a molecular weight of 307.50 gm. It has a biaxial optical class.
