= American Art Directory =

- Frontispiece from 1898 volume
- Frequency: Annual
- First issue: 1898
- Language: English
- Website: http://www.americanartdir.com/
- ISSN: 0065-6968

The American Art Directory is a yearly publication covering art museums, arts centers, and art educational institutions as well as news, obituaries, book and magazine publications, etc. related to the artistic community in the United States. Established in 1898, it was originally entitled American Art Annual.

Art consultant, advisor, author, and independent appraiser Alan Bamberger describes the Directory as "...a required reference for art museums, libraries, arts organizations, art schools, and corporations with art holdings."

A yearly feature is the "Review of the Year" article discussing the touring exhibitions, commissions, grants to organizations, construction starts at museums and other facilities, and various other events that occur within the art community.

Initially the directory was the work of the New York area artist Florence Nightingale Levy and published by The Macmillan Company. The American Federation of Arts, with which Mrs. Levy was associated and which she would later become the president of, was founded in 1909 and in 1913 the directory became an official publication of that organization. It later became the independent publication it exists as currently.

In 1952 the American Art Annual was split into two separate publications, Who's Who in American Art and the American Art Directory.
