= Leila Mechlin =

American art critic

- Born: May 29, 1874
- Died: May 6, 1949
- Occupation: Art critic

Leila Mechlin (May 29, 1874 – May 6, 1949) was an American art critic. Writing from 1900 to 1946, she was the first female art critic in the United States. She was a cofounder of the American Federation of Arts and founding editor of its arts journal. She was an elected member of the Royal Society of Arts in London.

== Early life ==
Leila Mechlin was born on May 29, 1874, at 41 Gay Street (later 2818 N Street) in Georgetown, Washington, D.C. She was the daughter of commission agent Frederick Alexander Smith Mechlin and portrait and genre painter Cornelia Stout (Hyatt) Mechlin. Leila's maternal grandfather was a noted engraver who cofounded the Bureau of Engraving and Printing. She attended public schools and then the Corcoran School of the Art, where her mother kept a studio.

== Career ==
Mechlin was art critic for the Washington Evening Star from 1900 until retiring in June 1946. Writing in memoriam, one of Mechlin’s successors as Star art critic Florence S. Berryman summarized Mechlin’s perspective on art:

“In her opinion, a work of art dealt with something beautiful (in the largest sense), of emotional significance, presented with good craftsmanship. She felt that these characteristics were embodied in traditional art, in the evolution from the kind of work which ‘generations had agreed to admire,’ more often than in the experimental work that stemmed from the ‘School of Paris’ and the Armory Show. She had deep convictions and the moral courage to fight for them.”

In 1909, Mechlin was a cofounder (with figures like Andrew Mellon, J. P. Morgan and Presidents William Howard Taft and Theodore Roosevelt) of the American Federation of Arts, intended to promote American art and particularly touring of American art exhibitions to more remote parts of the United States; Mechlin served as its secretary until 1933. She founded and edited, from 1909 to 1931, the AFA's magazine, originally titled Art and Progress and later called the Magazine of Art.

She was a contributor to Funk & Wagnalls Yearbook, the Encyclopædia Britannica, and the Dictionary of National Biography.

She was an early advocate for the establishment of the National Gallery of Art and helped establish the Mint Museum of Art in Charlotte, North Carolina.

She was a member of many clubs and associations, including the Literary Society of Washington, the Arts Club of Washington, Washington Society of Fine Arts (where she was secretary), Friends of Music of the Library of Congress, National Symphony Orchestra Association and National Arts Club, the American Association of University Women, the Cosmopolitan Club of New York, and the American Newspaper Women’s Club.

== Awards and honors ==
Leila Mechlin was awarded two honorary degrees: an honorary master of arts from George Washington University in 1921 and an honorary doctor of fine art from the University of Nebraska in 1927.

Leila Mechlin was elected a fellow of the Royal Society of Arts in London in 1940.

== Death and legacy ==
Leila Mechlin died on May 6, 1949, in Washington, D.C. She was 74. At the time of her death she was residing at 1402 21st Street, NW, Washington.
