= American Federation of Arts =

Nonprofit organization

- AFA Logo
- Established: 1909
- Location: 305 East 47th Street; 10th Floor; New York, NY
- Director: Pauline Forlenza
- Website: www.afaweb.org

The American Federation of Arts (AFA) is a nonprofit organization that creates art exhibitions for presentation in museums around the world, publishes exhibition catalogues, and develops education programs. The organization's founding in 1909 was endorsed by Theodore Roosevelt and spearheaded by Secretary of State Elihu Root and eminent art patrons and artists of the day. The AFA's mission is to enrich the public's experience and understanding of the visual arts, and this is accomplished through its exhibitions, catalogues, and public programs. To date, the AFA has organized or circulated approximately 3,000 exhibitions that have been viewed by more than 10 million people in museums in every state, as well as in Canada, Latin America, Europe, Asia, and Africa.

== History ==
=== Early history and publications ===
The AFA was founded on May 12, 1909.

At a meeting on May 11, 1909, convened by the National Academy of Art Board of Regents—among whom were President William Howard Taft, former president Theodore Roosevelt, Cecilia Beaux, Robert Woods Bliss, William Merritt Chase, Robert W. DeForest, Homer Saint-Gaudens, Charles L. Hutchinson, Archer M. Huntington, Senator Henry Cabot Lodge, Leila Mechlin, Andrew W. Mellon, J. Pierpont Morgan, Francis D. Millet, Secretary of State Elihu Root, and Henry Walters, among others— Elihu Root called for the formation of an agency that would send “exhibitions of original works of art on tour to the hinterlands of the United States.” With the unanimous endorsement of Root's motion by representatives from more than eighty American art institutions—among them, the Metropolitan Museum of Art, the Corcoran Gallery of Art, and the American Academy in Rome—the AFA was founded on May 12, 1909. The organization's founders further agreed to hold annual meetings and devote themselves to promoting the visual arts as a vital component of the nation's cultural life. Hutchinson, who at the time was the President of the Art Institute of Chicago, was elected the organization's first president.

When Root proposed the creation of the AFA in 1909, the nation's artistic wealth was largely concentrated in eastern cities and inaccessible to most citizens. The AFA and its traveling exhibitions were envisioned as a means of “bringing the museum to the people.” During its inaugural year, the AFA organized three traveling exhibitions, the first of which was Thirty-Eight Oil Paintings by Prominent American Artists, and launched Art and Progress magazine (later renamed Magazine of Art), an innovative vehicle for art scholarship that continued to be published until 1953. Mechlin, art critic at The Washington Star, was the magazine's founding editor and continued in the role through 1931. The Thirty-Eight Paintings exhibition was viewed by more than 5,600 people at the library before traveling to New Orleans, St. Paul, and New Ulm, Minnesota.

The AFA also published the first edition of Who's Who in American Art (1935), as well as the American Art Annual (later known as the American Art Directory). While it no longer publishes these directories and journals, the AFA retains a commitment to publishing new art historical research through the catalogues it produces in conjunction with its exhibitions.

=== Lobbying efforts ===
In 1910, the AFA promoted the creation of a National Commission of Fine Arts, which was subsequently established by an act of congress to advise the government on matters of art and design as they pertain to the nation's capital. In 1913, the AFA launched a successful lobbying effort to remove tariffs on art entering the United States and a 1916 session with the Interstate Commerce Commission to protest prohibitively high interstate taxes on traveling art.

In 1920, the AFA was instrumental in organizing a lobbying campaign for the “development of a national gallery of art on a basis worthy of our great nation,” a goal eventually realized with the founding of the National Gallery of Art in 1941. Other government-tied AFA initiatives include arranging the first American representation in the Venice Biennale in 1924 and thereafter until the 1970s.

=== Public programs ===
The AFA's history includes a series of programs designed to facilitate greater access and appreciation of the visual arts, among them, the first nationally broadcast radio programs about art (1930s–1940s); the Picture of the Month Program (1954), offering original paintings at low rental fees to small art and educational organizations; the Museum Donor Program (1960s), distributing allowances to regional museums to purchase contemporary American art; The Art of Seeing (1965), a landmark series of educational films on visual perception; The Curriculum in Visual Education (1966), a collection of films and instructional materials designed to heighten the aesthetic awareness of children; the Rent-an-Artist Program (renamed the Visitor Artist Program) (1970s), placing artists in residency at museums around the country; A History of the American Avant-Garde Cinema (1976), the first curatorially selected international traveling film program; and ART ACCESS I and II (1989–98), a fee-subsidy program sponsored by the Lila Wallace-Reader's Digest Fund making AFA exhibitions of American art more affordable for museums.

In 1909, the AFA created the Package Library, which offered newspaper and magazine clippings on a variety of art subjects for loan to AFA members. Although intended primarily for use in communities with limited library facilities, the files were often in demand by members in larger cities as well. By 1942, the library included more than 1,000 envelopes covering topics from contemporary American painting to industrial art.

In 1934, in collaboration with the General Federation of Women's Clubs and with support from the Carnegie Corporation, the AFA launched the first nationally broadcast radio series on art, "Art in America 1600–1865," with René d'Harnoncourt as program director. The first subject was “America After the Civil War: Whistler and Winslow Homer—Expatriate and Stay-at-Home.” Discontinued during World War II, the radio program was reestablished in the 1940s with the title “Living Art.”

In 1994, the AFA inaugurated the Directors Forum, a two-and-a-half-day annual conference for museum directors that featured panel discussions with some of the most distinguished professionals in the art world. Beginning in 2005, the Directors Forum is now an annual program of the independent Art Museum Partnership. Building upon the success of that program, the AFA began, in 2001, a similar conference for art museum curators. The Curators Forum later evolved into the independent Association of Art Museum Curators in 2001. In 2003, the AFA instituted ArtTalks, a lecture series featuring prominent artists and other influential figures of the art world, among them, artists Janine Antoni, Christo and Jeanne-Claude, John Currin, Shirin Neshat, and Do-Ho Suh; New York Times critic Roberta Smith; New Yorker writer Adam Gopnik; and Sotheby's Worldwide Head of Contemporary Art Tobias Meyer.

Most recently, the AFA launched ArtViews, a series of panel discussions that address critical issues in the museum field. Its first edition held in 2011 was titled "Shifting Challenges in the Protection of Archaeological Heritage" and was organized in conjunction with the Institute of Fine Arts and the Association of Art Museum Directors. More recent subjects have included: "Art Museum Funding at the Crossroads" (2012), "Art Museum Blockbusters: Myths, Facts, and their Future (2013), "Digital Space/Physical Space, Mapping the 21st Century Museum" (2015), "The Future of Art Museum Leadership" (2016), and "Museums Now: Relevance and Representation" (2017).

=== Film and video ===
Through the development of touring film and video exhibitions, publications, and an eventual collection of 139 documentaries on the arts and avant-garde films and videos, the AFA developed a groundbreaking film and video program that focused on the work of independent contemporary media artists in this country and abroad. Released beginning in 1949, the organization's publications on the subject include the pamphlet Guide to Films on Art (1949); Films on Art (1952), a comprehensive guide that listed and reviewed more than 450 films on art subjects; New American Filmmakers (1971), a catalogue of independent films produced in cooperation with the Whitney Museum; A History of the American Avant-Garde Cinema (1976); Films on Art: A Source Book (1977), the second edition of the 1952 volume Films on Art; and Before Hollywood: Turn-of-the-Century Film from American Archives (1987).

In 1959, the AFA co-sponsored the first art film festival in the U.S.—Films on Art Festival, in Woodstock, New York, with the Woodstock Artists Association, the College Art Association, Hunter College, and the Metropolitan Museum of Art. In 1969, the AFA established Circulating Films on Art, thus becoming the first organization of its kind to circulate such films for rent. In 1971, the AFA began circulating 200 films from the Whitney's New American Filmmakers series, expanding the collaboration in 1979 with the circulation of films from the Whitney Biennial and again in 1983 with the addition of video to the Biennial. In 1976, the AFA organized the first curatorially selected international traveling film exhibition, A History of the American Avant-Garde Cinema. In addition to its traveling video selections from the Whitney, in 1983, the AFA began organizing independent traveling video exhibitions, the first of which included American Documentary Video: Subject to Change; New Video: Japan; and Revisiting Romance: New Feminist Video.

In 1993, the AFA transferred its collection of prize-winning American and European films and videotapes to the Museum of Modern Art’s Circulating Film and Video program, and in 1996, upon the dissolution of its Media Arts Department, transferred its inventory of film and video exhibitions to the Film and Video Department of the Museum of Modern Art.

=== Offices and mergers ===
After initial meetings in Francis Millet’s studio in Washington, D.C., in 1909 the AFA moved its headquarters into the Octagon Building at 1741 New York Avenue, N.W., renting space from the American Institute of Architects. The National League of Handicraft Societies merged with the AFA in 1912, and constituent societies were made AFA members. In 1913, the AFA opened its first New York office in the Fine Arts Building at 215 West 57th Street. The office later moved to the Metropolitan Museum of Art and then to 40 East 49th Street. Beginning in 1952, the AFA relocated its headquarters, moving from Washington, D.C. to New York, renting offices at 1083 Fifth Avenue. In 1987, the AFA's merger with the Art Museum Association of America (AMAA) brought together the two oldest nonprofit art museum organizations in America, creating a larger national organization that could offer a comprehensive set of services without duplication. Retaining the name American Federation of Arts, the new organization maintained offices in both New York and San Francisco, and former AMAA Director Myrna Smoot became director.

The San Francisco office was dedicated to the AFA's Museum Services Department. Also based in the West Coast was the AFA's administration of the Getty’s Museum Management Institution (MMI), a training program for museum directors held at Berkeley. Now known as the Getty Leadership Institute, it is a program of the Getty Trust and operates out of Claremont Graduate University. In 1990, the AFA closed its West Coast office and moved the Museum Services Department to its New York headquarters. In 2007, the AFA sold its townhouse at 41 East 65th Street and moved to its current location at 305 East 47th Street.

=== Notable members ===
- Una B. Herrick, American educator, the first Dean of Women at Montana State College.

== Exhibitions ==
AFA exhibitions encompass a wide range of mediums, artists, historical periods, and cultural traditions—from Roman portraiture and Native American artifacts to American impressionism and contemporary art and sculpture. The AFA also collaborates with distinguished institutions around the world to tour important aspects of their collections. To further engage and inform museum visitors and art enthusiasts, the AFA produces innovative educational components and richly illustrated catalogues introducing original scholarship.

Exhibition highlights, 1950s–present

- Sport in Art (began touring 1955)
- Cuban Painting Today (1956)
- Art and the Found Object (1958)
- Ten Negro Artists from the United States (1966)
- Pop and Op (1966)
- Rejective Art (1967–8; curated by Lucy Lippard, including works by Brice Marden, Agnes Martin, Robert Morris, Robert Smithson, Donald Judd, and Sol LeWitt, among others)
- Soft and Apparently Soft Sculpture (1968; including works by Louise Bourgeois, Hans Haacke, Eva Hesse, Yayoi Kusama, Claes Oldenburg, and Richard Serra, among others)
- Please Be Seated: The Evolution of the Chair, 2000 B.C.–2000 A.D. (1968)
- The Realist Revival (1972; including works by Jack Beal, Robert Bechtle, Richard Estes, Janet Fish, and Philip Pearlstein, among others)
- Masterworks from the Museum of Primitive Art (1974)
- Alberto Giacometti: Sculptor and Draftsman (1977)
- Objects of Bright Pride: Northwest Coast Indian Art from The American Museum of Natural History (1978 and again in 1988)
- The Painter and the Printer: Robert Motherwell’s Graphics (1980)
- The Other Side: European Avant-Garde Cinema, 1960–1980: A Film Exhibition (1983)
- Te Maori: Maori art from New Zealand Collections (1984)
- Mark Rothko: Works on Paper (1984)
- The Drawings of Stuart Davis: The Amazing Continuity (1992)
- Neo-Dada: Redefining Art, 1958–62 (1994)
- In the Spirit of Resistance: African-American Modernists and the Mexican Muralist School/En espíritu de la resistancia: Los modernistas africanoamericanos y la Escuela Muralista Mexicana (1996)
- Arthur Wesley Dow and American Arts and Crafts (1999)
- Wolfgang Laib: A Retrospective (2000)
- American Modern, 1925–1940: Design for a New Age (2000; including works by Norman Bel Geddes, Donald Deskey, Raymond Loewy, Lurelle Guild, Eliel Saarinen, and Frank Lloyd Wright, among others)
- Eternal Egypt: Masterworks from the British Museum (2001)
- Uncommon Legacies: Native American Art from the Peabody Essex Museum (2002)
- Degas and the Dance (2002)
- The Sensuous and the Sacred: Chola Bronzes from South India (2002)
- Debating American Modernism: Stieglitz, Duchamp, and the New York Avant-Garde (2003)
- An International Legacy: Selections from the Carnegie Museum of Art (2003; including works by Carl Andre, Elizabeth Murray, Gerhard Richter, Cindy Sherman, Gilbert & George, Rachel Whiteread, Nam June Paik, Bill Viola, and Tony Oursler, among others)
- Lorna Simpson (2006)
- Color as Field: American Painting, 1950–1975 (2007; including works by Helen Frankenthaler, Morris Louis, Kenneth Noland, Jules Olitski, Larry Poons, and Frank Stella, among others)
- Roman Art from the Louvre (2007)
- Symbols of Power: Napoleon and the Art of the Empire Style, 1800–1815 (2007)
- Turner to Cézanne: Masterpieces from the Davies Collection, National Museum Wales (2009) Curator: Lisa Small.
- Matisse as Printmaker (2009)
- Out of the Box: The Rise of Sneaker Culture (2015)
- Women Artists in Paris, 1850-1900 aka Her Paris: Women Artists in the Age of Impressionism (2017)
- Victorian Radicals: From the Pre-Raphaelites to the Arts & Crafts Movement (2018)

== Cultural Leadership Award ==
Each year, the American Federation of Arts presents a Cultural Leadership Award to individuals who have demonstrated extraordinary commitment to supporting art and museums, both nationally and internationally. The Cultural Leadership Award is formally presented to the honorees at the AFA's annual gala, which is attended by an elite group of leaders from society, business, and the cultural world. Proceeds from the gala help underwrite the AFA's traveling exhibitions.

Past Cultural Leadership Award recipients:

- 2018 – Eli and Edythe Broad, collectors and philanthropists
- 2017 – Charles and Valerie Diker, collectors and philanthropists; William Wegman, artist
- 2016 – Wangechi Mutu, artist; Alice Walton, philanthropist
- 2015 – Rosa and Carlos de la Cruz, collectors and philanthropists; Wade Guyton, artist; Arnold Lehman, director emeritus of the Brooklyn Museum
- 2014 – Spencer Finch, artist; Milton Esterow, former editor and publisher of ArtNews magazine
- 2013 – Eugene V. Thaw, philanthropist; Kehinde Wiley, artist
- 2012 – Sarah Sze, artist
- 2011 – Marina Abramović, performance artist; Earl A. Powell III, Director, National Gallery of Art, Washington, DC
- 2008 – Elizabeth Rohatyn, founder of FRAME (French Regional & American Museum Exchange)
- 2007 – His Excellency Sheikh Sultan Bin Tahnoon Al Nahyan, chairman, Abu Dhabi Tourism Authority and Tourism Development and Investment Company; Thomas Krens, Director, The Solomon R. Guggenheim Foundation; Frank O. Gehry, architect
- 2006 – Donna and Cargill MacMillan Jr., philanthropists
- 2004 – John Bryan, former CEO and chairman, Sara Lee; Shirin Neshat, artist; James Wood, outgoing Director and President, The Art Institute of Chicago
- 2003 – Susan Weber Soros, Founder and Director, Bard Graduate Center for Studies of Decorative Arts, Design, and Culture; Bill Viola, artist
- 2002 – Anne d'Harnoncourt, Director, Philadelphia Museum of Art; Maya Lin, architect
- 2001 – Ellsworth Kelly, artist; Stephanie French, AFA Trustee and Vice President, Corporate Contributions, Altria; John Walsh, outgoing Director, J. Paul Getty Museum
- 2000 – Jan Cowles, AFA Trustee; Serena Rattazzi, outgoing AFA Director
- 1999 – AFA's 90th Birthday Party - Jan Mayer, President, AFA Board of Trustees
- 1998 – Iris Cantor, philanthropist
- 1996 – Lee Hills, AFA Trustee and Chairman Emeritus, Knight Ridder
- 1995 – Betty Blake, AFA Trustee; Roy Neuberger, AFA Trustee and Founder, Neuberger Berman
- 1994 – Richard Oldenburg, former AFA Trustee and outgoing Director, Museum of Modern Art
- 1993 – Evan H. Turner, outgoing Director, The Cleveland Museum of Art
- 1992 – J. Carter Brown, outgoing Director, National Gallery of Art
- 1989 – "Perfectly Pop" 80th Anniversary – George Weissman, chairman of the board, Lincoln Center for the Performing Arts

== Museum membership ==
The AFA has maintained a membership program since its inception in 1909. AFA's approximate 60 members range from small regional museums, such as the Buddy Holly Center of Lubbock, Texas, to university galleries such as Colby College Museum of Art and Yale University Art Gallery, to larger institutions, among them, The Cleveland Museum of Art, the Museum of Fine Arts, Houston, and the Whitney Museum of American Art.
