= Museum Leadership Institute at Claremont Graduate University =

Educational program in California

The Museum Leadership Institute at Claremont Graduate University (MLI@CGU), California, United States, is an educational program that brings museum professionals, board members, academics, philanthropists and public officials together for continued professional development. Supported by the Getty Foundation, it was founded as the Getty Leadership Institute at Claremont Graduate University in 1979.

== History ==
Former LACMA President Melody Kanschat was appointed the new executive director of GLI in April 2013. Antoniette Guglielmo, an art historian and educator who worked at LACMA, The Metropolitan Museum of Art, and the J. Paul Getty Museum, was appointed Assistant Director in August 2013.

In September 2019, MLI @ CGU was awarded a $484,000 grant from the Institute of Museum and Library Services (IMLS) to launch a new online mentoring network for museum professionals called Polaris.

== Programs ==
MLI@CGU runs two blended-learning programs annually: NextGen for mid-level managers, and MLI for senior-level executives.

- MLI: The Museum Leadership Institute
- NextGen
- NextGen Now
- NextGen China
- Polaris
