= Brand Park =

Brand Park may refer to:

- Brand Park (Glendale, California)
- Brand Park (Mission Hills, Los Angeles)
