= Convento Building (Mission San Fernando) =

- Mission San Fernando Rey de Convento Building
- U.S. National Register of Historic Places
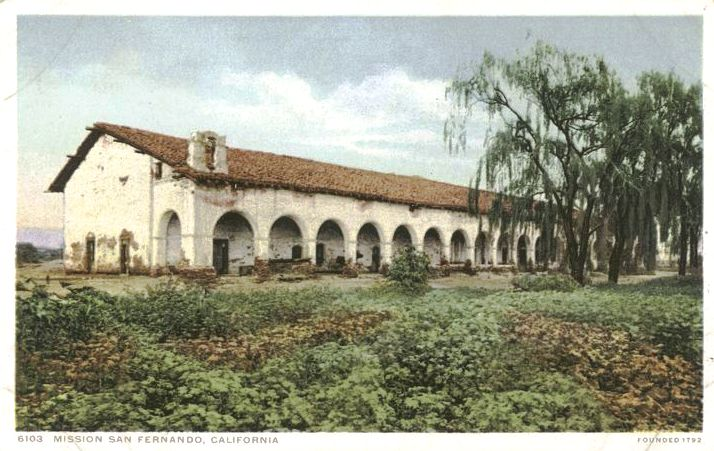
- Postcard of the Convento Building, 1900

- Location within the Los Angeles metropolitan area Location within California Location within the United States
- Location: 15151 San Fernando Mission Blvd., Mission Hills, Los Angeles, California
- Coordinates: 34°16′23″N 118°27′40″W
- Built: 1808–1822
- Architectural style: Colonial
- NRHP reference No.: 88002147
- Added to NRHP: October 27, 1988

The Convento Building, known for its iconic arched portico or colonnade, was built between 1808 and 1822 and is the only original building remaining at the Mission San Fernando Rey de España in the Mission Hills section of San Fernando Valley in California in the United States. It was also the largest adobe building in California and the largest original building at any of the California missions.

== The building ==
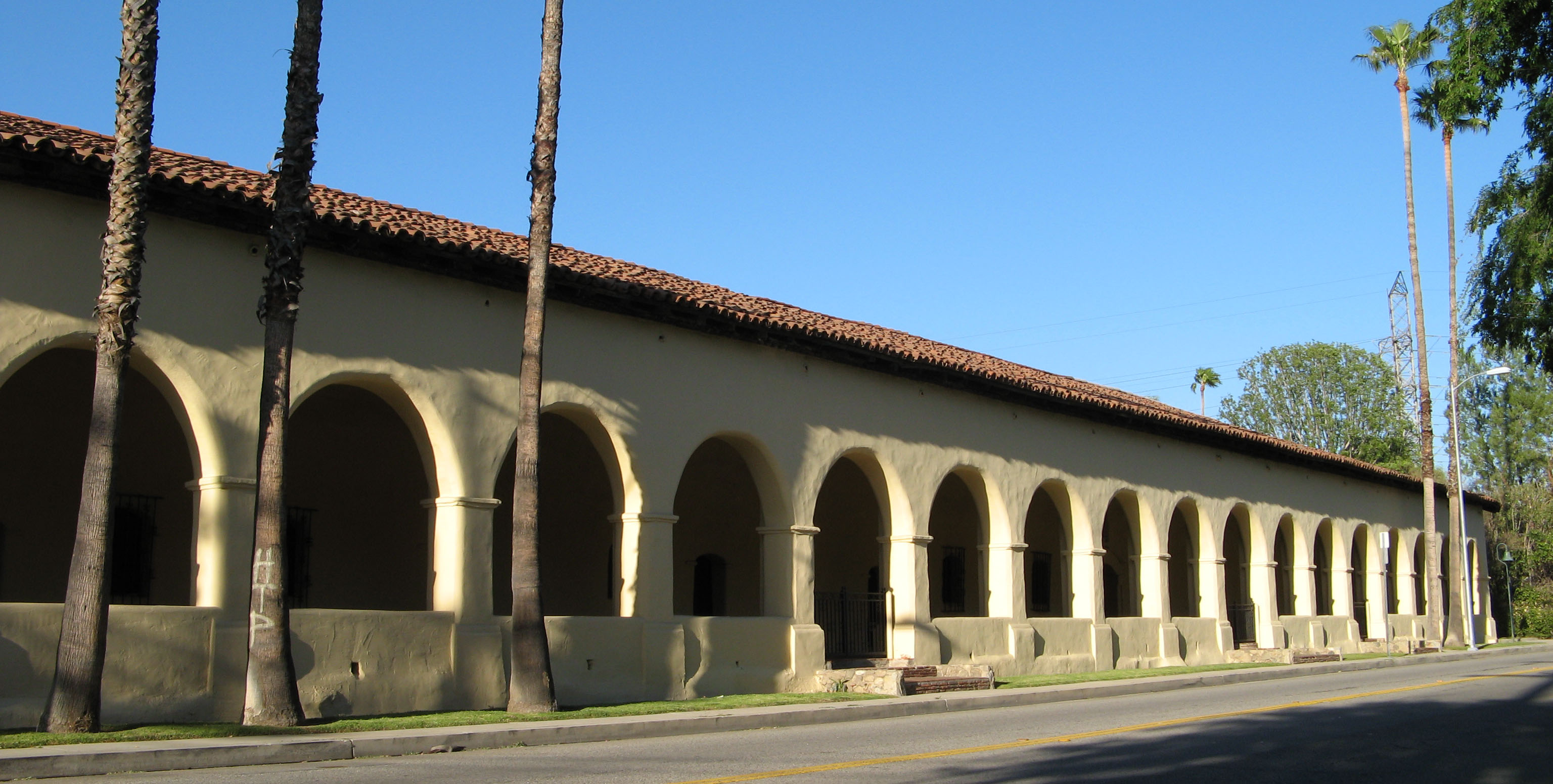
View of the Convento from the street

The Convento is a large two-story building, measuring approximately 243 feet (74 m) long and 50 feet (15 m) wide. It has four-foot-thick adobe walls and was built in stages between approximately 1808 and 1822. The long portico, sometimes referred to as the colonnade, in front of the building has 20 arches and is the most recognized image of the Mission San Fernando. It was and is the largest adobe structure in California and is also the largest original building in California's missions. The Convento also has a library with 1,760 volumes, dating from the 16th to the 19th centuries.

== History ==
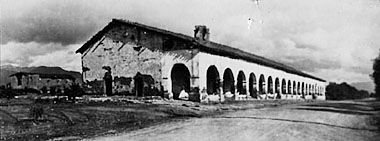
Photograph of the Convento taken by William Amos Haines, circa 1910

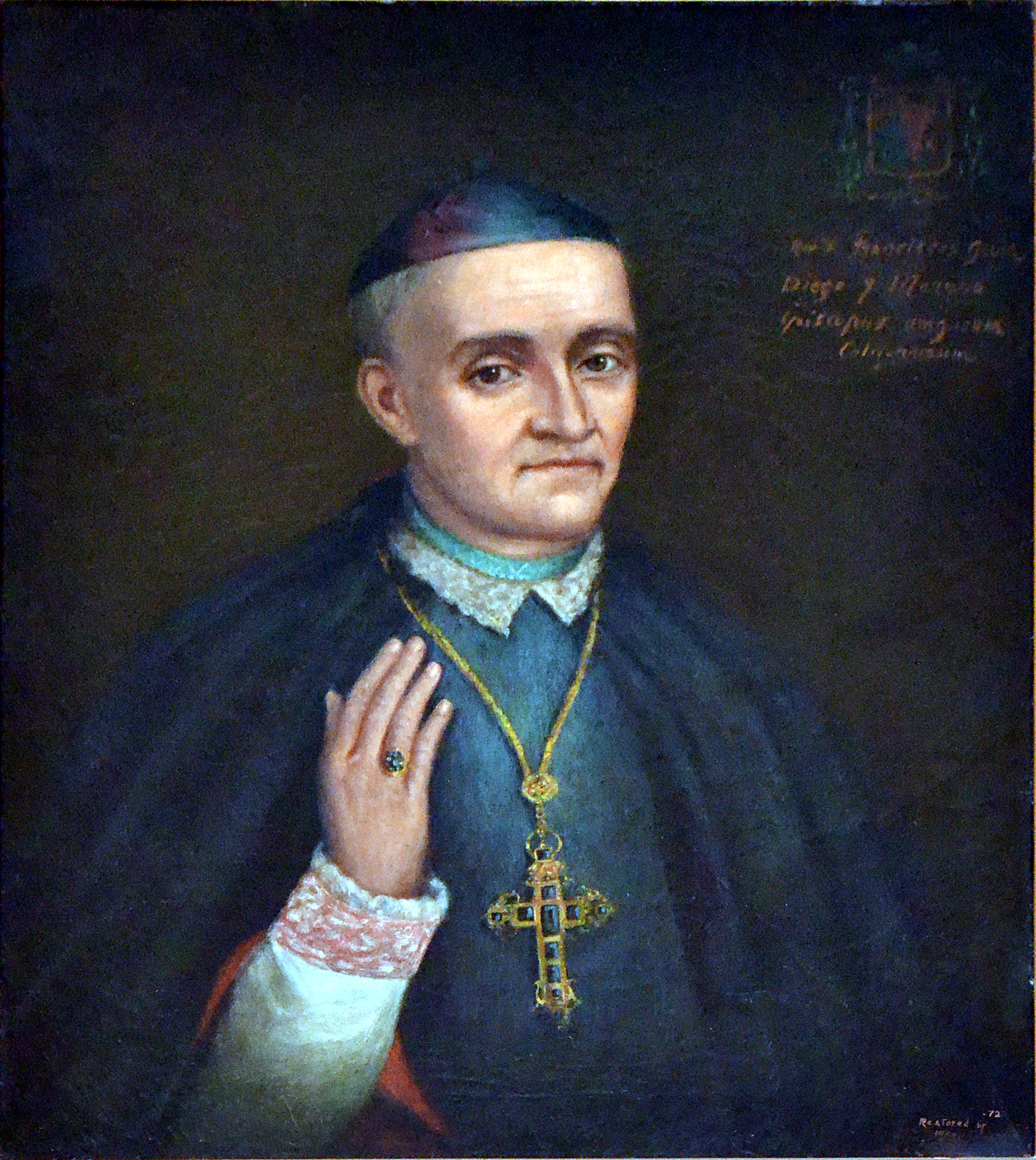
Painting of Francisco García Diego y Moreno at the Convento Building

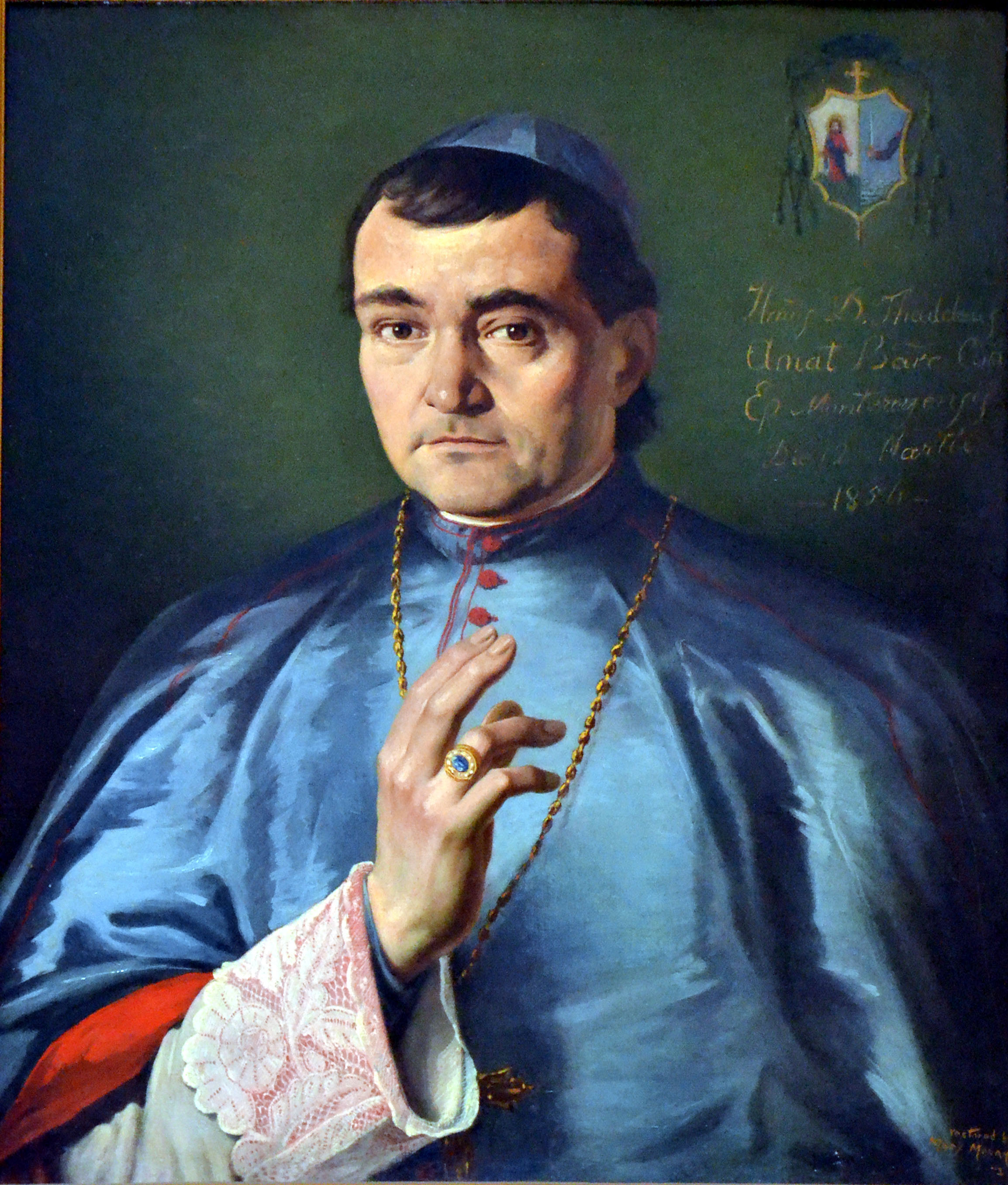
Painting of Thaddeus Amat y Brusi (first Bishop of Los Angeles) at the Convento Building

During the days of the Mission, the Convento was used as a residential building for the missionaries, including temporary accommodations for the missionaries as they traveled between the missions along the Camino Real. California's first bishop, Francisco García Diego y Moreno, lived at the Convento from 1820 to 1835.

In 1846, the Mexican government confiscated the missions and secularized the properties. Pio Pico became the owner of the Mission San Fernando, selling it in 1846 to Elogio de Chelis.

When John C. Fremont led an American military force into California in 1847, he occupied the Convento and used it as a base of operations. In October 31, 1853, the building was seen by a party of railroad surveyors who would describe it as "present[ing] an imposing appearance." Between 1857 and 1861, the Convento was used as a station for the Butterfield Stage Line between Los Angeles and San Francisco. The Los Angeles Times visited the Mission in 1883 and found it "rapidly going to decay." The one building that was reported to be in fair shape was the Convento, which the Times described as follows:

"The priest's quarters is a large structure, about three hundred feet long by fifty wide, with a broad portico or porch, supported by brick pillars, and extending the whole length of the building. The rafters are rough poles, thatched over with wild cane, and over this is a roof of burnt tile. ... This large building is in a fair state of preservation, and is tenanted by several Spanish families. Some carpenters (Spanish) are fitting up one end of the place for a Catholic church ..."

For most of the last half of the 19th Century, the Convento was left to decay. In 1896, the Landmarks Club (led by Charles Fletcher Lummis) signed a ten-year lease on the Mission, planning to restore it. A celebration attended by 500 people was held on the Mission's centennial in 1897. The Times reported at that time that the "old convent" building, "being strongly built," had "withstood more successfully the ravages of time." The Times report continued:

"The convent itself is in fairly good repair. The building is 240 feet (73 m) long by 60 deep, and is entered by doors from the corridor that runs its whole length. The tiled roof is nearly intact, and the window gratings and heavy doors are still strong enough to defy hostile entry. The floor of the corridor is simply the packed earth that has been trodden by thousands of feet, and its outer wall is pierced by a succession of low arches, in the familiar style of mission architecture."

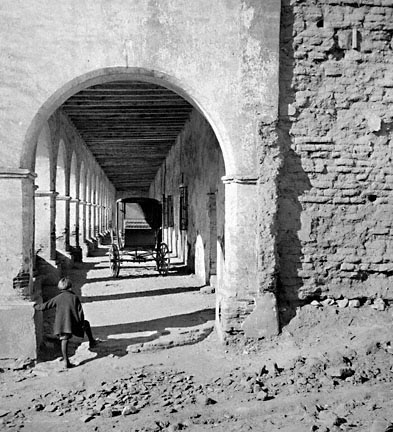
Photograph by Keystone-Mast, circa 1900

In 1963, the church undertook a restoration of the Convento, including removal of the roof, waterproofing of the structure, and replacement of the beams and original tile. During the 1963 restoration, workers found the old beams "firmly tied with strips of tough rawhide, revealing the craftsmanship of the Shoshone Indians who worked on the landmark in the early 1800s."

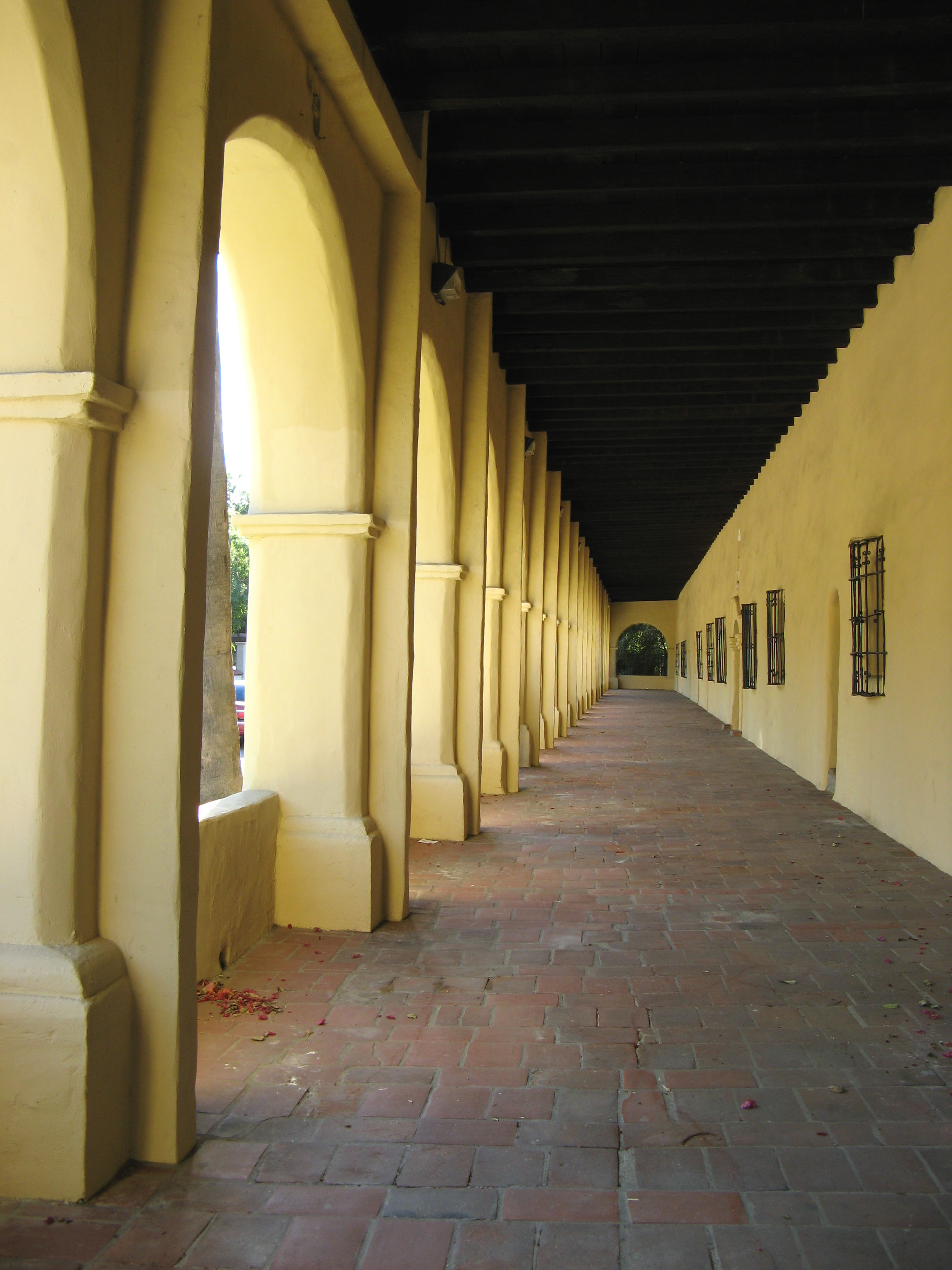
Portico of the Convento Building

In February 1971, the Mission sustained major damage from the 1971 San Fernando earthquake. The Mission's chapel was completely destroyed, and a massive fireplace in the center of the Convento shook loose and cracked several interior walls. Though the chapel was beyond repair, the Convento was restored in 1973, making it the only original building remaining from the original mission. As part of the repair process, the Convento was also reinforced, replastered, and painted inside and out. As the only original building remaining at the Mission San Fernando, the Convento was singled out in 1988 for inclusion on the National Register of Historic Places.

== See also ==
- List of Registered Historic Places in Los Angeles
- Mission San Fernando Rey de España
