= Mission San Fernando Rey de España =

18th-century Spanish mission in California

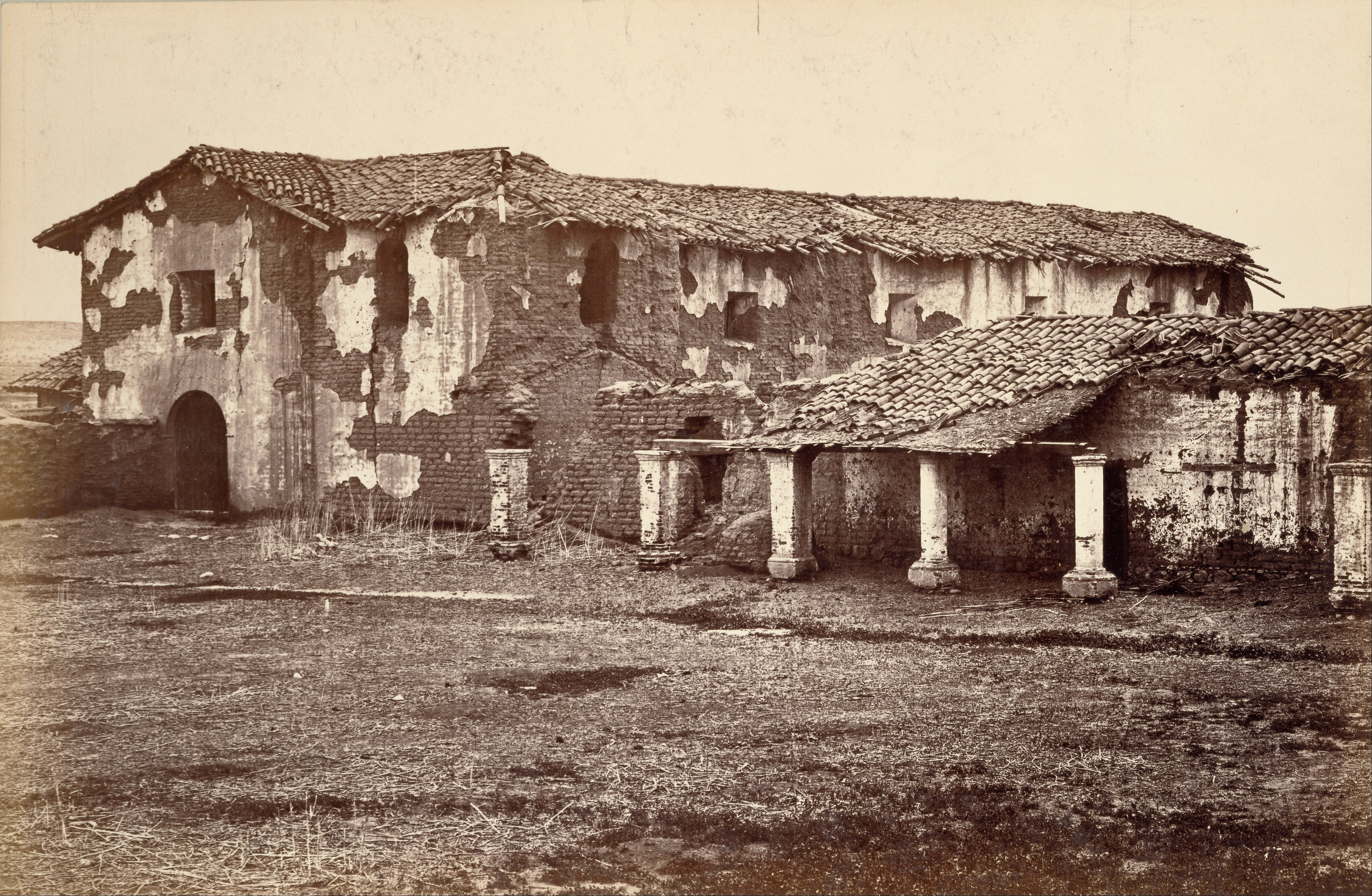
- Mission San Fernando Rey de España in a dilapidated state, c. 1885

- Location in the San Fernando Valley
- Location: 15151 San Fernando Mission Blvd. Los Angeles, California 91345
- Coordinates: 34.2731°N 118.4612°W
- Name as founded: La Misión del Señor Fernando, Rey de España
- English translation: The Mission of Saint Ferdinand, King of Spain
- Patron: Ferdinand III of Castile
- Nickname: "Mission of the Valley"
- Founded: September 8, 1797
- Founded by: Father Fermín Lasuén
- Founding Order: Seventeenth
- Military district: Second
- Native tribe: Tataviam, Tongva; Fernandeño, Gabrieleño
- Native place name: 'Achooykomenga, Pasheeknga
- Baptisms: 2,784 (Note: As of December 31, 1832; information adapted from Engelhardt's Missions and Missionaries of California.)
- Marriages: 827
- Burials: 1,983
- Secularized: 1834 (Rancho Ex-Mission San Fernando)
- Returned to the Church: 1861
- Governing body: Roman Catholic Archdiocese of Los Angeles
- Current use: Chapel-of-ease/Museum

U.S. National Register of Historic Places
- Designated: 1971
- Delisted: 1974
- Reference no.: 71001076

U.S. National Register of Historic Places
- Designated: October 27, 1988
- Reference no.: 88002147

California Historical Landmark
- Reference no.: #157

Los Angeles Historic-Cultural Monument
- Reference no.: 23

Mission San Fernando Rey de España is a Spanish mission in the Mission Hills community of Los Angeles, California. The mission was founded on September 8, 1797 at the site of Achooykomenga, and was the seventeenth of the twenty-one Spanish missions established in Alta California. Named for Saint Ferdinand, the mission is the namesake of the nearby city of San Fernando and the San Fernando Valley.

The mission was secularized in 1834 and returned to the Catholic Church in 1861; it became a working church in 1920. Today the mission grounds function as a museum; the church is a chapel of ease of the Archdiocese of Los Angeles.

== History ==
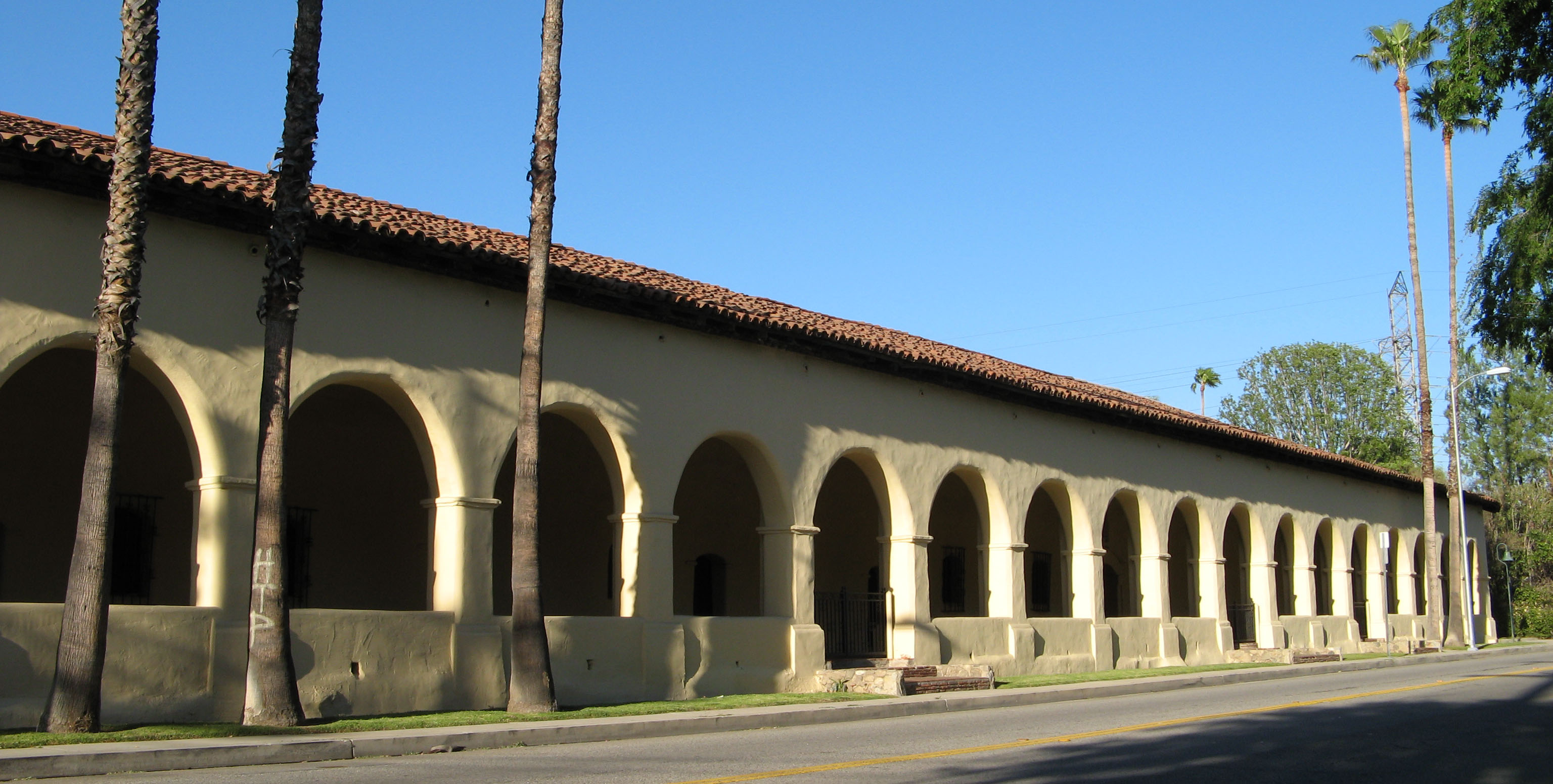
An exterior view of the Convento

In 1769, the Spanish Portolà expedition – the first Europeans to see inland areas of California – traveled north through the San Fernando Valley. On August 7 they camped at a watering place near where the mission would later be established. Fray Juan Crespí, a Franciscan missionary travelling with the expedition, noted in his diary that the camp was "at the foot of the mountains".

=== Founding ===
Mission San Fernando Rey de España was the 17th of 21 Franciscan missions established in Alta California. The Rancho of Francisco Reyes (then the Alcalde of the Pueblo de Los Ángeles), which included the agricultural settlement of Achooykomenga worked by Ventureño Chumash, Fernandeño (Tongva), and Tataviam laborers, was approved by the padres as a suitable site for the Mission. After brief negotiations with the Alcalde, the land was acquired (Mission records list Reyes as godfather to the first infant baptized at San Fernando).

The mission was founded on September 8, 1797 by Father Fermín Lasuén who, with the assistance of Fray Francisco Dumetz and in the presence of troops and natives, performed the ceremonies and dedicated the mission to San Fernando Rey de España, making it the fourth mission site he had established; ten children were baptized on the first day. Fray Francisco Dumetz and his associate Fray Francisco Javier Uría labored in the mission until after 1800.

Early in October 1797, 13 adults were baptised and the first marriage took place on October 8. At the end of the year, there were 55 neophytes. By 1800, there were 310 neophytes, 352 baptisms, and 70 deaths.

The mission church was finished months after its establishment and the first baptism recorded to have occurred in the church was on November 28, 1797. The first church was an 8 vara (22 feet) long adobe structure; within two years, the church was too small for services and a second 23 by 7¼ vara (63 by 20 feet) adobe church was built which served the mission for five more years.

=== 1800s ===
In 1801, a 106 vara (291 feet) addition to the workshops was built and formed the south wing of the workshop courtyard; it included two granaries which became wine and aguardiente factories, two small rooms for missionaries, a weaving room, and a dormitory with a small courtyard for neophyte girls and single women. Six adjoining houses of unreported dimensions were built as a single structure directly northwest of the church which were assigned as a cuartel; they contained a storeroom, barracks, a kitchen, and a house containing a reception room and along with two other rooms.

The mission workshops' courtyard was closed into a square in 1802 with the addition of a 100 vara (275 ft.) east wing addition which contained another granary, a flour mill, candle factory and a carpentry shop.

Fray Dumetz left the mission in April 1802, then returned in 1804. Construction on the third church began in 1804 and Spanish carpenter Manuel Gutiérrez, who was active in the mission from 1805 to 1806, is considered the church architect; the church along with its sacristy and carpentry, cart, and plow shops formed the full approximately 133 vara (365.75 ft.) north wing. Construction of about seventy adobe rooms for indigenous neophytes, arranged in the shape of a U, and located southwest of the convento, also began in 1804 as well as a detached tallow vat attached to the northeast corner of the quadrangle and a detached row of adobe and stone buildings running north and south to the south of the quadrangle. This last row of buildings contained olive and grain storerooms, horse stables, a tannery and a soap factory or tallow vat called a jabonería.

In 1805, Fray Dumetz left the mission along with Fray Uría who left the country and Fray Nicolás Lázaro and Fray José María Zalvidea arrived at the mission; the latter was transferred to San Gabriel in 1806. Prior to the completion of the church in 1806, the bell tower was built adjacent to the church and was integrated into the workshop quadrangle's west wing. The new 60 by 14 vara (165 by 38 feet) adobe and tile-roofed church was blessed on December 6, 1806, by Fray Pedro Muñoz from Mission San Miguel Arcángel.

Fray Zalvidea died at San Diego in August 1807 and padres José Antonio Uría and Pedro Muñoz arrived the same year; the former retired in November 1808 and was succeeded by Fray Martín de Landaeta while Fray José Antonio Urresti arrived in 1809 and became the associate of Fray Muñoz. Fray Landaeta died in 1816.

During the first decade of the century, the neophyte population increased from 310 to 955, there had been 797 deaths, and 1468 baptisms. The largest number of baptisms in any one year was 361 in 1803.

In 1804 there was a land controversy where the padres successfully protested against the granting of the Rancho Camulos to Francisco Ávila.

=== 1810s ===
By the 1810s with the onset of the Mexican War of Independence as well as the conflict with France in Spain, support of the missions by the Spanish government largely disappeared and the missions had to largely fend for themselves and soldier's wages were no longer being paid; this caused economic pressures that led to a decline in the quality of life and productivity of the mission communities.

A convento building to house the friars began to be constructed in 1810 and was written about in the friar's annual report at the end of the year. Little is known about this initial structure's dimensions and exact location. The master carpenter Salvador Carabantes was employed to work on the convento as early as February 1811 and he continued to work at the mission until his death in February 1813. The building continued to be expanded whenever materials and resources were available into the next decade.

Fray Urresti died in 1812 and was succeeded by Fray Joaquín Pascual Nuez in 1812 to 1814, Fray Vincente Pascual Oliva was stationed in the mission from 1814 to 1815. Fray Pedro Muñoz left California in 1817, and his place was taken by Fray Marcos Antonio de Vitoria from 1818 to 1820. Fray Ramón Ulibarri arrived in January and Fray Francisco González de Ibarra in October 1820. On December 21, 1812, an earthquake hit the area which caused enough damage to necessitate the introduction of 20 new beams to support the church wall. Before 1818, a new chapel was completed. In 1818, another jabonería was built in the detached buildings south of the quadrangle with two boilers and holes to accept firewood, this is the only jabonería left in modern times and is still visible in Brand Park. In the period of 1810 to 1820 the population increased slightly, reaching its highest figure, 1,080, in 1819, after which its decline began.

The soldiers' unpaid wages were being supplanted by supplies and food produced in the missions which put further pressure on the neophyte indigenous labor force. The neophytes faced an increase in abuses and the insufficient harvests led to starvation which pushed more and more of them to flee the missions.

=== 1820s ===
After Fray Ulibarri died in 1821, Fray Francisco González de Ibarra was stationed alone in the mission. Ibarra wrote letters to the commander of the troops complaining of the starvation caused by the soldiers' demands.

=== Beginning of the Mexican era ===
After the Mexican Empire gained independence from Spain on September 27, 1821, the province of Alta California became the Mexican Territory of Alta California. The missions continued under the rule of Mexico.

Fray Ibarra began to complain that the soldiers of his guard were causing problems by selling liquor and lending horses to the natives and in 1825, he declared that "the presidio was a curse rather than a help to the mission, that the soldiers should go to work and raise grain, and not live on the toil of the Indians, whom they robbed and deceived with talk of liberty while in reality they treated them as slaves." This led to a sharp reply from Captain Guerra, who advised the Padre to modify his tone. The amount of supplies furnished by the mission to the presidio from 1822 to April 1827 amounted to $21,203.

=== 1830s and secularization ===
Governor José Figeroa officially secularized the mission in October 1834, Comisionado Teniente Antonio del Valle took charge of the mission estates by inventory from Fray Ibarra. From then, the mission was to be a parish of the second class with a $1000 salary. Lieutenant del Valle became the mission mayordomo on May 29, 1835. Fray Ibarra opposed the appointment of del Valle as mayordomo. After secularization, many of the former neophytes returned to their lands while others remained to work at the ranches near the mission in return for low wages and some shelter.

The Mexican government had planned to send all Spanish-born friars back to Spain; however, Fray Ibarra was allowed to stay at the mission and he continued his labors alone until the middle of 1835 when he retired to Mexico. His successor was Fray Pedro Cabot from San Antonio who was stationed until his death in October 1836. Anastasio Carrillo succeeded Lieutenant Antonio del Valle as mayordomo on January 3, 1837.

After Fray Cabot's death, there is no mention of a missionary at San Fernando until August 1838 when Fray Blas Ordaz remained there during the rest of the decade. Fray Ordaz was the last resident Franciscan in the mission and remained as the mission curate until June 30, 1847. Down to 1834, the neophyte population decreased by less than 100 and the mission remained productive.

In 1842, six years before the California Gold Rush, a brother of the mission mayordomo made the first Alta California gold discovery in the foothills near the mission. In memory of that discovery, the place was given the name Placerita Canyon, but only small quantities of gold were found.

In 1845, Governor Pío Pico declared the Mission buildings for sale under the secularization act of 1833 and, in 1846, turned the mission into the headquarters of the Rancho Ex-Mission San Fernando.

Fray Ordaz took charge of Mission San Gabriel, but would occasionally return to perform religious services until February 1849. The secularization's requirement of a diocesan replacement of the regular clergy was met on May 28, 1848, when Reverend José M. Rosales officially took charge of the mission, allowing it to become another secular curato of Alta California; however, the mission settlement was not replaced with a pueblo as the mission buildings had been turned into the property of the private rancho and could no longer be used to establish a settlement. The former convento became a storage room and living quarters for rancho workers and the mission buildings were neglected.

=== Later history ===
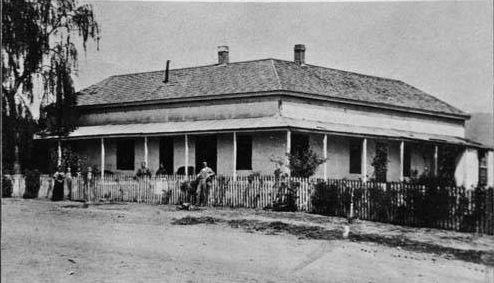
Lopez Station in the 1860s

The Mission was used in a number of ways during the late 19th century: north of the mission was the site of Lopez Station for the Butterfield Stage Lines; it served as a warehouse for the Porter Land and Water Company; and in 1896, the quadrangle was used as a hog farm. In 1861, the Mission buildings and 75 acres of land were returned to the church after Charles Fletcher Lummis acted for preservation. The buildings were disintegrating as beams, tiles and nails were taken from the church by settlers. San Fernando's church became a working church again in 1923 when the Oblate priests arrived. Many attempts were made to restore the old Mission from the early 20th century, but it was not until the Hearst Foundation gave a large gift of money in the 1940s, that the Mission was finally restored. The museum became the repository for heirlooms of the Mexican church evacuated during the Cristero revolt, and also holds part of the Doheny library. The church was listed on the National Register of Historic Places in 1971, but was extensively damaged by the 1971 San Fernando earthquake, and was completely rebuilt. Repairs were completed in 1974. It continues to be very well cared for and is still used as a chapel-of-ease. The Convento Building was separately listed on the Register in 1988. In 2003, comedian Bob Hope, a late-life convert to Catholicism, was interred in the Bob Hope Memorial Gardens; followed by his widow Dolores Hope in 2011.

== Mission industries ==
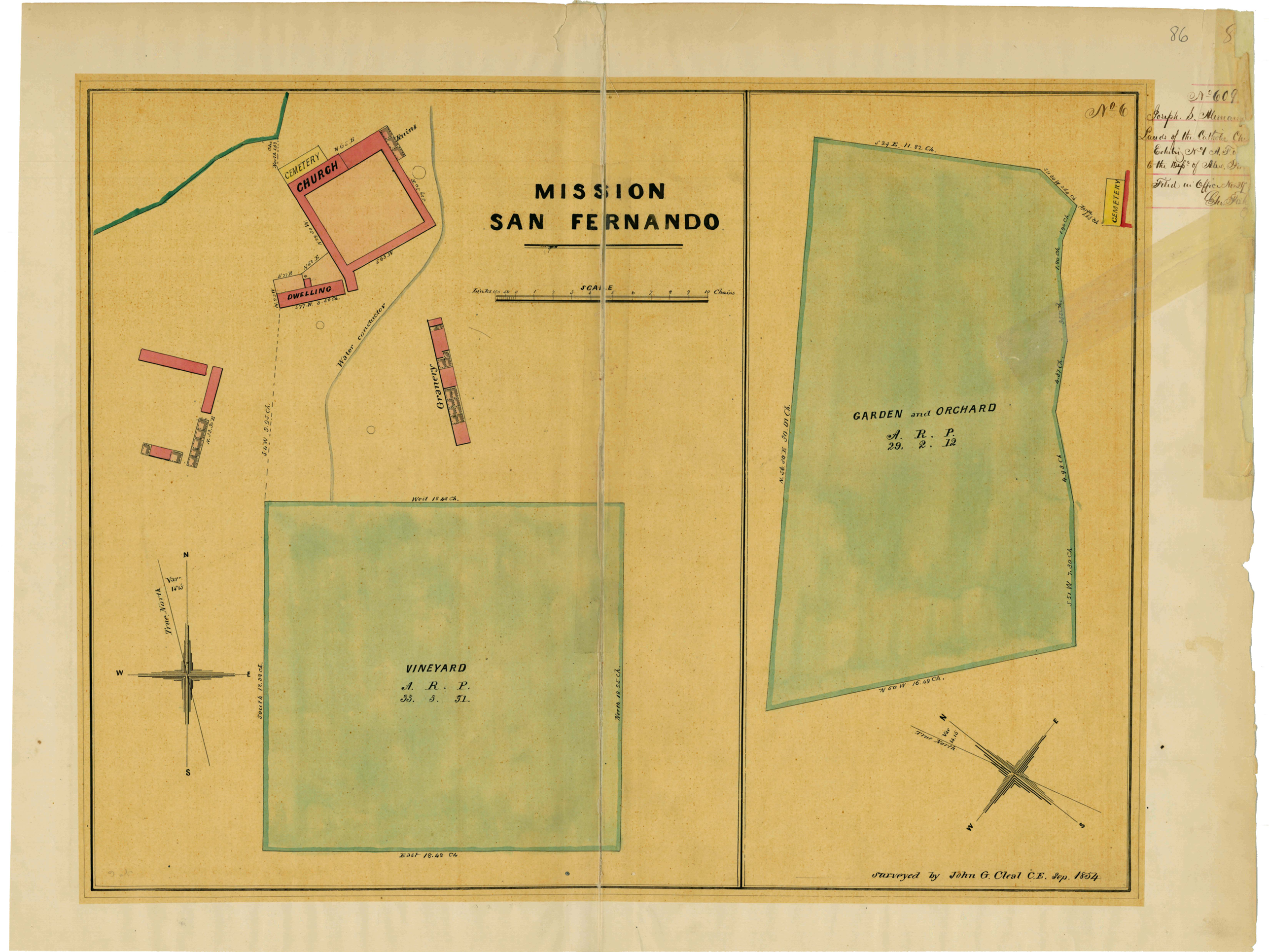
Map of Mission San Fernando land claimed by the Roman Catholic Church in 1854; survey depicts the church, cemetery, residence, granary, vineyard, "garden and orchard" and a "water conductor," possibly a zanja

The goals of the missions were, first, to spread the message of Christianity and, second, to establish a Spanish colony. Because of the difficulty of delivering supplies by sea, the missions had to become self-sufficient in relatively short order. Toward that end, neophytes were taught European-style farming, animal husbandry, mechanical arts and domestic crafts like tallow candle making.

The San Fernando Mission was known for having good quality wines and around the mission walls there were over 32,000 grapevines from which the neophytes produced wine; at the peak of its production, the mission produced about 2,000 gallons of wine and 2,000 gallons of aguardiente. The mission also contained about 70 acres of olive trees which were collected and crushed to make olive oil. The men of the mission community spent their days working in the fields or in the mission workshops and buildings; they were charged with tending to the cattle, horses and sheep as well as growing wheat, barley, peas, beans, corn, figs, and peaches. The women were charged with weaving in the workrooms to produce the cloth used in the mission. Sundays and holy days were dedicated to rest and prayer.

== Mission bells ==
Bells were vitally important to daily life at any mission. The bells were rung at mealtimes, to call the Mission residents to work and to religious services, during births and funerals, to signal the approach of a ship or returning missionary, and at other times; novices were instructed in the intricate rituals associated with the ringing the mission bell. The residents as referred to above were called neophytes (Indigenous persons) after baptism. There were five bells at the mission from 1769 to 1931.

A hundred-pound bell was unearthed in an orange grove near the Mission in 1920. It carried the following inscription (translated from Russian): "In the Year 1796, in the month of January, this bell was cast on the Island of Kodiak by the blessing of Archimandrite Joaseph, during the sojourn of Alexsandr Baranov." It is not known how this Russian Orthodox artifact from Kodiak, Alaska made its way to a Catholic mission in Southern California.

== Gallery ==
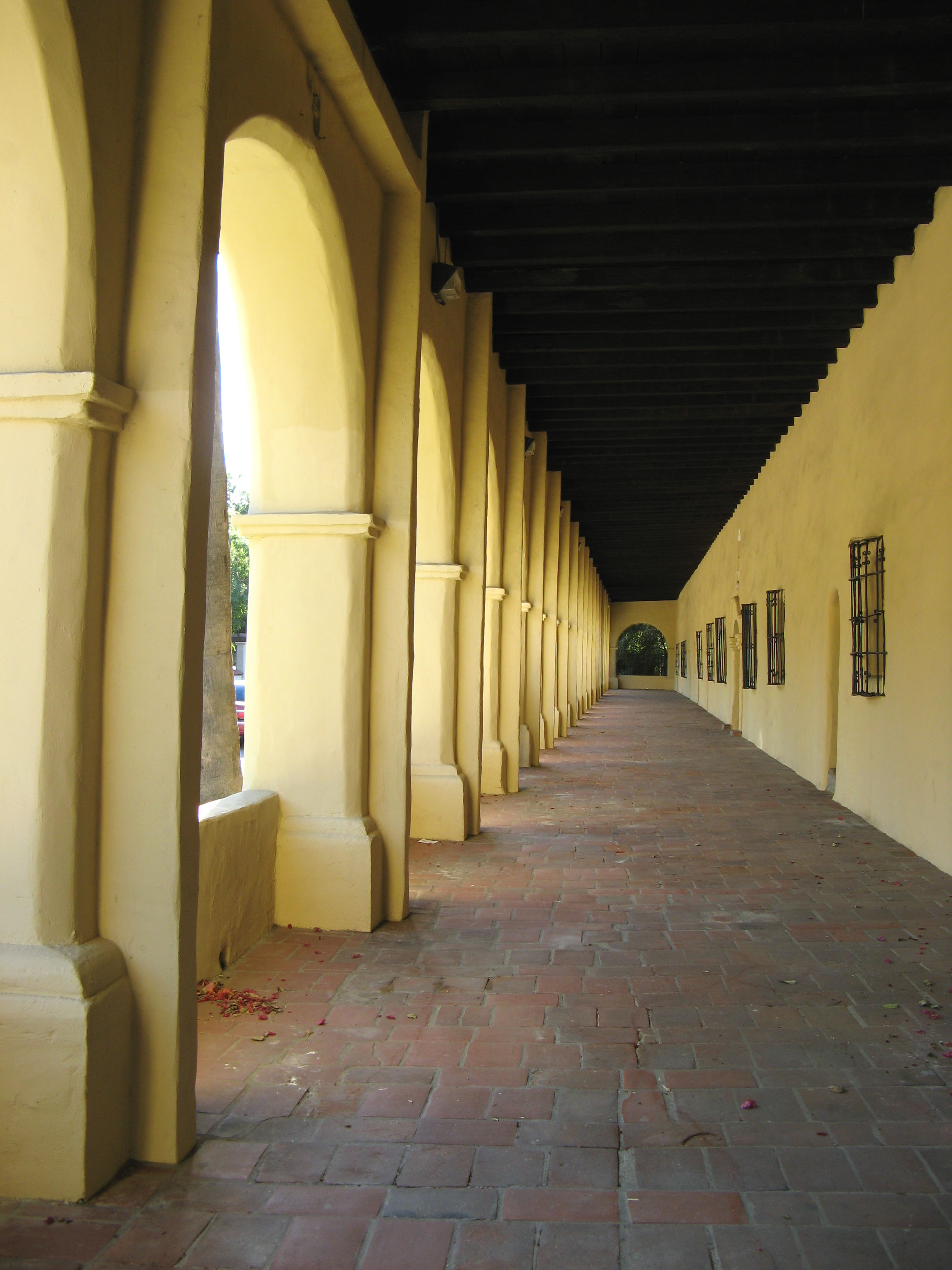
A view looking down an exterior corridor at Mission San Fernando Rey de España, a common architectural feature of the Spanish Missions

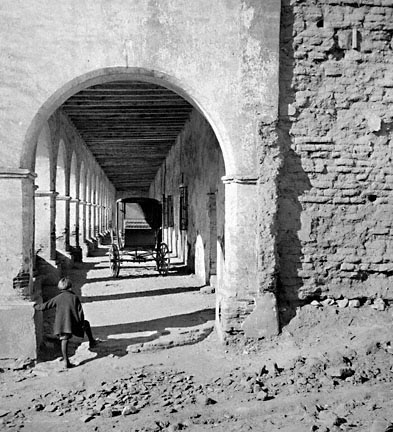
A view of the same colonnade as at left, c. 1900

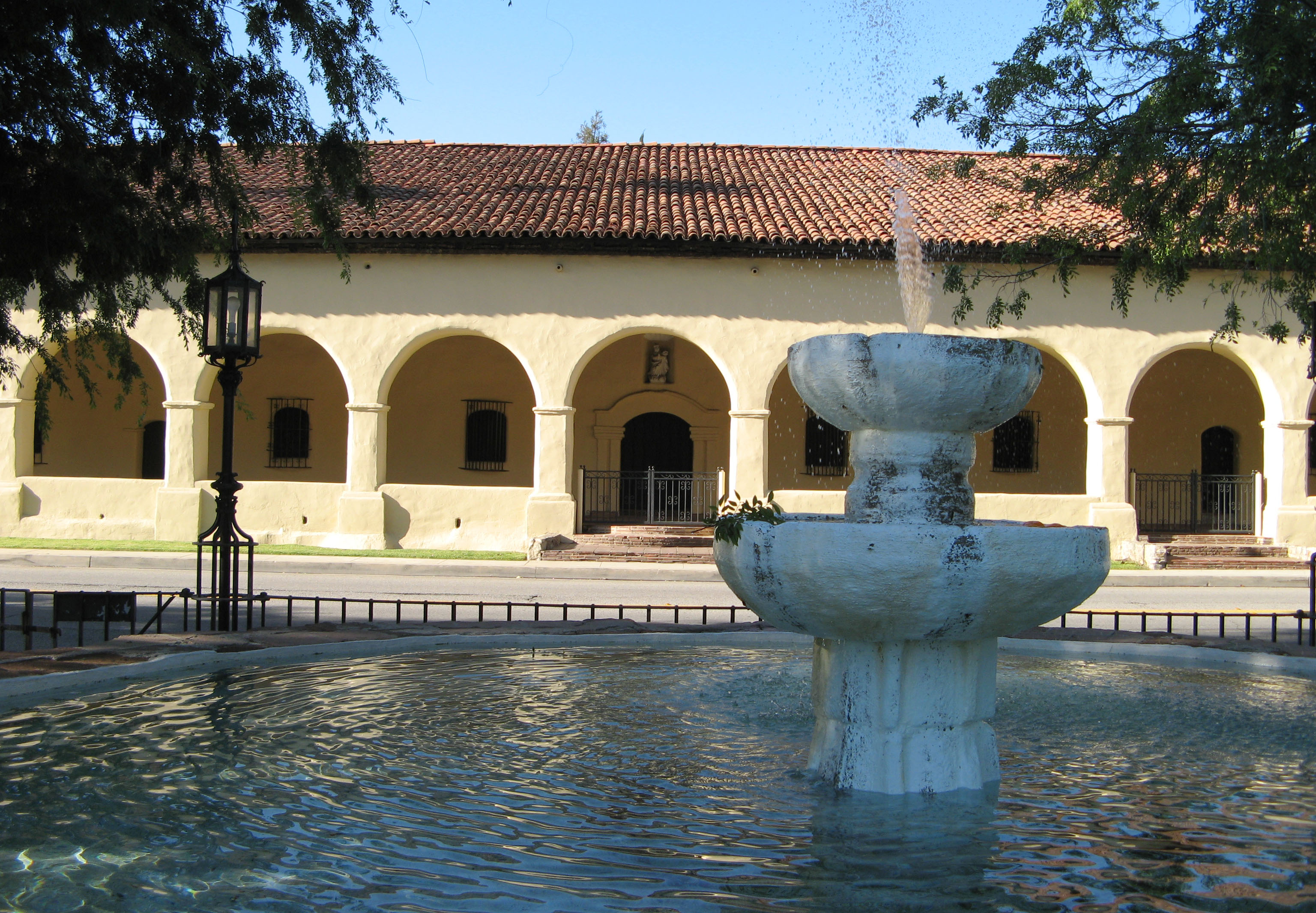
The fountain opposite San Fernando Mission Boulevard

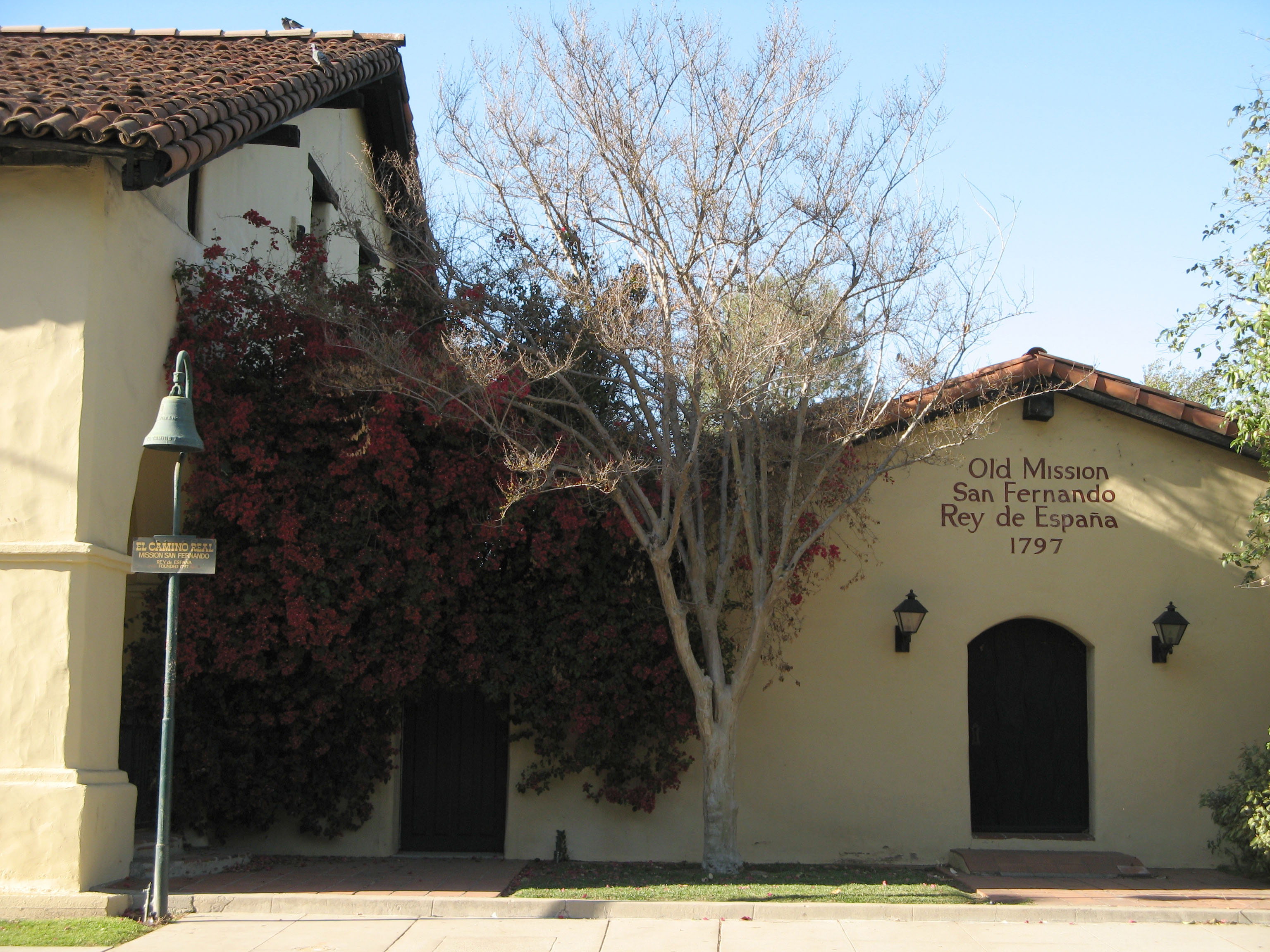
The present-day Mission façade

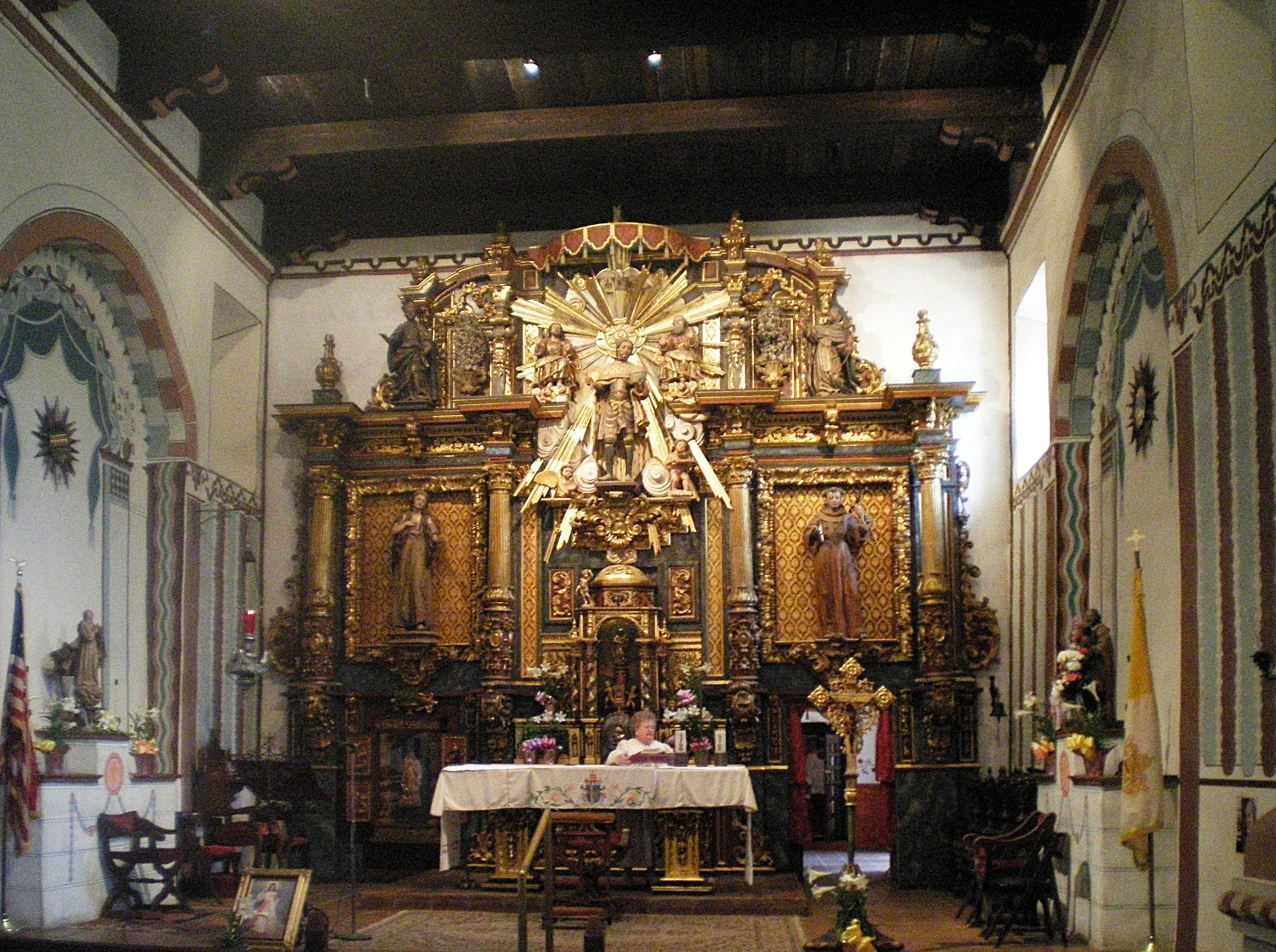
San Fernando Mission Church interior

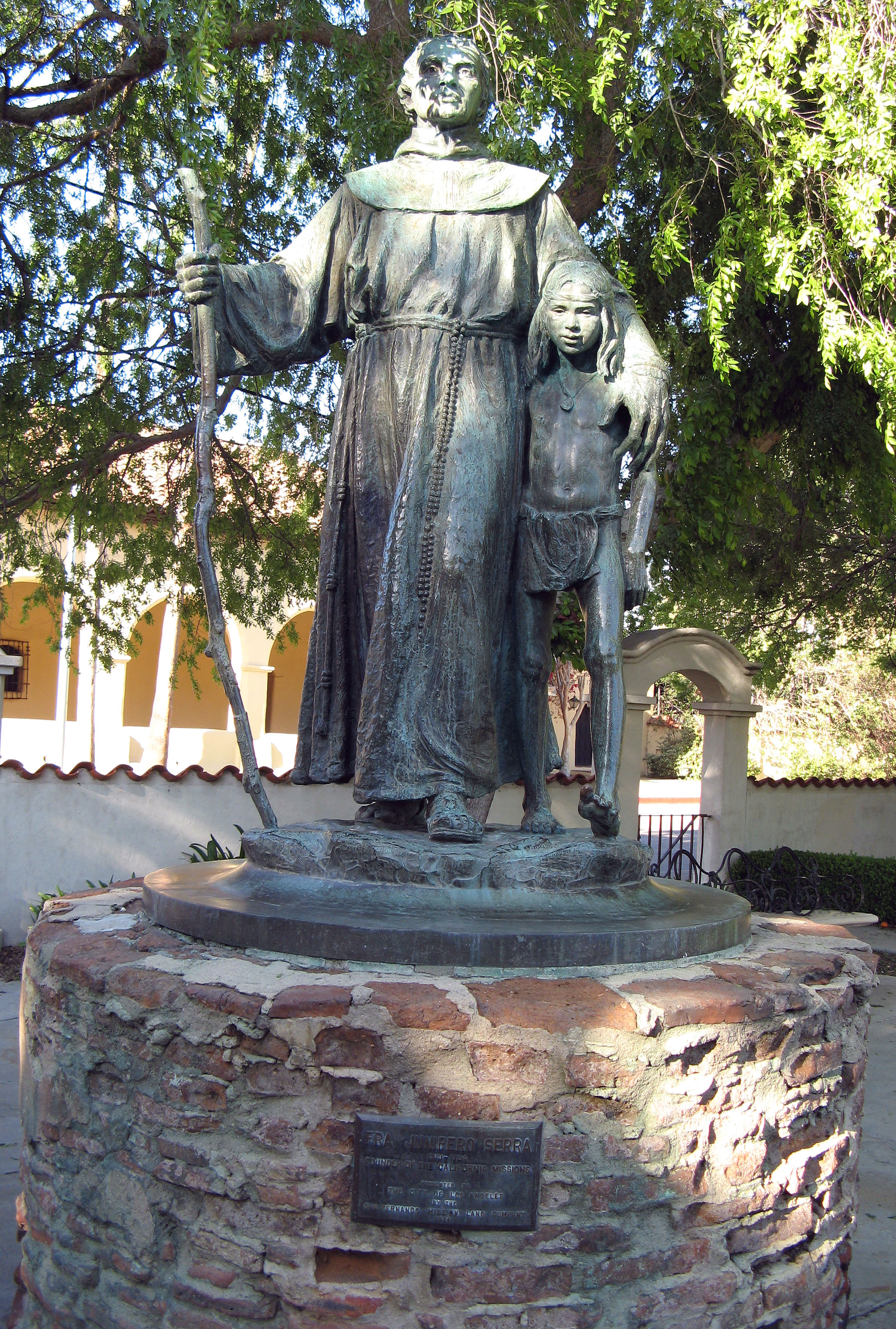
A statue of Saint Father Junípero Serra and a native child at Mission San Fernando

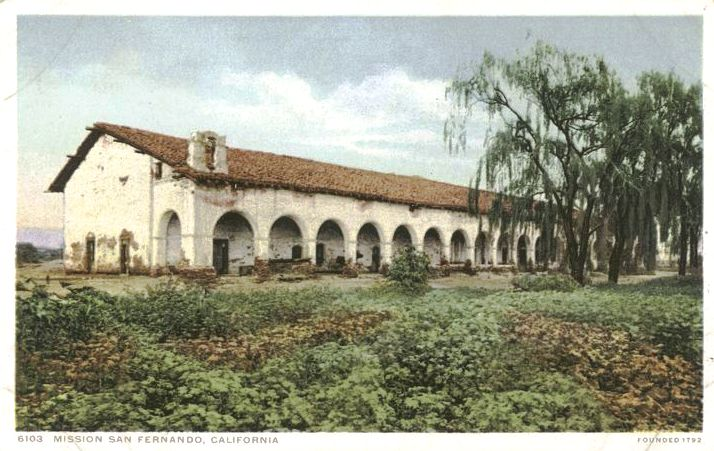
Mission San Fernando Postcard, c. 1900

== See also ==
- Convento Building (Mission San Fernando)
- List of Spanish missions in California
- List of Los Angeles Historic-Cultural Monuments in the San Fernando Valley
- Rancho Ex-Mission San Fernando
- San Fernando Mission Cemetery
- Spanish missions in California
- USNS Mission San Fernando (AO-122) – a Mission Buenaventura (AO‑111) Class fleet oiler built during World War I
- Casa De San Pedro served mission in past
- Chatsworth Calera owned by mission in past

== Bibliography ==
- Bancroft, Hubert Howe (1886). History of California. History Company.
- Ching, Jacqueline (2003). Mission San Fernando Rey de España. The Missions of California. New York, New York: Rosen Publishing Group's PowerKids Press. ISBN 978-0-8239-5893-1 – via Internet Archive.
- Engelhardt, Zephyrin (1897). The Franciscans in California. The Missions and Missionaries of California. Harbor Springs, MI: Holy Childhood Indian School.
- Engelhardt, Zephyrin (1922). San Juan Capistrano Mission. The Missions and Missionaries of California. Los Angeles, CA: Standard Printing Company.
- Forbes, Alexander (1839). California: A History of Upper and Lower California. Cornhill, London: Smith, Elder and Company – via Internet Archive.
- Fedorova, Svetlana G. (1973). Donnelly, Alton S. (ed.). The Russian Population in Alaska and California: Late 18th Century – 1867. Translated by Pierce, Richard A. Kingston, Ontario: Limestone Press. ISBN 0-919642-53-5.
- Jones, Terry L.; Klar, Kathryn A., eds. (2007). California Prehistory: Colonization, Culture, and Complexity. Landham, MD: Altimira Press. ISBN 978-0-7591-0872-1.
- Krell, Dorothy, ed. (1979). The California Missions: A Pictorial History. Menlo Park, CA: Sunset Publishing Corporation. ISBN 0-376-05172-8.
- Leffingwell, Randy (2005). California missions & presidios : the history & beauty of the Spanish missions. Internet Archive. Stillwater, MN : Voyageur Press. ISBN 978-0-89658-492-1.
- Paddison, Joshua, ed. (1999). A World Transformed: Firsthand Accounts of California Before the Gold Rush. Berkeley, CA: Heyday Books. ISBN 1-890771-13-9.
- Pauley, Kenneth E; Pauley, Carol M (2005). San Fernando, Rey de España: an illustrated history. Spokane: Arthur H. Clark Company. ISBN 978-0-87062-338-7.
- Ruscin, Terry (1999). Mission Memoirs. San Diego, CA: Sunbelt Publications. ISBN 0-932653-30-8.
- Wright, R. (1950). California's Missions. Arroyo Grande, CA: Hubert A. and Martha H. Lowman.
- Yenne, Bill (2004). The Missions of California. San Diego, CA: Thunder Bay Press. ISBN 1-59223-319-8.
- Young, S. & Levick, M. (1988). The Missions of California. San Francisco, CA: Chronicle Books LLC. ISBN 0-8118-3694-0.
- Rawls, James J. (1988). Indians of California. The changing image (2. printing ed.). Norman: University of Oklahoma Press. ISBN 978-0-8061-2020-1.
