= Chatsworth Calera =

- Location within the Los Angeles metropolitan area
- 34°14′5″N 118°17′31″W
- Location: Chatsworth, Los Angeles

California Historical Landmark
- Designated: June 27, 1977
- Reference no.: 911

Chatsworth Calera also called Chatsworth Reservoir Kiln Site is one of the few surviving structures of the early 1800s lime industry. This kiln marked the introduction to California of the European industrial process for vitrifying limestone building blocks which were used in the construction of the San Fernando mission and other mission buildings. The word "Calera" is Spanish for "limestone quarry" or "limekiln". Chatsworth Calera is now located in Chatsworth, Los Angeles, California. in the Chatsworth Nature Preserve. At its peak there may have been up to five kilns at the site run by native Indian laborers. Chatsworth Calera registered a California Historical Landmark No. 911.

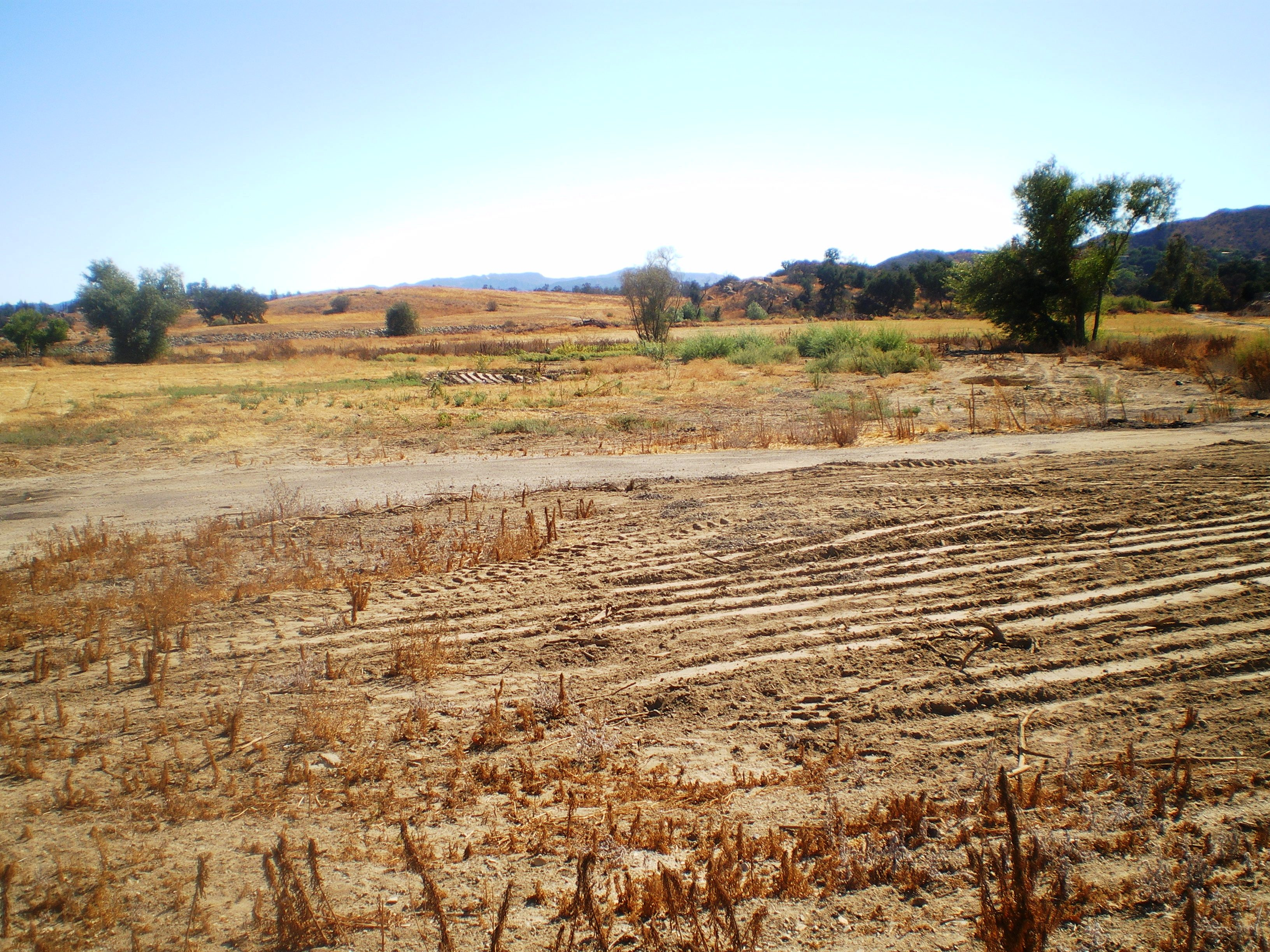
Chatsworth Reservoir Kiln Site

The Chatsworth Calera is also a Los Angeles Historic-Cultural Monument #141, thus designated on April 2, 1975, by the Los Angeles Cultural Heritage Commission. The Chatsworth Calera kiln was used for burning limestone in the making of lime for concrete, mortar, and whitewash, a step in the construction of bricks and tiles. The monument site now looks like a hole in the ground with walls of vitrified limestone and brick. The pit measures about fifteen feet deep and six and a half feet across. The kiln was in use during early California history (Spanish/Mission and Mexican periods). The area rich with oak trees and lime deposits was ideal for kiln operation. Several lime kilns were in operation around the edge of the San Fernando Valley in the past. The Location is near the intersection of Woolsey Canyon Road and Valley Circle Blvd in Chatsworth about 9022 Valley Circle Blvd, Chatsworth, CA 91311. The kiln can be seen today looking east at the intersection.

The ruins of the Chatsworth Calera came to public attention by environmental quality commissioner, Helen Treend, for the City of Los Angeles, . She learned about the kiln from Max Knapp a Chatsworth valley pioneer stonemason. William Warren Orcutt a geologist and paleontologist wrote about the limestone outcrops near his ranch Rancho Sombra del Roble. He believed these outcrops to be of especially good quality for lime production.

Two mile south of Chatsworth Calera is the Dayton Canyon Kilns.

== See also ==
- List of California Ranchos
- Ranchos of Los Angeles County, California
