= Brand Park Memory Garden =

Brand Park, Memory Garden
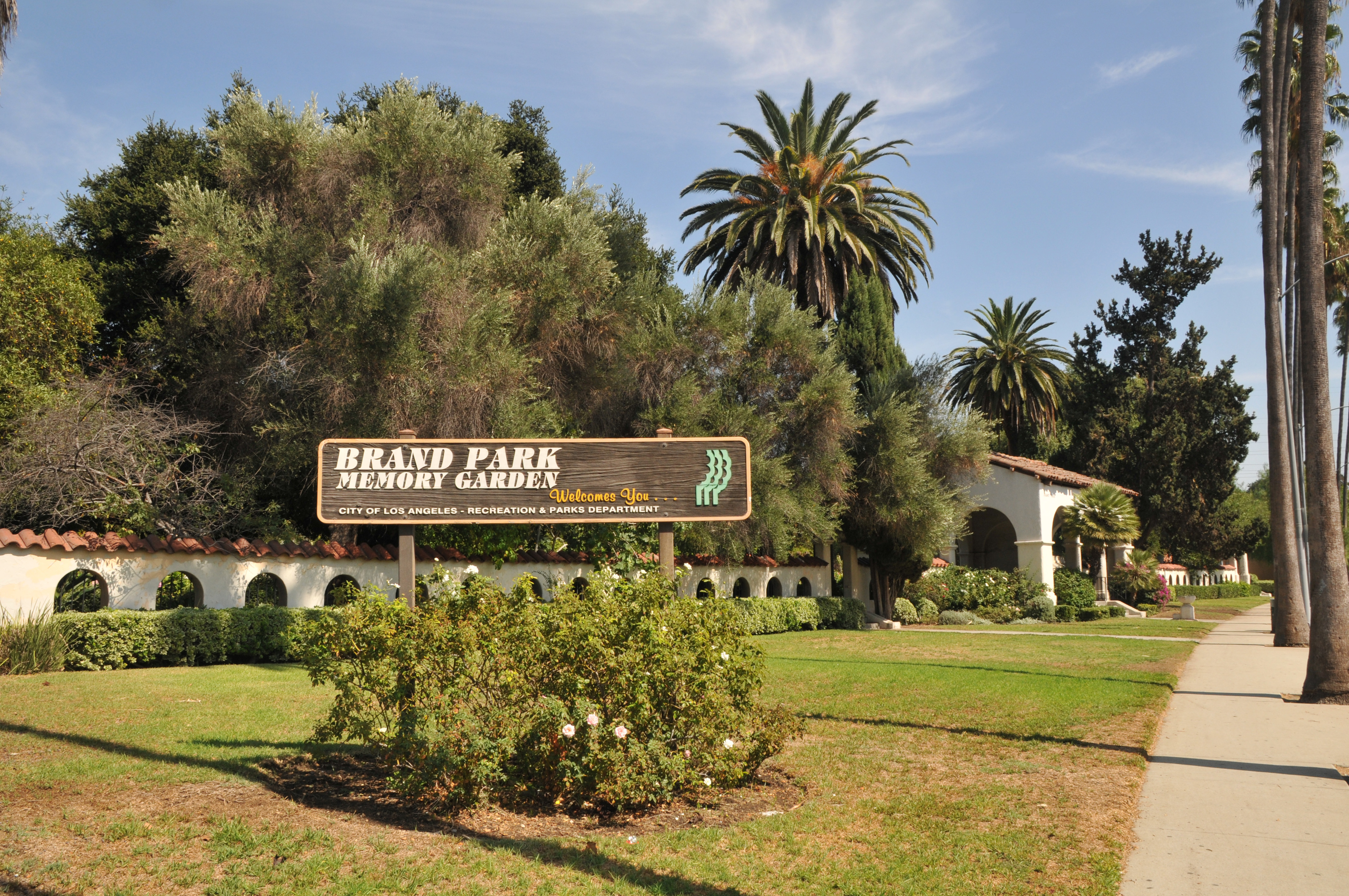
- Brand Park, Memory Garden

- Location within the Los Angeles metropolitan area
- 34°16′21″N 118°27′43″W
- Location: 15174 San Fernando Mission Blvd., Los Angeles, California

History
- Built: November 4, 1920

California Historical Landmark
- Designated: Jan. 11, 1935
- Reference no.: 150

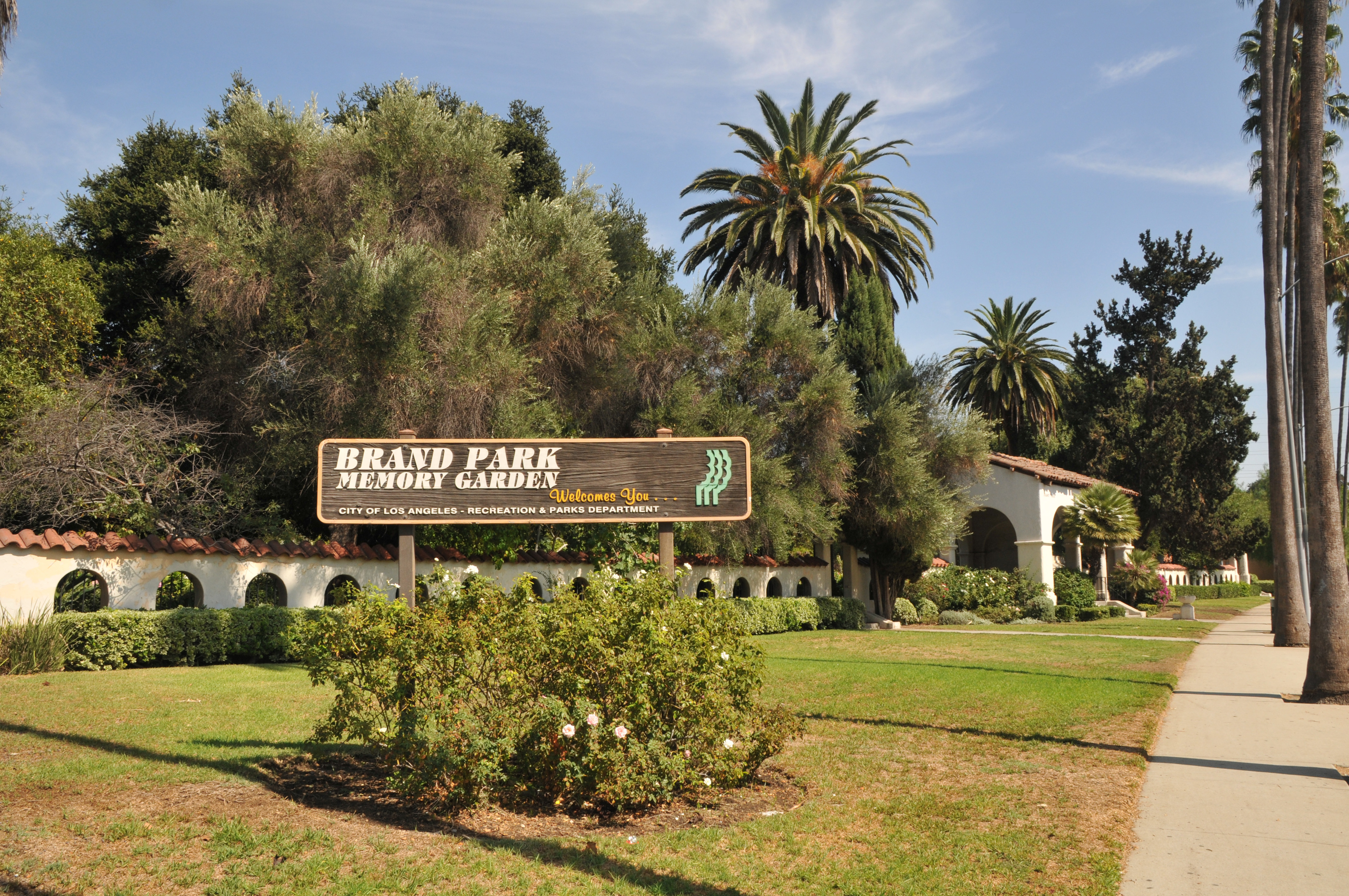
Brand Park Sign.

Brand Park is a recreation facility in Mission Hills, Los Angeles, California. It is located directly south of the Mission San Fernando Rey de España. Its western section contains the historic Brand Park Memory Garden along with the Brand Park Community Center which is used as a multi-purpose area for events. In its eastern section there are grass fields, two baseball diamonds, and a parking lot.

== History ==
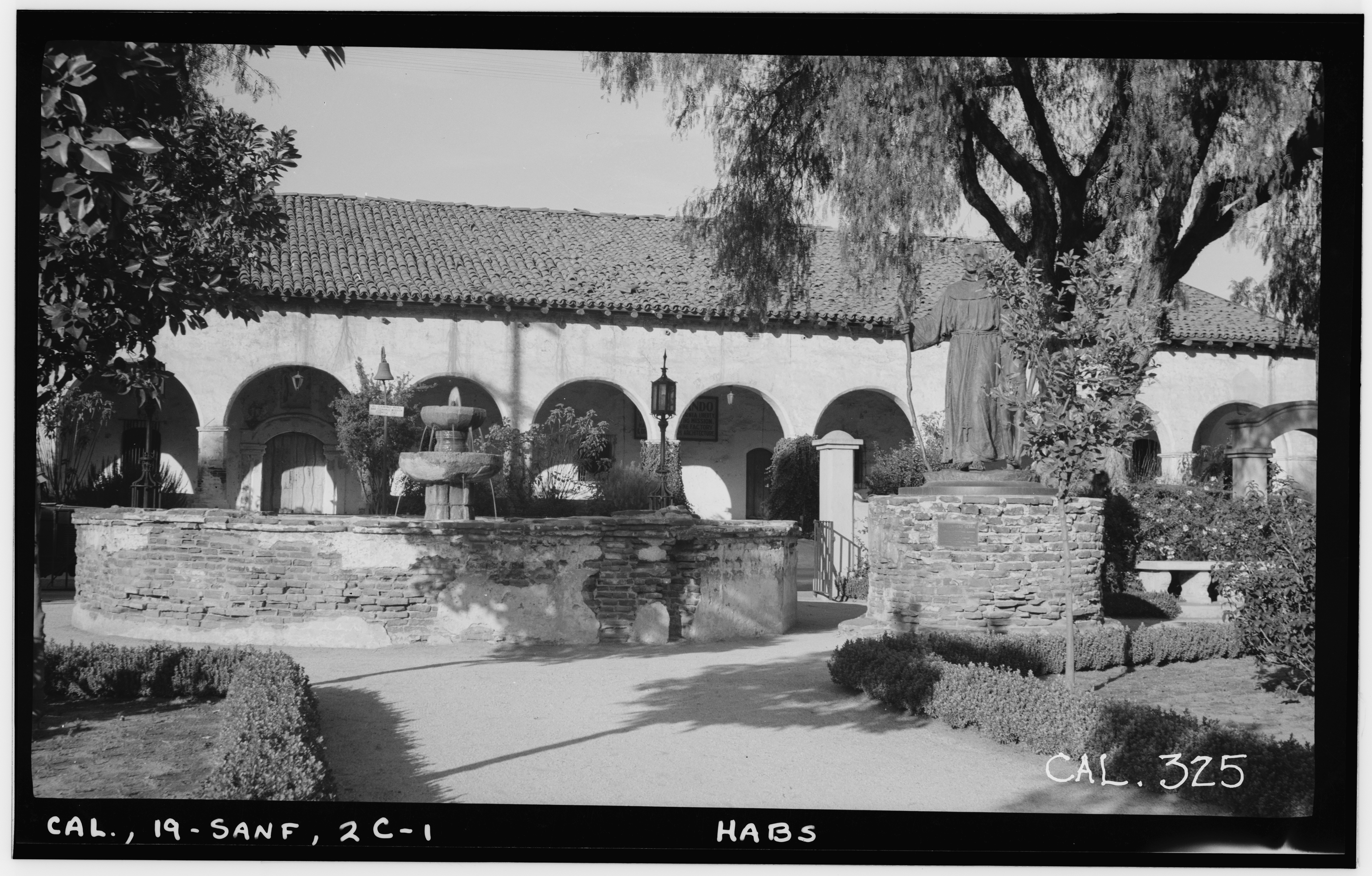
A photo of one of the fountains in Brand Park as well as the statue of Junípero Serra taken by Henry F. Withey in March 1936.

The park is named after Leslie Coombs Brand, a developer who owned property near the mission. He donated a portion of this land to the City of Los Angeles in 1920; this portion became Brand Park. The Brand Park Memory Garden was designated a California Historic Landmark (No. 150) on Jan. 11, 1935.

== Mission structures ==
Having been built on land that was part of Mission San Fernando, the park contains some structures that formed part of the mission complex in its western section.

=== Fountains ===
The Memory Garden contains two original mission-era brick fountains which once formed part of the mission's water supply system.

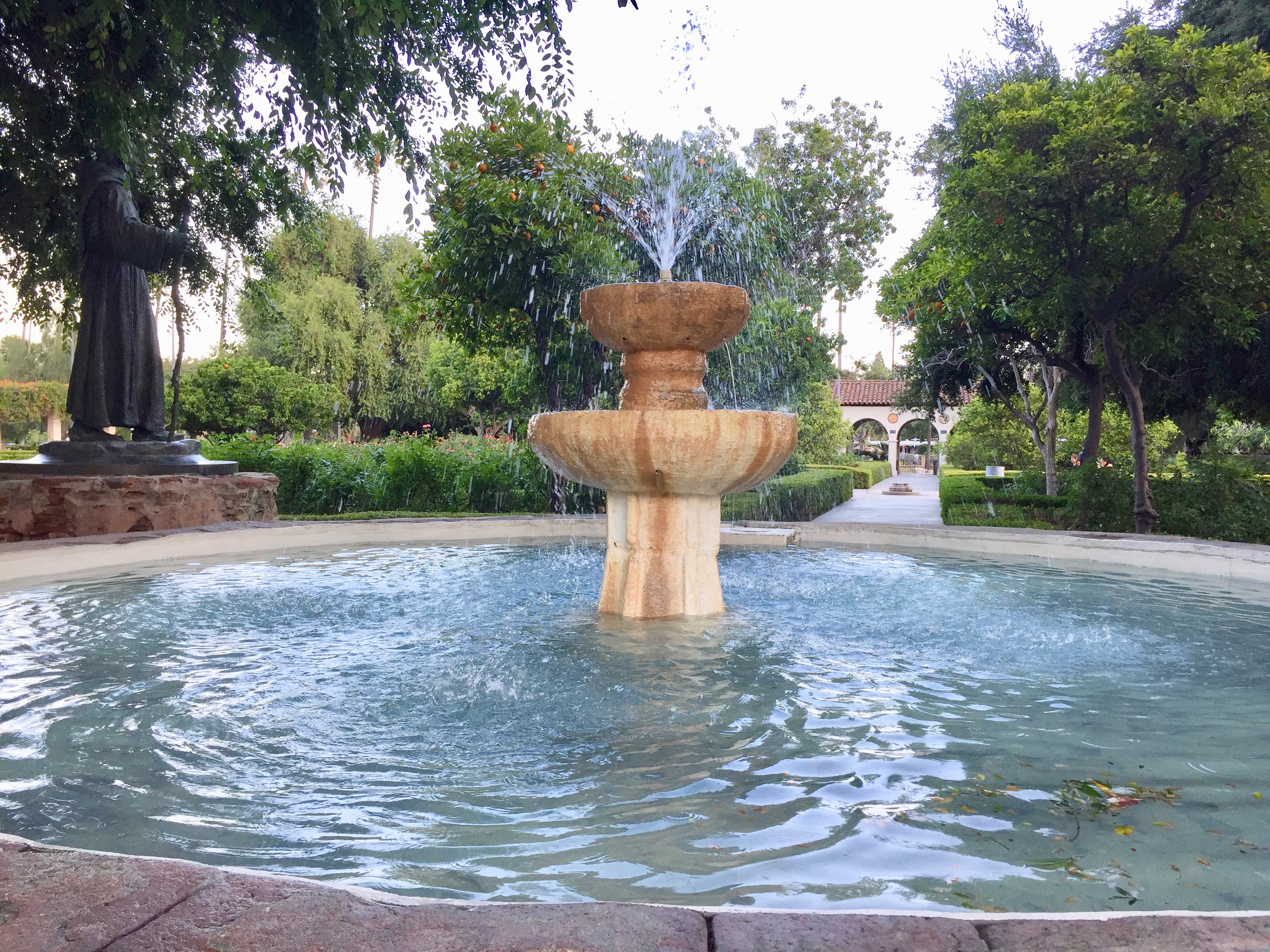
The 1811 fountain.

The fountain in the north of the garden is located 52 feet (16 m) from the steps of the convent's sala (main hall) and was built in 1811; the fountain has a basin which, while appearing circular, is a hexadecagon with a 22.5-foot (6.9 m) diameter and contains its original stone centerpiece. The fountains were once coated with thick lime plaster, but this has deteriorated revealing the underlying brick structure. The cylindrical brick structure located a few feet from this fountain is actually a small basin which served as a cooler for aguardiente, which in the missions was brandy; this structure was filled-in and used as a pedestal for a 1925 statue of Junípero Serra by Sally James Farnham until the statue's removal in June, 2020, following years of protests by indigenous groups.

==== Cordova fountain ====
The fountain in the west of the garden is called the Cordova or Rosette fountain dates to 1813, coinciding with the completion of the convent's arcade. The fountain, originally a pool without the more recently added stone centerpiece, has a basin in the shape of a barbed octofoil rosette, called a Moorish star by Kurt Baer, typical of the Mudéjar style; (Note: Also called "Moorish" in some texts.) It is the only example of an original California mission fountain with a basin in this style. It is said to be a replica of a fountain in the city of Córdoba, known for its Moorish and Mudéjar architecture.

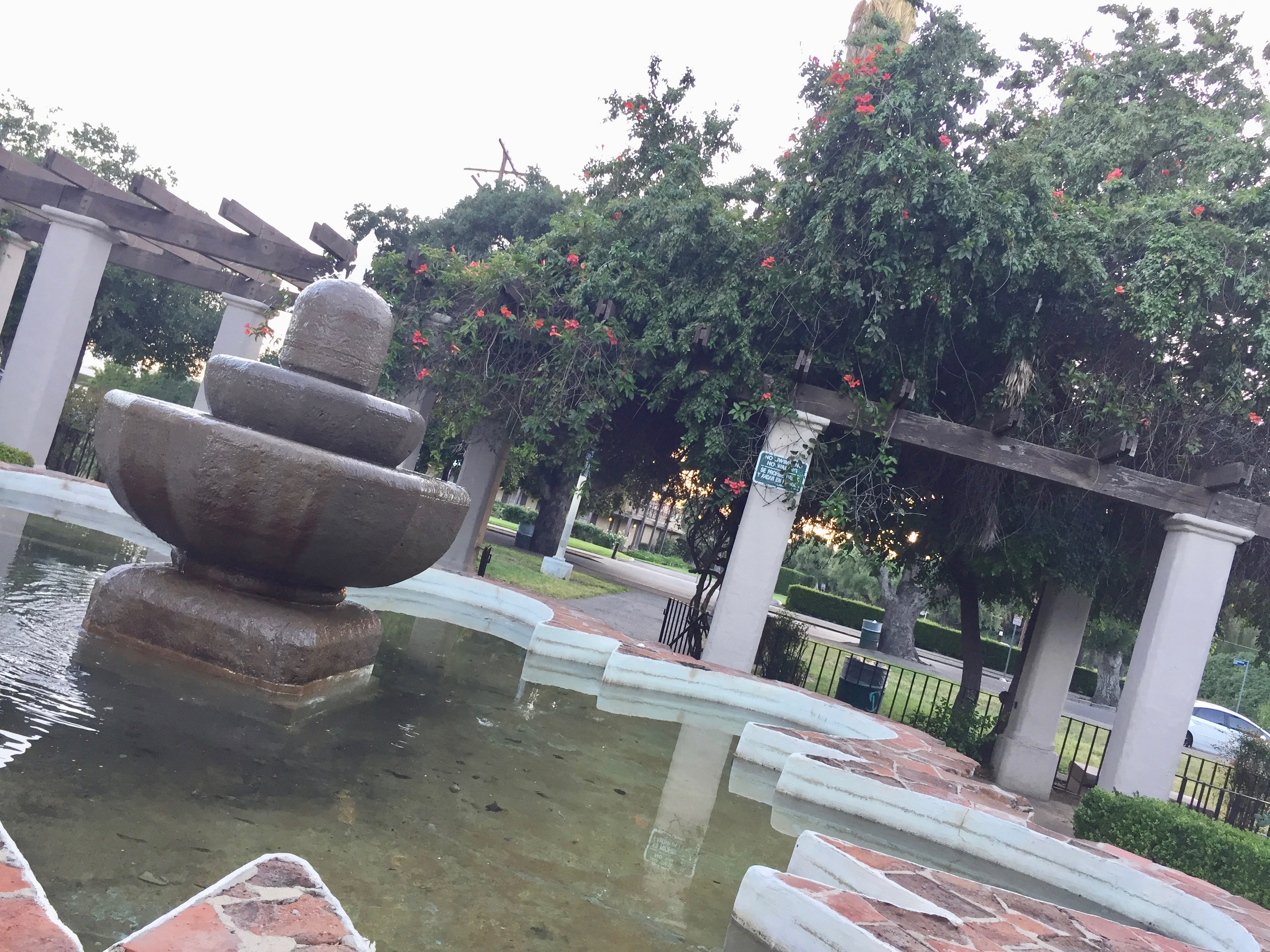
The Cordova fountain.

It was originally located 600–700 feet (180–210 m) south of the convent in the now residential area south of the park. In 1921, Leslie Brand had the Cordova fountain moved 500 feet (150 m) from its original location to where it is now. Journalist, activist, and preservationist Charles Fletcher Lummis pushed for the protection of the Cordova fountain during its relocation and insisted that it be moved in one piece.

I promptly started in to photograph that extraordinary fountain while Hunt began prospecting to find out how deep the foundations were, and got Charlie Britton and others with pick and spade to go down to it. And in his occasionally brash way he told them that it was all right to take the fountain to pieces and rebuild it in the new place. I heard this from under the focusing cloth, and promptly advised him "where to head in"-that no 2 bricks of the fountain will be pulled apart while I live; if the fountain is moved at all it will be as a solid entity.

— Charles Fletcher Lummis, Lummis diary, September 7, 1921

The fountain was excavated and then carried on timbers in its entirety to its new location, 160 feet (49 m) from the convent; Shortly after its relocation, a stone centerpiece was added similar to the one in the previously mentioned fountain. It was dedicated on July 4, 1922 with speeches from dignitaries including Brand himself. In 1962, this fountain's design was replicated to replace the one built in the mission quadrangle in the 1940's.

=== Jabonería ===
North of the Community Center are the two stone boilers of a jabonería (soap works) dating to 1818. The factory once lied at the north-east end of a 462-foot (141 m) long adobe building, built in 1804, which contained various workshops and storerooms and horse stables; the building had been repurposed as a granary before eventually being destroyed. The jabonería boilers are the only structure left of this row of buildings and is the only remaining jabonería of Mission San Fernando.

== State marker ==
- NO. 150 BRAND PARK (MEMORY GARDEN) - Brand Park, also called Memory Garden, was given to the city for a park November 4, 1920. It is a part of the original land grant of Mission San Fernando de Rey de España, and the colorful and picturesque atmosphere of the early California missions is preserved in Memory Garden.

== Gallery ==
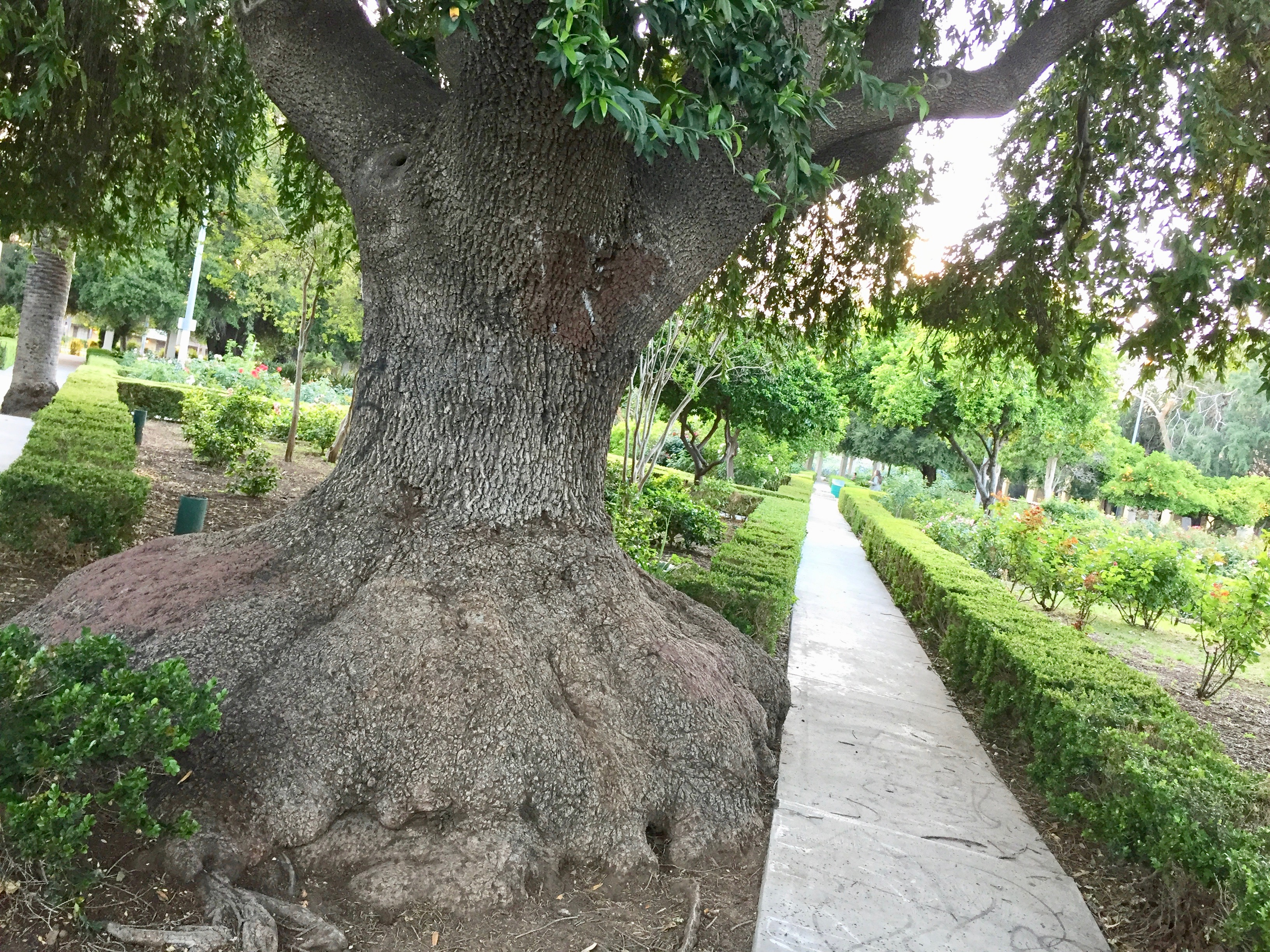

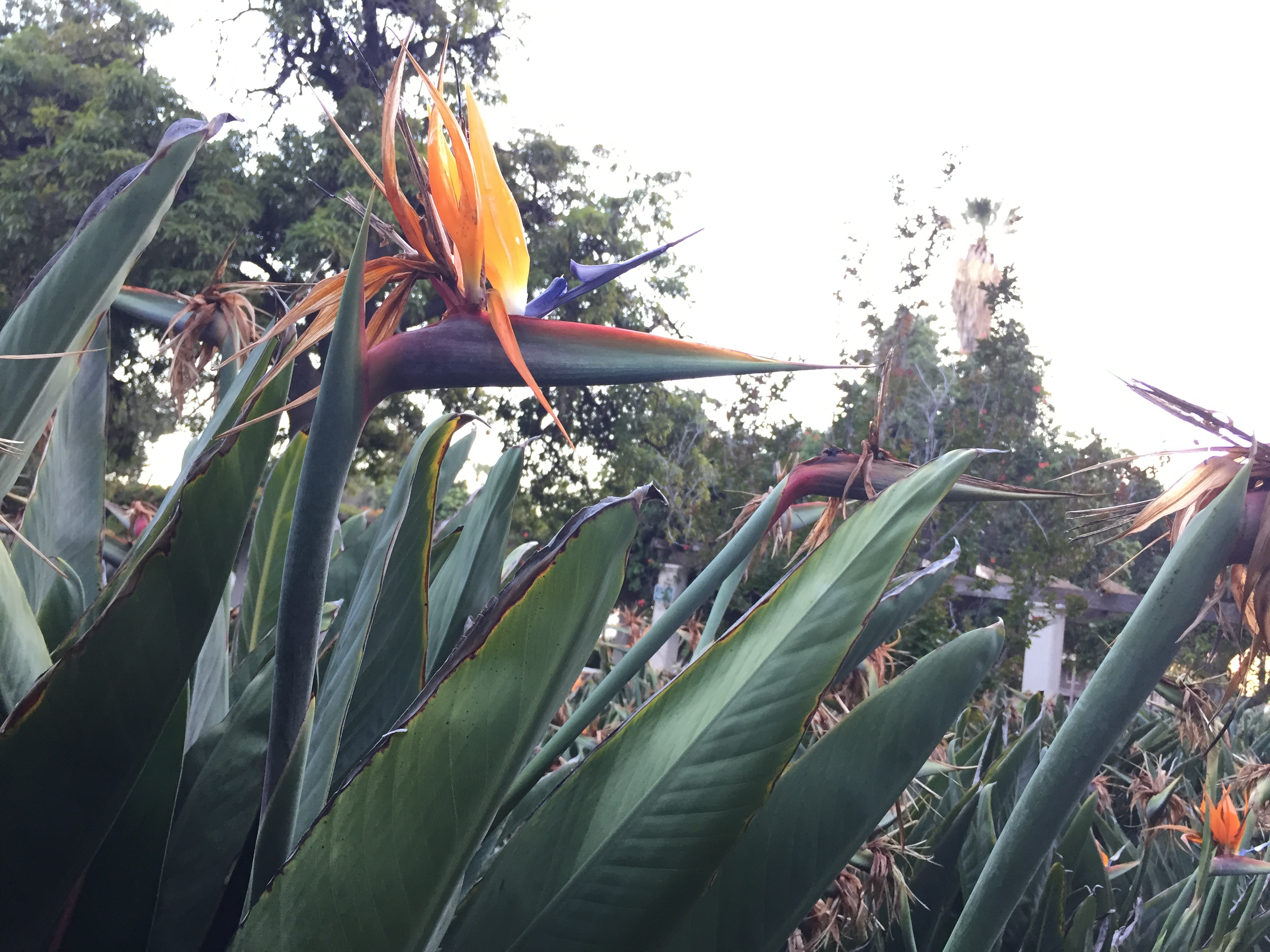

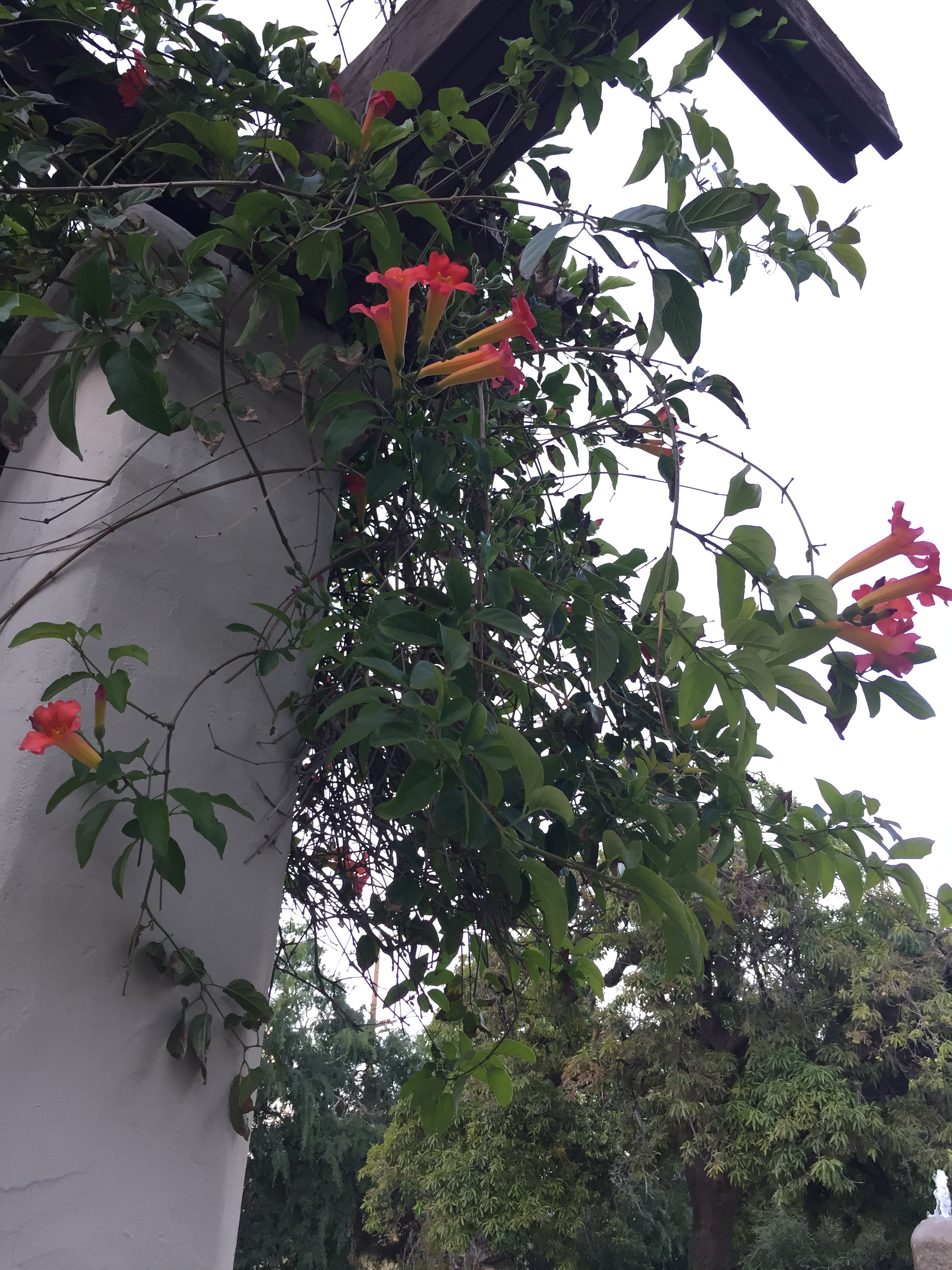

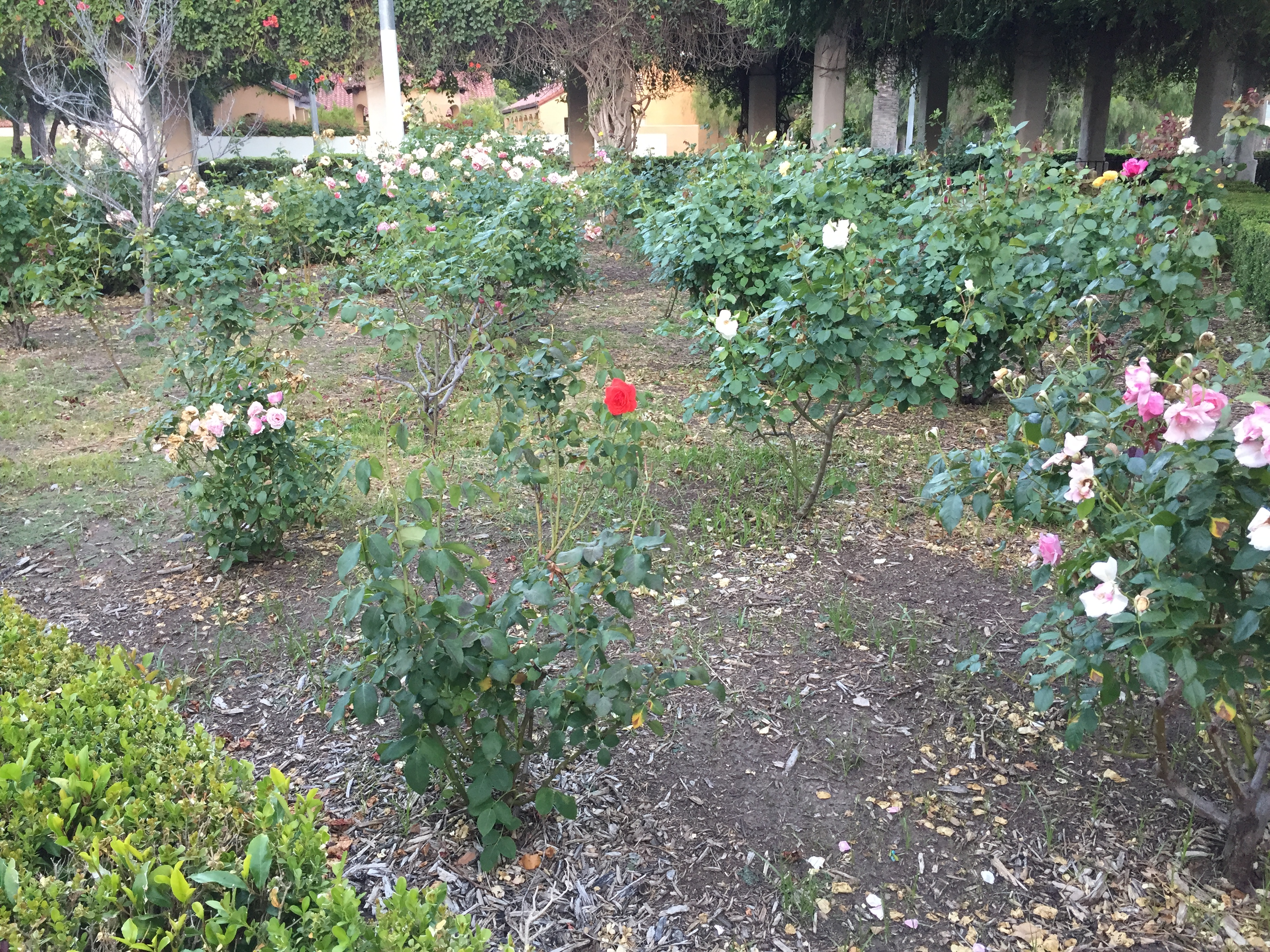

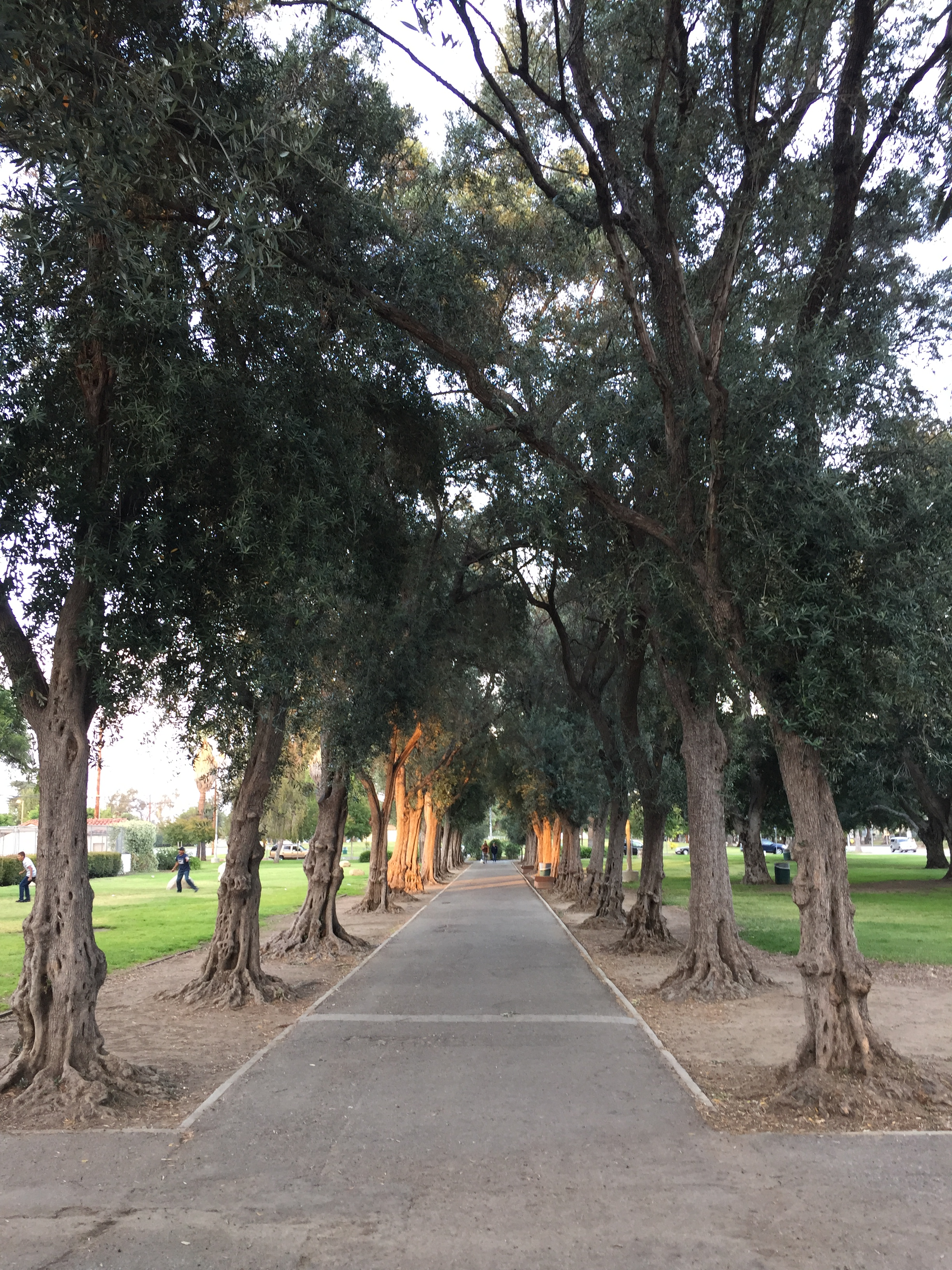

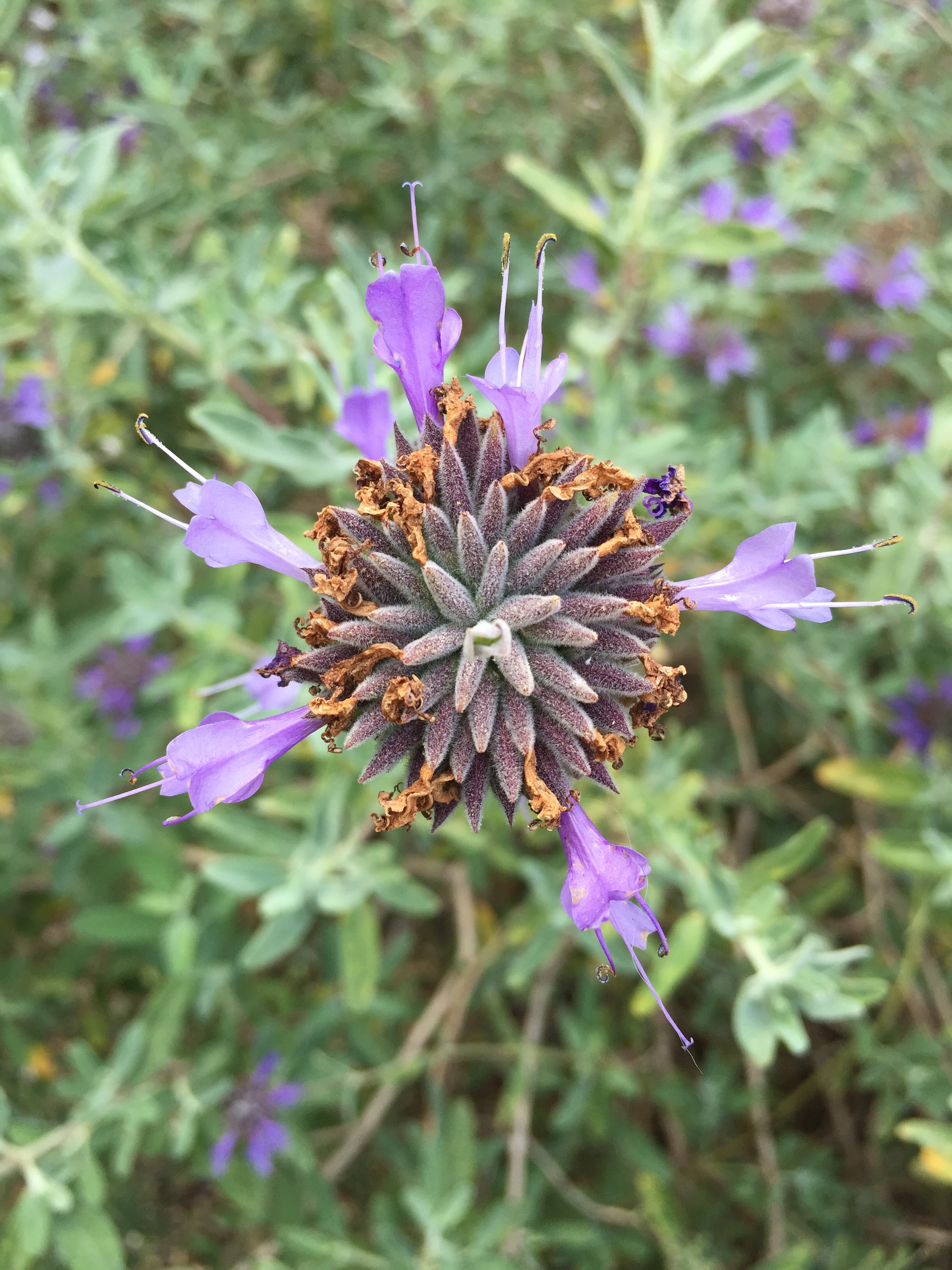

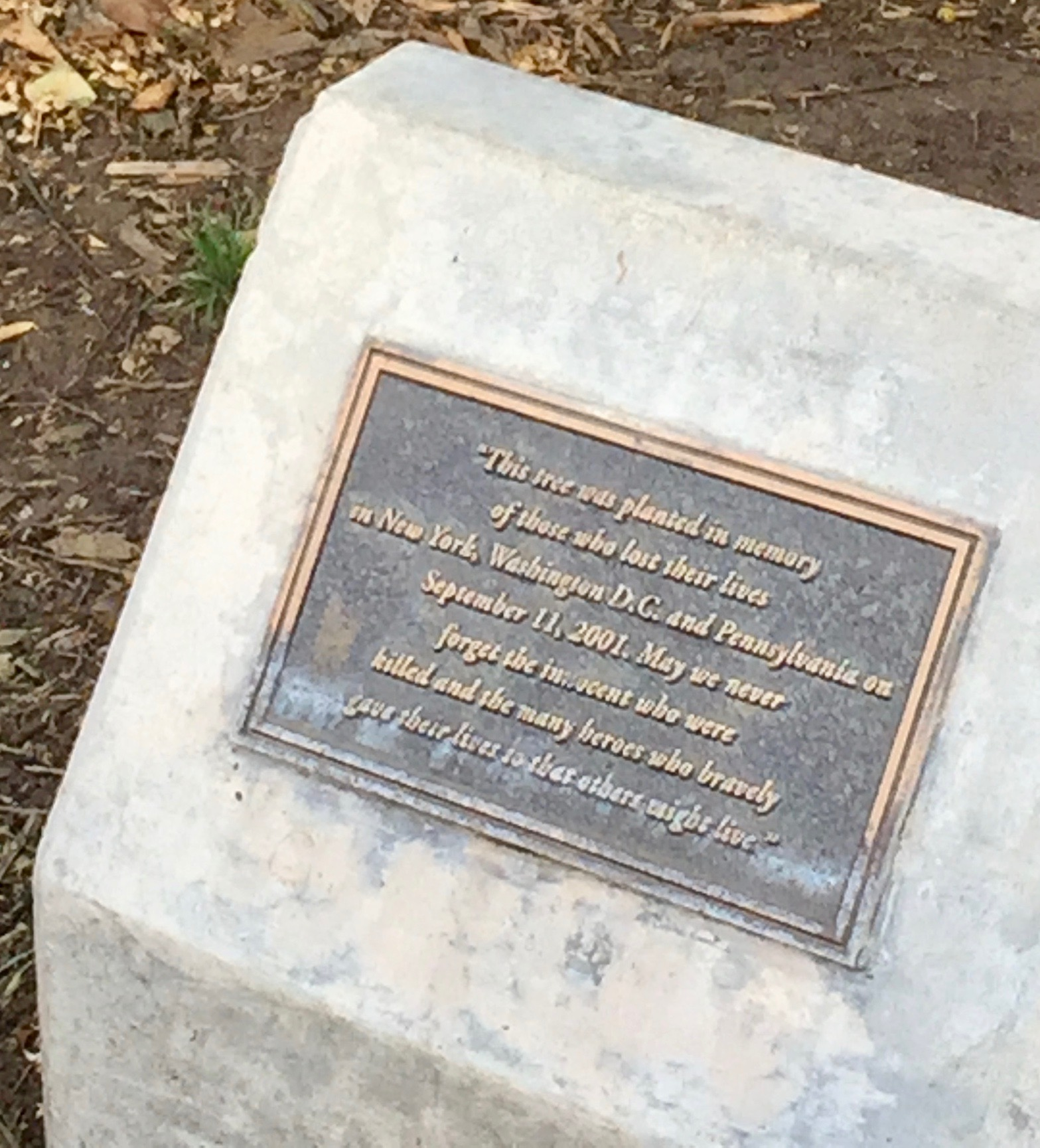

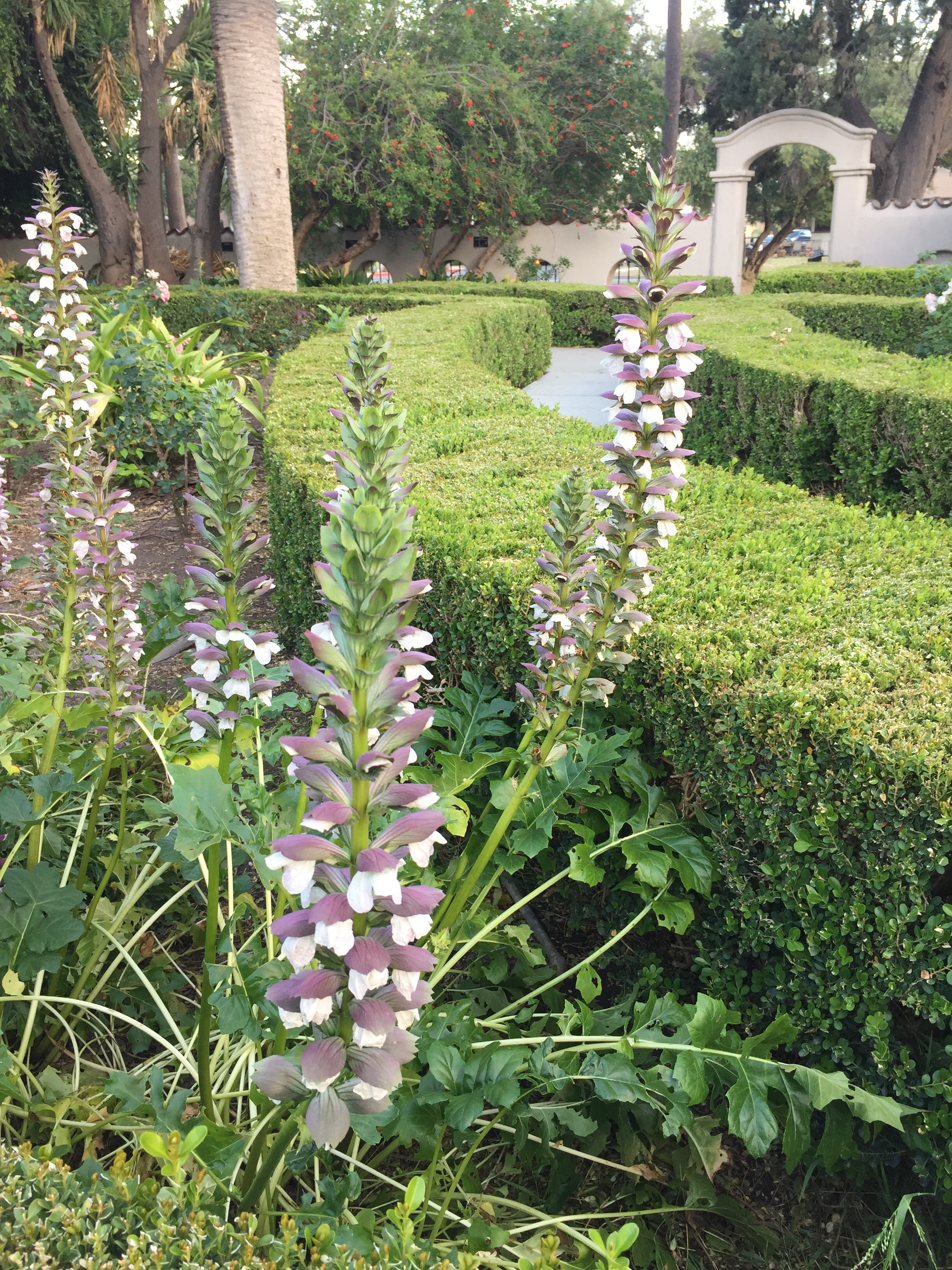

== Bibliography ==
- Pauley, Kenneth E; Pauley, Carol M (2005). San Fernando, Rey de España: an illustrated history. Spokane: Arthur H. Clark Company. ISBN 978-0-87062-338-7 – via Internet Archive.
