= Casler =

Casler is a surname. Notable people with the surname include:

- Florence Casler (1869–1954), Canadian-American real estate developer and contractor
- Herman Casler (1867–1939), American inventor
