= Garment Capitol Building =

- U.S. National Register of Historic Places
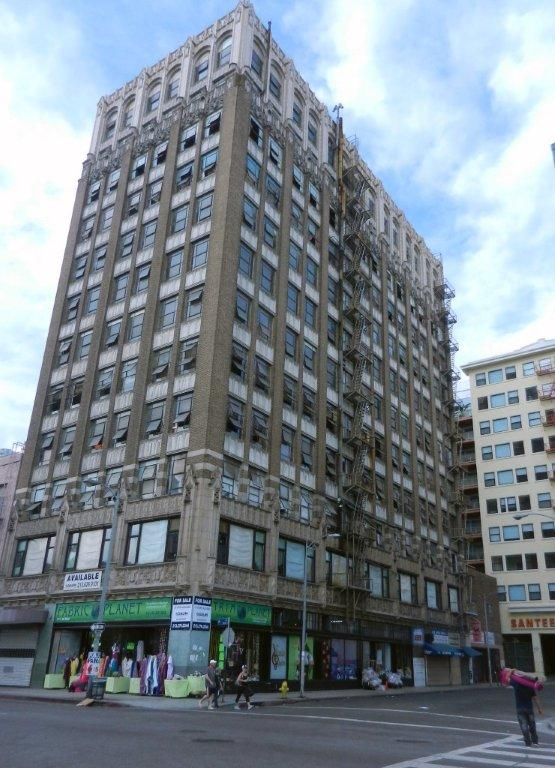
- The Garment Capitol Building in 2012

- Location within California Location within the United States
- Location: 217 E. 8th St., Los Angeles
- Coordinates: 34°2′30″N 118°15′2″W
- Area: 0.2 acres (0.081 ha)
- Built: 1926
- Architect: William Douglas Lee
- Architectural style: Gothic Revival
- NRHP reference No.: 10000053
- Added to NRHP: March 8, 2010

The Garment Capitol Building is a historic building in Los Angeles. Its developer was Florence Casler. It was designed in the Gothic Revival architectural style by William Douglas Lee, and it was completed in 1926. It has been listed on the National Register of Historic Places since March 8, 2010. It was acquired by developer Naty Saidoff in 2012, who invested US$20 million to restore it.
