= William Douglas Lee =

American architect

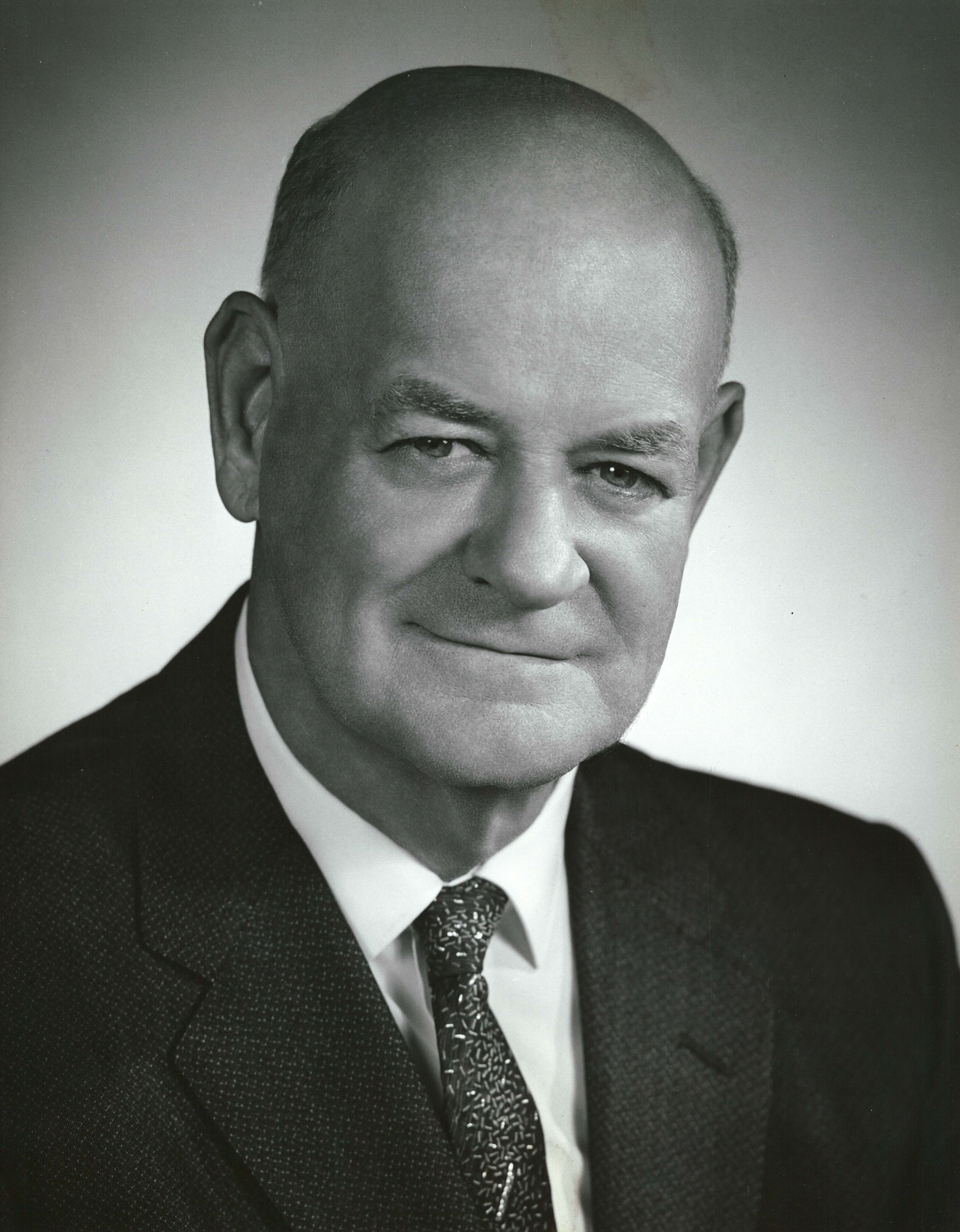
- William Douglas Lee
- Born: 1894
- Died: August 14, 1965 (aged 70–71)
- Occupation: Architect
- Spouse: Lois Lee
- Children: 2, including Douglas Everett Lee
- Buildings: Chateau Marmont; El Royale; Catalina Swimwear Building; Textile Center Building; Garment Capitol Building

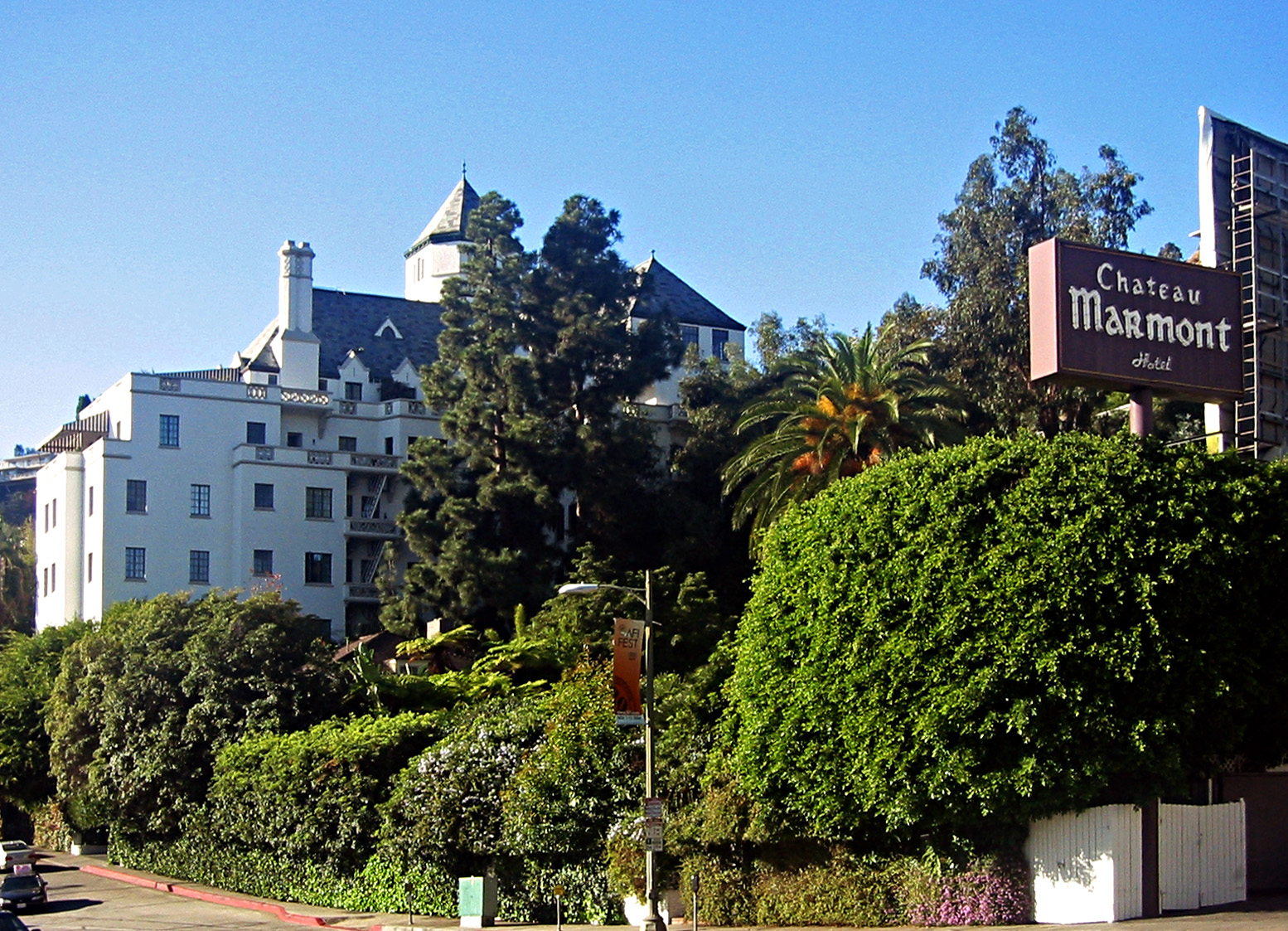
Chateau Marmont, built 1929

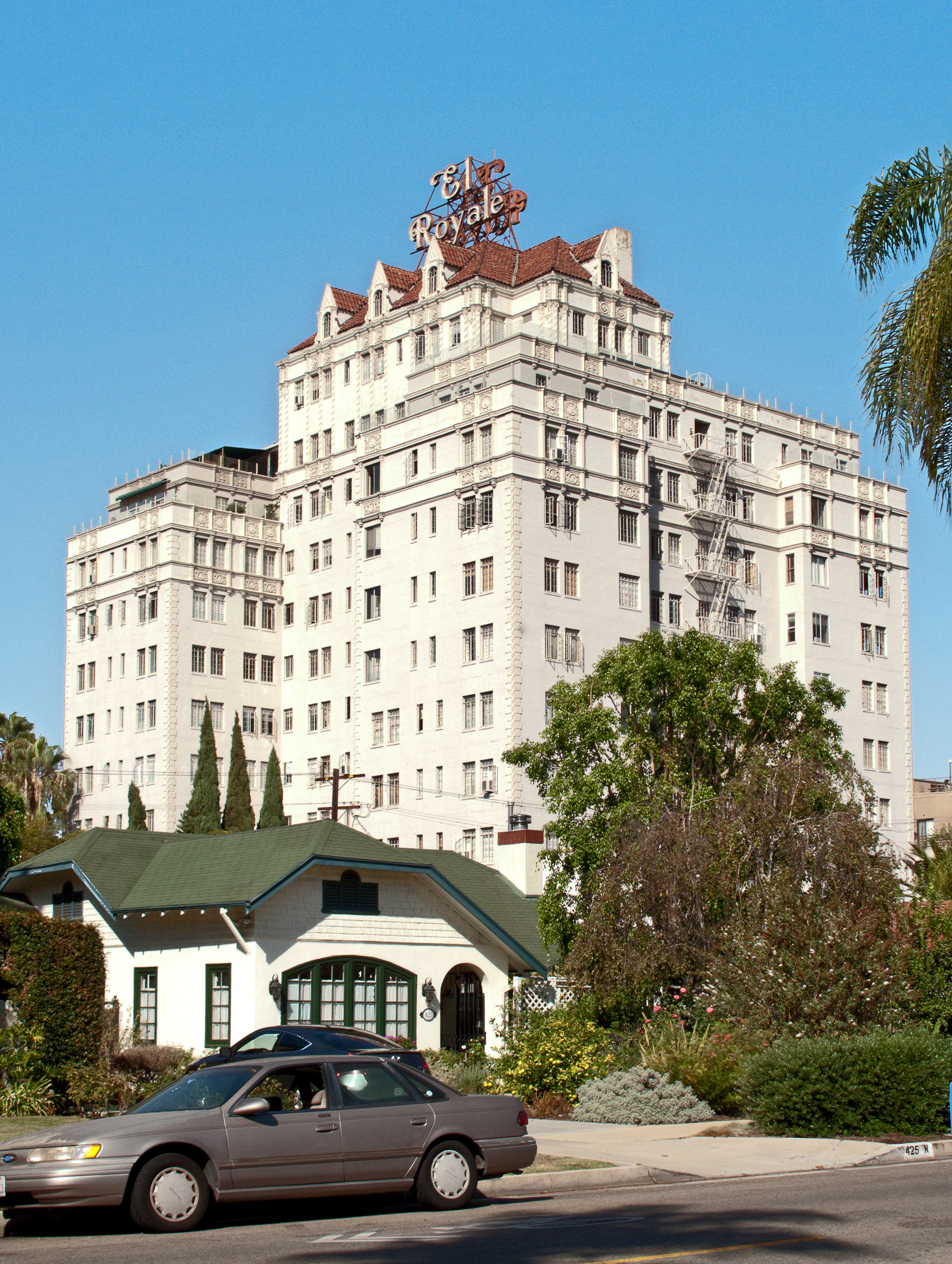
El Royale, built 1929

William Douglas Lee (1894 – August 14, 1965) was an American architect and designer in the early 20th century whose career focused on designing large Neoclassic, Gothic Revival, Renaissance Revival, and Beaux-Arts style manufacturing buildings in Downtown Los Angeles, as well as other historically notable works such as the Chateau Marmont and the El Royale apartments.

== Early work ==
William Douglas Lee's first major industrial and manufacturing facility design was The Catalina Swimwear Building (now The Catalina) located at 443 South San Pedro Street in Los Angeles. The Catalina Swimwear Building was constructed in 1923, less than two years after Lee began his independent practice, and was the headquarters for Catalina Swimwear. The building is of reinforced concrete construction, with a traditional Neoclassic façade sheathed in brick. Its construction is documented by City of Los Angeles Building Permit #38140, issued for a six-story building with a concrete frame on the southwest corner of San Pedro and Winston Streets.

Lee designed the Long Beach Professional Building, constructed in 1929.

== Partnership with Florence Casler ==
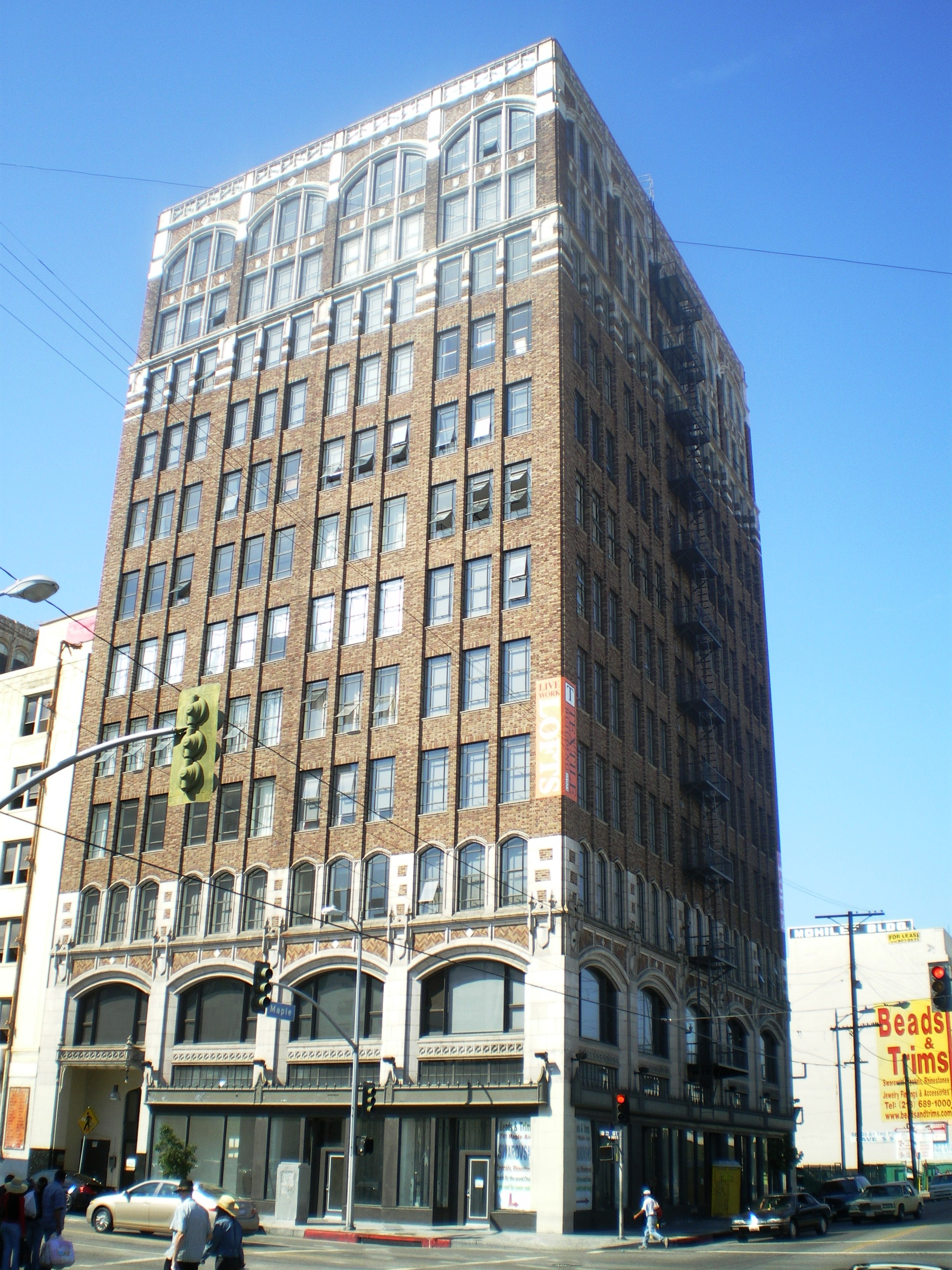
Textile Center Building, built 1926

Lee gained during the 1920s when his idea to transform the city's aesthetic with real estate developer Florence Casler took hold. Together Lee and Casler erected what she termed a "utopian commercial area" centered on Pico Boulevard and Maple Avenue. Between 1924 and 1929 they erected many major specialized industrial buildings including the Textile Center Building, the Allied Crafts Building, the Bendix Building, the Printing Center, the Graphic Arts Building, the Garment Capitol Building, the Elias-Katz Shoe Factory (now the Downtown Women's Center) the Furniture Exchange Building, and the Merchants Exchange Building.

Lee shared Casler's love of modern design enhanced with revival accenting and molding in terra cotta and stone. Even after their partnership ended, Lee designed some of the most iconic buildings in Los Angeles, including the Chateau Marmont and the El Royale apartments.

== Later work ==
William Douglas Lee and his son, Douglas Everett Lee, were responsible for the design and construction of Lee Tower located at 5455 Wilshire Boulevard, in the Miracle Mile neighborhood. "It was among the first skyscrapers built in Los Angeles after the height limit ordinance of 150 feet (46 m) was relaxed (by the Los Angeles City Council) in 1957..." Lee and his son far surpassed the limit by constructing 280 feet (85 m) up, with a total of 21 stories. Completed in 1961, the Lee Tower's steel-frame, glass-curtain wall design is very different from the period-revival designs of Lee's earlier career, and introduced the appearance of the modern skyscraper in Los Angeles.
