= Textile Center Building =

- U.S. National Register of Historic Places
- Los Angeles Historic-Cultural Monument
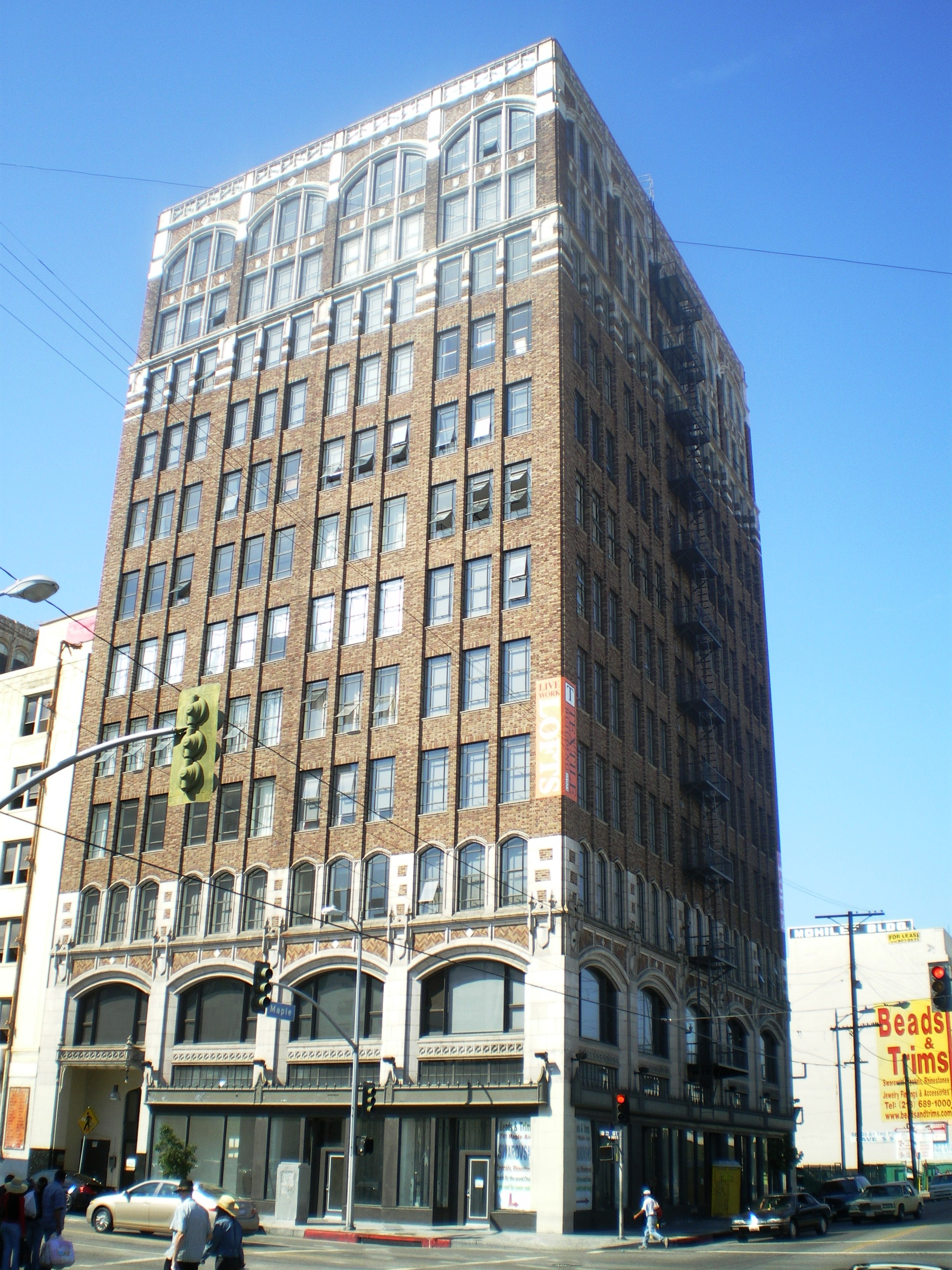
- Textile Center Building, 2008

- Location within the Los Angeles metropolitan area Location within California Location within the United States
- Location: 315 E. Eighth St., Los Angeles, California
- Coordinates: 34°2′27″N 118°15′1″W
- Built: 1926
- Architect: William Douglas Lee
- Architectural style: Late Gothic Revival, Italian Renaissance Revival
- NRHP reference No.: 05000048
- LAHCM No.: 712
- Added to NRHP: February 15, 2005

Textile Center Building is a 12-story Gothic Revival and Italian Renaissance Revival architectural styled brick building located in the Los Angeles Fashion District. Designed by William Douglas Lee in the Gothic Revival style, the building opened in 1926 as a center for garment manufacturing. It has since been converted to condominiums.

== Construction and operation ==
The Textile Center Building was developed by Florence C. Casler, a pioneering woman real estate developer and contractor. When the building was completed, Casler maintained her office there during the height of her career. In April 1926, The Los Angeles Times reported on the building's opening as follows:

"More than 6000 people were present at the formal opening of the new Textile Center Building, the new loft building on the corner of Eighth and Maple, built and owned by Lloyd & Casler, Inc., and catering exclusively to the wholesale garment manufacturers of the city."

As part of the grand opening, a fashion show was conducted featuring wearing apparel manufactured in Los Angeles. A $400,000 bond offering in May 1927 noted that the Textile Center Building had a total floor area of 88,704 square feet (8,240.9 m^{2}) and was completed in January 1926 at a cost of $626,240.68. It stated that the building was 100% rented to 56 tenants with gross annual income of $92,584 against expenses of $22,394.61, for net earnings of $70,189.39.

The building was sold in 1945 for $450,000.

== Conversion to loft-style condominiums ==
In 2005, the building was converted into loft-style condominiums. Demolition of the building's interior began in January 2005 to make way 64 condominiums and 5,000 square feet (460 m^{2}) of retail space. The project was part of MJW Investments' $130 million conversion of nine former garment buildings into live/work lofts and retail space. In 2006, the Los Angeles Business Journal reported that the building was "being filled with modern loft dwellers seeking an urban lifestyle."

== Historic designations ==
The Textile Center Building has been recognized as a historic building at both the local and national levels. In April 2002, it was designated a Historic Cultural Monument (No. 712) by the Los Angeles Cultural Heritage Commission. And in 2005 it was listed in the National Register of Historic Places.

== See also ==
- List of Registered Historic Places in Los Angeles
- Florence Casler
