= Catalina Swimwear Building =

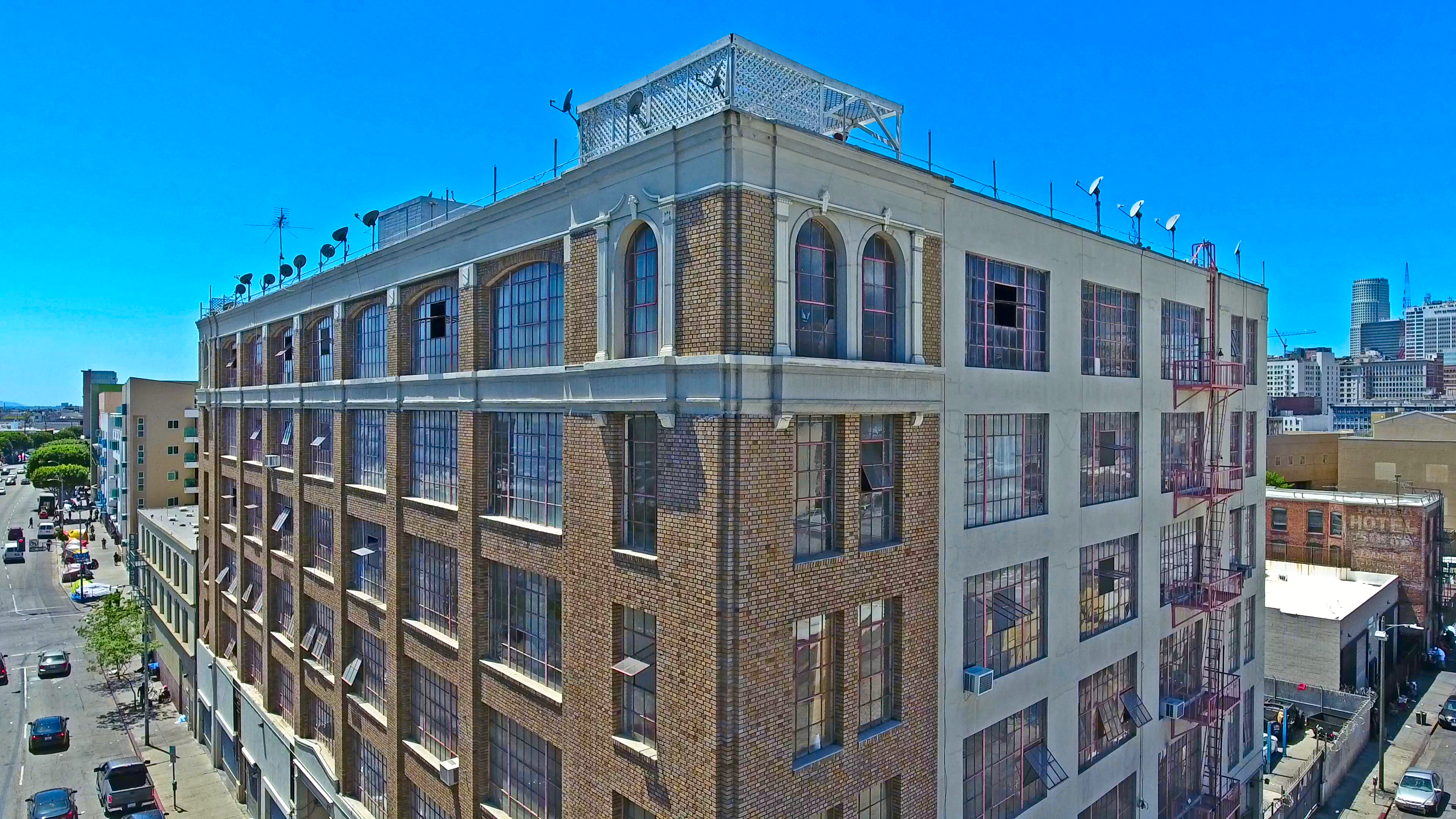
- The Catalina Swimwear Building

General information
- Architectural style: Neoclassical architecture
- Location: Downtown Los Angeles
- Address: 443 S San Pedro St
- Country: United States
- Coordinates: 34.04478°N 118.24389°W
- Completed: 1923

Technical details
- Floor count: 6
- Floor area: 92,538

Design and construction
- Architect(s): William Douglas Lee

The Catalina Swimwear Building is a six-story, industrial building located in Downtown Los Angeles. The building was designed in 1923 by architect William Douglas Lee and is Lee's first major commission as an independent architect in Los Angeles. The façade has Neoclassical features and articulation that reflect early twentieth-century architecture, more formal than typical for a building intended for manufacturing purposes. The Catalina Swimwear Building is located on the southwest corner of San Pedro and Winston Streets. The building is of reinforced concrete construction, and the upper façade is sheathed in a Flemish bond brick pattern. Its construction is documented by city of Los Angeles Building Permit #38140, issued for a six-story building with a concrete frame on the southwest corner of San Pedro and Winston Streets.

== History ==
It was the headquarters for Catalina Swimwear (one of the oldest clothing manufacturers in California) from 1923 to 1960, at which time the company moved to the city of Commerce.

== Present day ==
The Catalina Swimwear Building, now called The Catalina, was sold in 2016 and is in the process of being renovated into 78 live/work lofts to restore its historic fabric. "Work will include removing stucco from the ground floor façade to reveal original terracotta, adding a rooftop gym and possibly putting up a sign for the Catalina Swimwear Company as a way of honoring the structure’s history."
