= Hancock Park, Los Angeles =

Hancock Park
- Neighborhood of Los Angeles
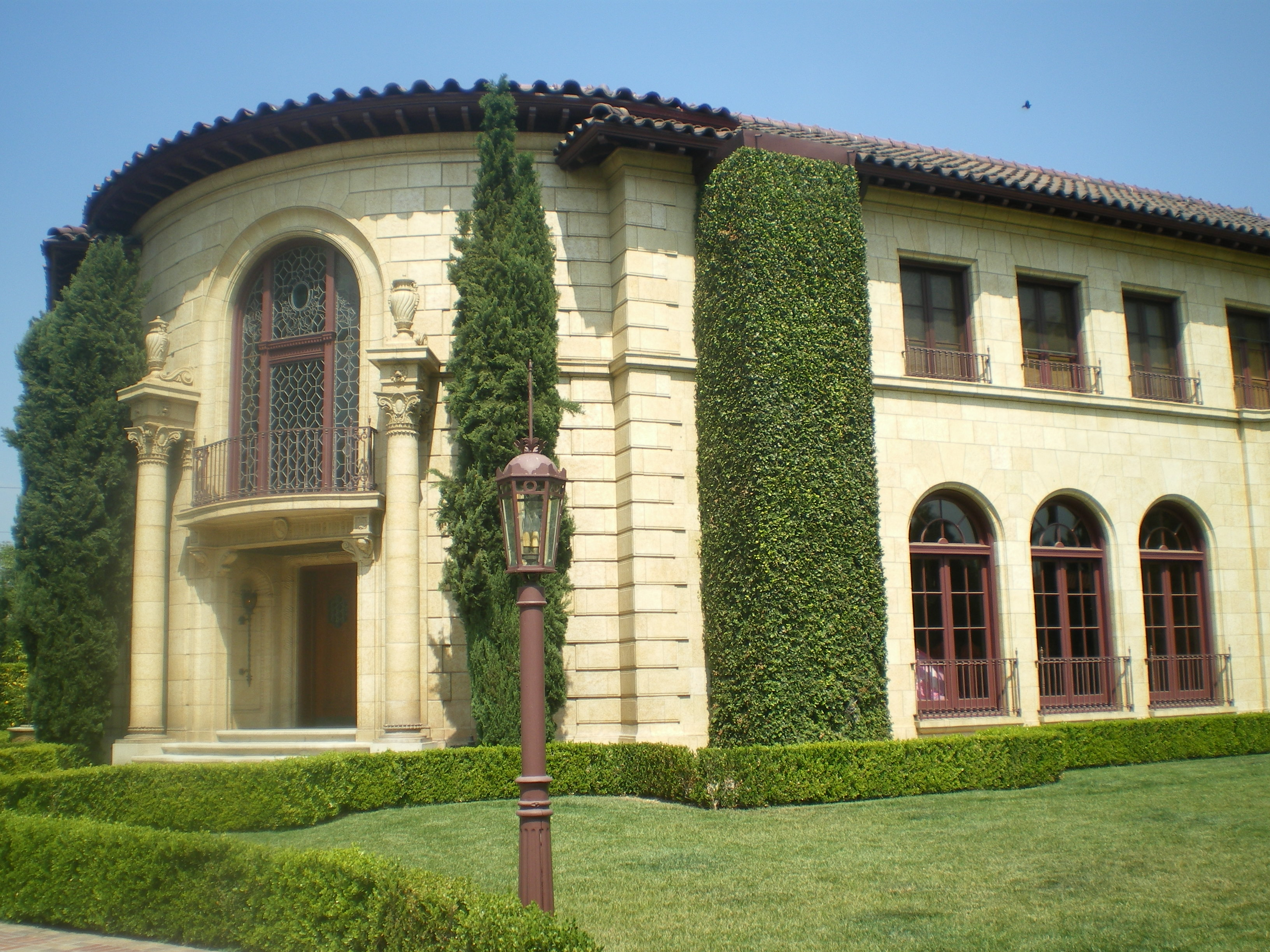
- The historic Petitfils-Boos House

- Location within Central Los Angeles
- Coordinates: 34.07619°N 118.33348°W
- Country: United States
- State: California
- County: Los Angeles
- City: Los Angeles
- Elevation: 249 ft (76 m)

Population (2024)
  - Total: 11,798
- Time zone: UTC−8 (PST)
  - Summer (DST): UTC−7 (PDT)
- ZIP Codes: 90004, 90005, 90010, 90020, 90036
- Area codes: 213, 323

Hancock Park is a residential neighborhood in the Wilshire area of Los Angeles, California. Developed in the 1920s, the neighborhood features architecturally distinctive residences, many of which were constructed in the early 20th century. Hancock Park is covered by a Historic Preservation Overlay Zone (HPOZ).

== History ==
The area owes its name to developer-philanthropist George Allan Hancock, who subdivided the property in the 1920s. The Hancock family donated the land for the park proper in 1916 in order to preserve the tar pits; at the time the "Santa Monica electric line" was the major means of access. Hancock, born and raised in a home at what is now the La Brea Tar Pits, inherited 4,400 acres (18 km^{2}), which his father, Major Henry Hancock had acquired from the Rancho La Brea property, which was owned by the family of Jose Jorge Rocha. Residential development under the "Hancock Park" name began around 1919, allegedly because "his oil derricks were running dry."

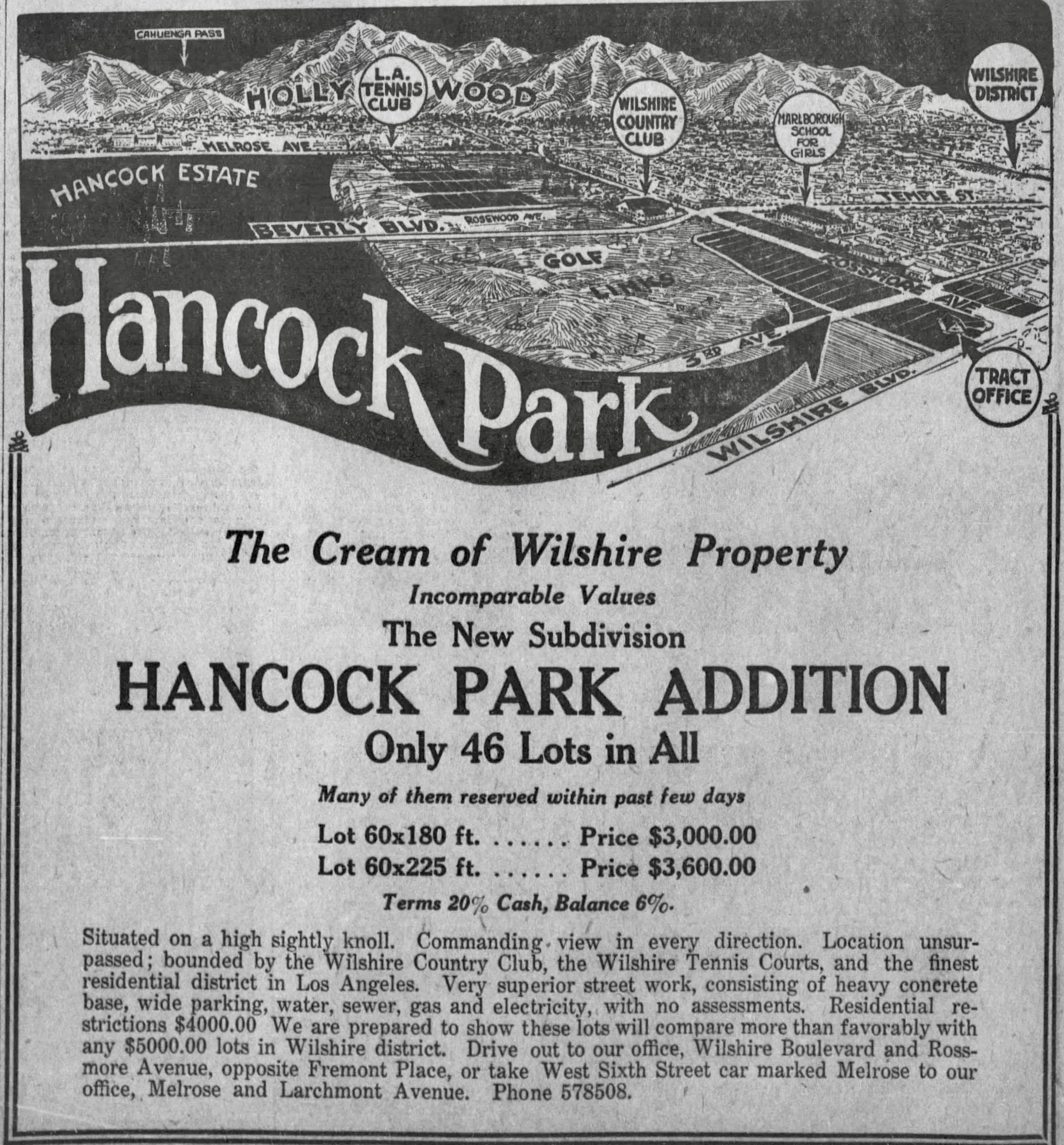
Hancock Park Addition advertisement, 1921

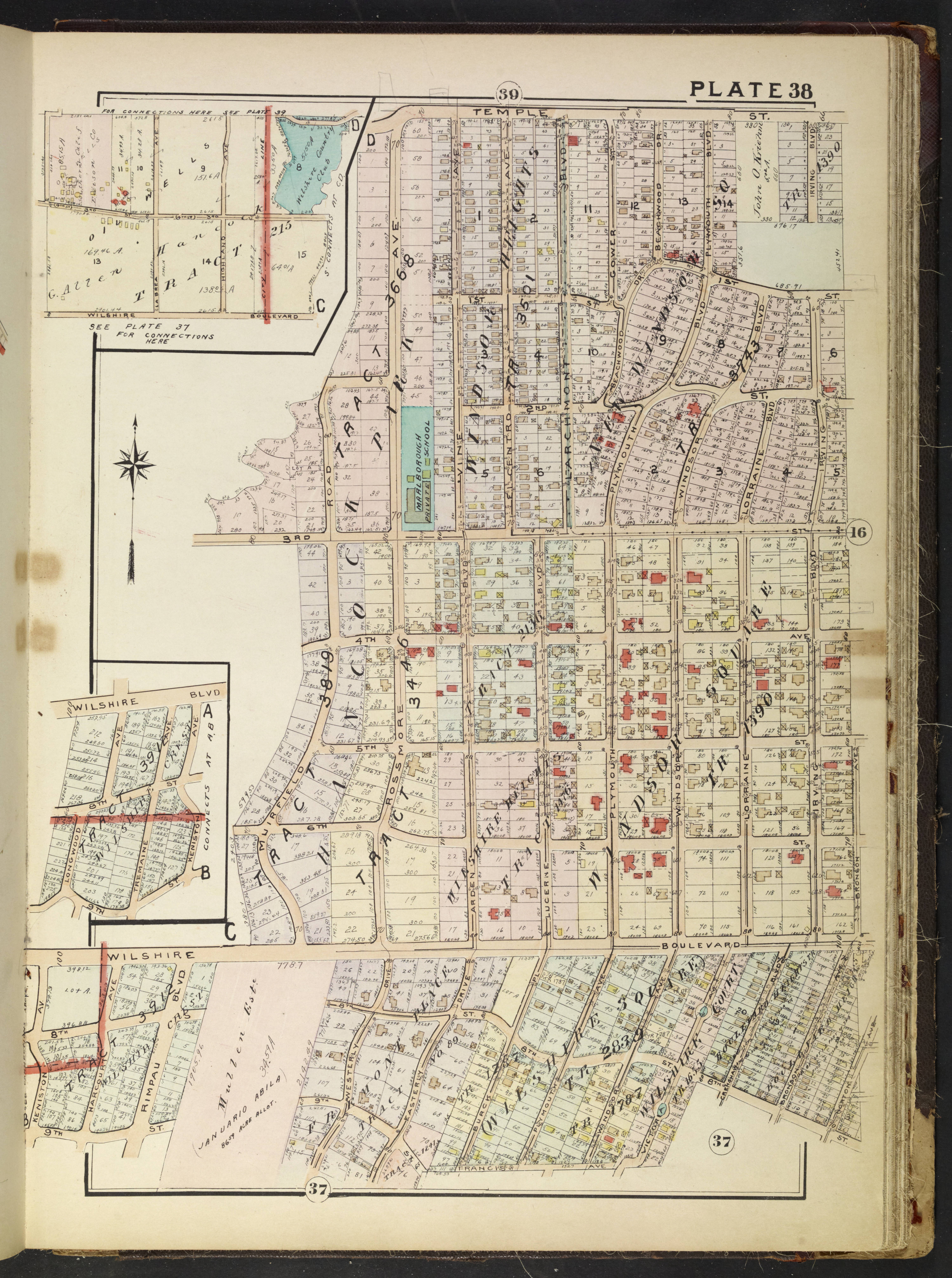
Hancock Park in Baist's Atlas, 1921

In 1948, Nat King Cole and his family purchased a $65,000 Tudor mansion in Hancock Park, becoming the first African American family to do so. This started a series of protests, where the Hancock Park Property Owners Association tried, but failed, to prevent him from buying the house. The association then tried to buy the house from him. What followed was months of abuse, in which his dog was poisoned and racial insults were burnt into his lawn. An unpublished covenant for the property stated that the home was for whites only and not for "any person whose blood is not entirely that of the Caucasian race", with the exception that "persons not of the Caucasian race" could reside in "the capacity of servants". An attorney for property owners in the area said, “We don't want undesirable people coming here." Cole replied, “Neither do I, and if I see anybody undesirable coming into this neighborhood, I'll be the first to complain.”

Residents of Hancock Park opposed development efforts in the area through the latter half of the 20th century, particularly public transit projects on Wilshire Boulevard through the neighborhood. Residents had created the Park Mile Plan, a proposal to limit any development on Wilshire in the area to two stories, which, for RTD councilmember George Takei, was about preserving "the character of Hancock Park". As a result, a proposed Metro Rail extension did not include a station in Hancock Park; this angered residents on Crenshaw Boulevard, who wanted a station at its end on Wilshire in Hancock Park. Residents of Hancock Park strongly opposed the plan on the grounds that it would lead to too much development and an increase in crime, leading to accusations of racism from those on Crenshaw Boulevard, a thoroughfare that passes through a number of majority-black neighborhoods. Those fears were present in Hancock Park resident opposition, although other factors were at play as well. In the end, the RTD chose to include a Wilshire/Crenshaw station in its proposal, making residents of Hancock Park suspicious of the entire extension. Their cause was taken up by Henry Waxman, a longtime congressman representing the area, who vehemently opposed a proposed Metro Rail extension through the area and eventually secured a ban on creating the line at all. The rail extension instead turned north to avoid the areas. Waxman came to soften his opposition to the ban by 2004, looking to commission a study to see if changing circumstances warranted construction of the line.

== Geography ==
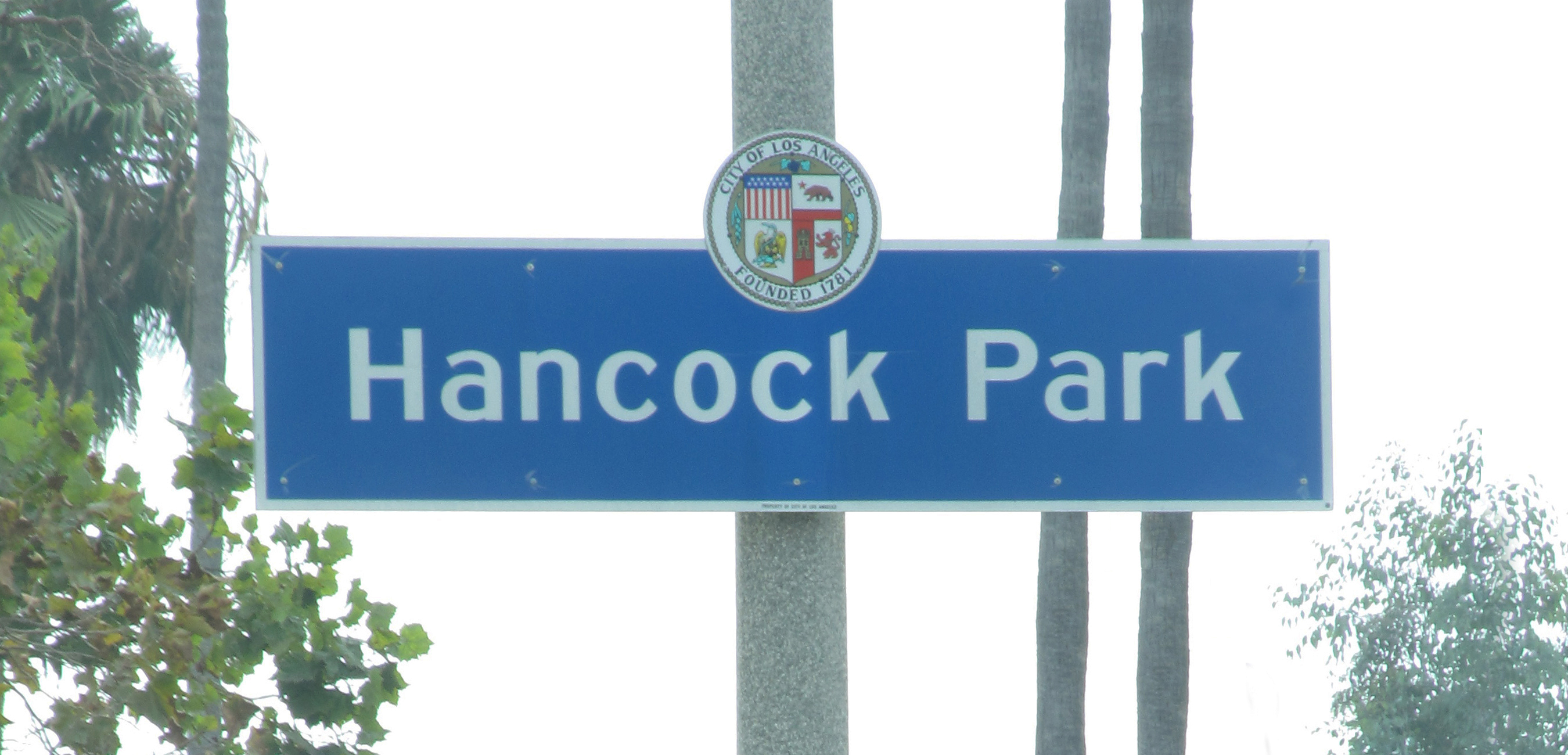
Neighborhood sign at Highland Avenue and Melrose Avenue

Hancock Park has about 1,200 homes within the boundaries of Wilshire Boulevard on the south, Melrose Avenue on the north, both sides of Highland Avenue on the west and both sides of Rossmore Avenue on the east.

In 2009, The Mapping L.A. project of the Los Angeles Times redefined the area as Wilshire Boulevard on the south, Melrose Avenue on the north, but widened the neighborhood and extended it 0.5 miles (1 km) west to La Brea Avenue, and one block east to Arden Boulevard. The Hancock Park Homeowners Association, which was established in 1948, has tried to get the Times to correct its boundaries.

Neighboring communities are Hollywood to the northeast, Melrose to the northwest, Citrus Square and La Brea–Hancock to the west, Brookside to the southwest, Fremont Place to the southeast, and Larchmont and Windsor Square to the east.

The neighborhood surrounds the grounds of the Wilshire Country Club.

== Historic Preservation Overlay Zone ==
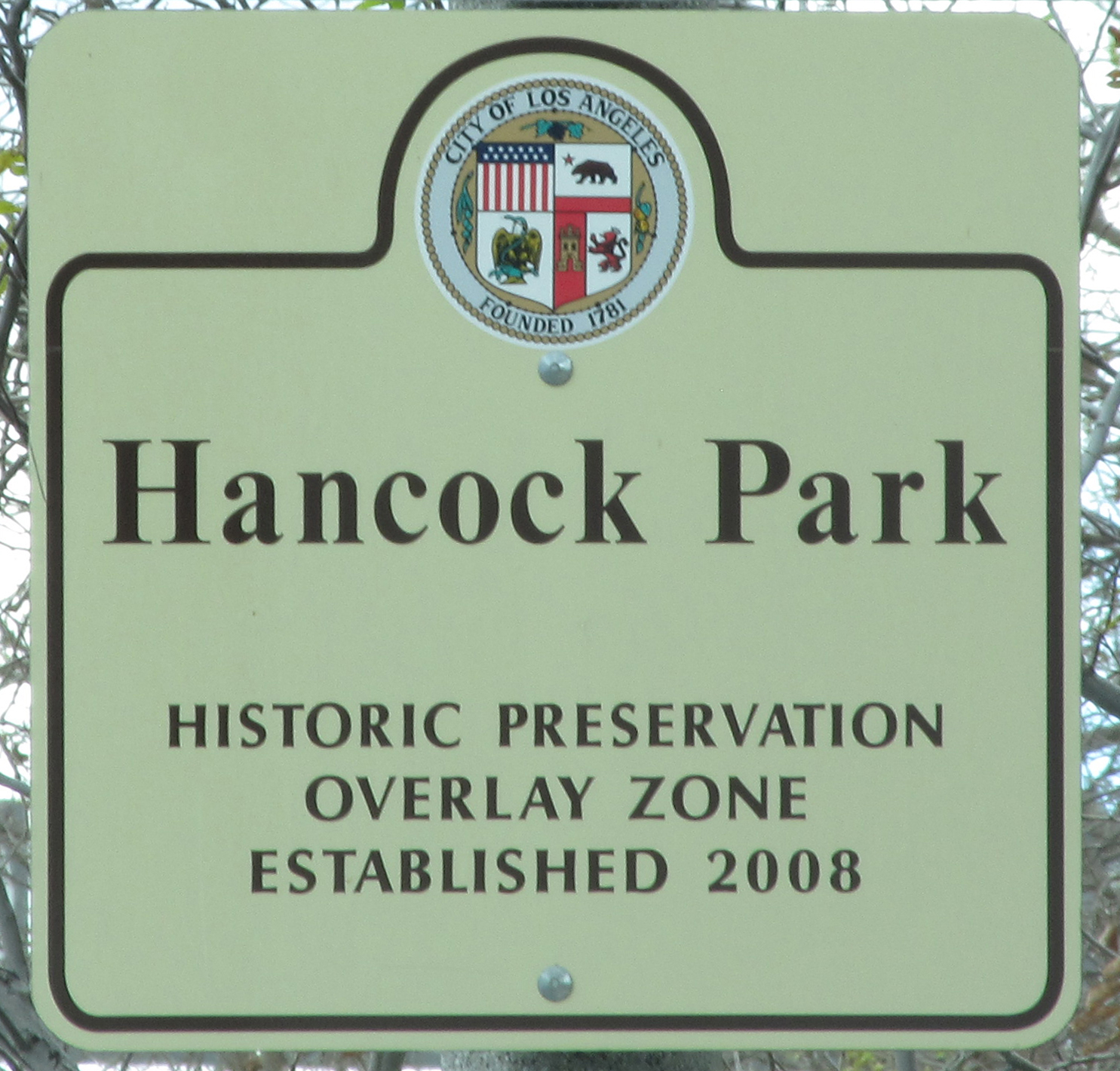
HPOZ signage at Rossmore and Melrose Avenues

The Hancock Park HPOZ was adopted by the City Council in 2008. The area is "generally bounded by Melrose Avenue on the north, Highland Avenue on the west, Rossmore Avenue on the east, and the rear property lines of the commercial properties along Wilshire Boulevard on the south". HPOZ signage is posted in the neighborhood.

It is largely within the Wilshire Community Plan area, though a small portion in the northwest (north of Rosewood Avenue and west of June Street) is in the Hollywood Community Plan area.

== Demographics ==
The following data applies to the boundaries set by Mapping L.A.:

=== 2000 ===
The 2000 U.S. census counted 9,804 residents in the 1.59-square-mile (4.1 km^{2}) neighborhood—an average of 6,459 people per 1-square-mile (2.6 km^{2}), including the expanse of the Wilshire Country Club. That figure gave Hancock Park one of the lowest densities in Los Angeles. In 2008, the city estimated that the population had increased to 10,671. The median age for residents was 37, considered old when compared with the city as a whole; the percentages of residents aged 35 and above were among the county's highest.

Hancock Park was moderately diverse ethnically. The population was 70.7% non-Hispanic White, 13.1% Asian, 8.5% Hispanic or Latino, 3.8% Black, and 3.9% were of other or mixed race. Korea and the Philippines were the most common places of birth for the 26.3% of the residents who were born abroad, a figure that was considered low compared to rest of the city.

=== 2008 ===
The median yearly household income in 2008 dollars was $85,277, a relatively high figure for Los Angeles, and a high percentage of households earned $125,000 or more. The average household size of 2.1 people was low for the city of Los Angeles. Renters occupied 52.7% of the housing units, and house or apartment owners 47.3%.

The percentages of never-married men and women, 41.3% and 34.4%, respectively, were among the county's highest. The 2000 census found 203 families headed by single parents, a low rate for both the city and the county. The percentage of military veterans who served during World War II or Korea was among the county's highest.

Hancock Park residents were considered highly educated, 56.2% of those aged 25 and older having earned a four-year degree. The percentage of residents with a master's degree was high for the county.

=== Orthodox Jews ===
Hancock Park contains a community of Orthodox Jews. According to Teresa Watanabe of the Los Angeles Times, there are no clear figures, but in the early 21st century, The Jewish Journal of Greater Los Angeles estimated that Orthodox Jews made up 20% of the neighborhood's total population. Hancock Park is home to nearly all subsections of Orthodox Judaism; of particular note is the large population of Chasidic Jews. The Chasidic Jewish population is growing at an above-average rate due to high birth rates within the community. Orthodox Jews are required to be within walking distance to their synagogues, and Hancock Park is within walking distance to the La Brea Avenue–area synagogues. Teresa Watanabe stated some Orthodox families cited the large size of houses as a reason for moving there, others cited a better housing value compared to Beverly Hills, and others cited a proximity to the Yavneh Hebrew Academy. As of 2007, there were six Jews on the 16-member board of directors of the Hancock Park Homeowners Association. As of 2007, the number of Orthodox Jews in Hancock Park is increasing. As of that year, there had been disputes between Orthodox Jews and their neighbors.

== Historic cultural monuments ==
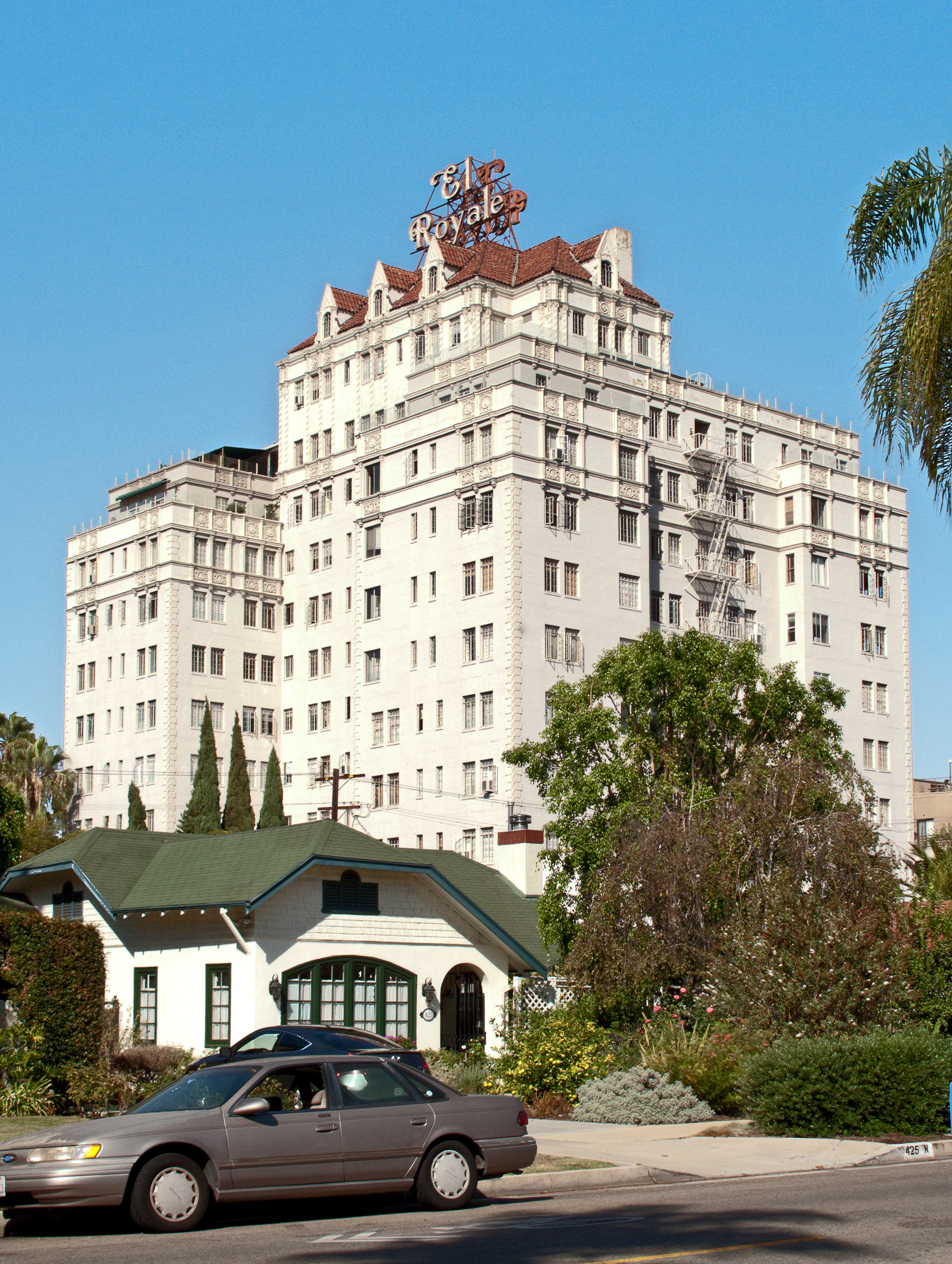
El Royale Apts. in Hancock Park

The following Historic-Cultural Monuments are located in Hancock Park:

- Queen and Washingtonia Robusta Palm Trees and Median Strip - Palm trees planted in 1928. Historic Cultural Monument 94, designated January 26, 1972.
- La Casa de las Campanas - 350–354 N. June Street. Historic Cultural Monument 239, designated April 9, 1981.
- The El Royale - An apartment building built in 1929. Historic Cultural Monument 309, designated September 2, 1986.
- Wolff-Fifield House - 111 N. June Street. Historic Cultural Monument 619, designated June 21, 1996.
- The Ravenswood - An apartment building built in 1930. Historic Cultural Monument 768, designated November 7, 2003.

== Education ==
John Burroughs Middle School

LAUSD operates the public schools within the Hancock Park borders.

- Third Street Elementary School, 201 South June Street
- John Burroughs Middle School, 600 South McCadden Place
- Marlborough School, private school for young women established in 1889, 250 South Rossmore Avenue

== Consuls general ==
- The Consulate General of Belize is located at 4801 Wilshire Blvd, Suite 250.

Additionally, many residences of consuls general are within Hancock Park.

- Official Residence of the Consul General of Argentina - 403 S. Plymouth Boulevard.
- Official Residence of the British Consul General - 450 S. June Street. Since 1957, the residence of the British Consul General in Los Angeles has been in a home designed by the renowned architect Wallace Neff and completed in 1928. Prince William, Duke of Cambridge, and Catherine, Duchess of Cambridge, stayed there in July 2011 on their first visit to the United States after their wedding.
- Official Residence of the Consul General of Canada - 165 S Muirfield Road.
- Official Residence of the Consul General of Japan - Hudson Avenue. On May 21, 2019, the Government of Japan presented Dr. Henry H. Takei the Order of the Rising Sun at the Hancock Park home of the Consul General.

== In popular culture ==
- 172 S. McCadden Place - the home of "Baby Jane" Hudson in Whatever Happened to Baby Jane. According to Variety, "its appearance in What Ever Happened to Baby Jane? has secured its place in the annals of Hollywood history".

== Notable people ==
- Muhammad Ali, boxer
- Mara Brock Akil & Salim Akil, producers
- Antonio Banderas, actor
- Stacey Bendet, fashion designer
- Nat King Cole, singer and first black resident
- Natalie Cole, singer
- Jan Crull Jr., attorney
- Alexandra Daddario, actress
- Eric Eisner, producer
- Bruce Feirstein, writer
- Melanie Griffith, actress
- Jake Gyllenhaal, actor
- Maggie Gyllenhaal, actress
- Sean Hayes, actor
- Leonard Hill, television executive and real estate developer
- Howard Hughes, businessman and film producer
- Mindy Kaling, actress
- Dan Lauria, actor
- Meghan Markle, actress and wife of Prince Harry, Duke of Sussex
- Joey McIntyre, singer and actor
- Dermot Mulroney, actor
- Mike Murphy, political consultant
- Walter O'Malley, baseball executive and owner of the Brooklyn/Los Angeles Dodgers
- Ozzy Osbourne, singer
- Lou Rawls, singer
- Shonda Rhimes, producer and screenwriter
- Brian Robbins, Actor, Director, Producer, and Writer
- Ted Sarandos, CEO of Netflix
- Fred Savage, actor
- Tavis Smiley, talk show host
- Lewis Stone, actor
- Catherine Stubblefield Wilson, convicted child pornographer

== See also ==
- List of districts and neighborhoods in Los Angeles
- Salt Lake Oil Field

== Sources ==
- Gilman, Jane (March 13, 2020). Inside Hancock Park. Pedernales Publishing. ISBN 978-0-578-66427-9. LCCN 2020905049.
