= El Royale =

Apartment building, Los Angeles Historic-Cultural Monument

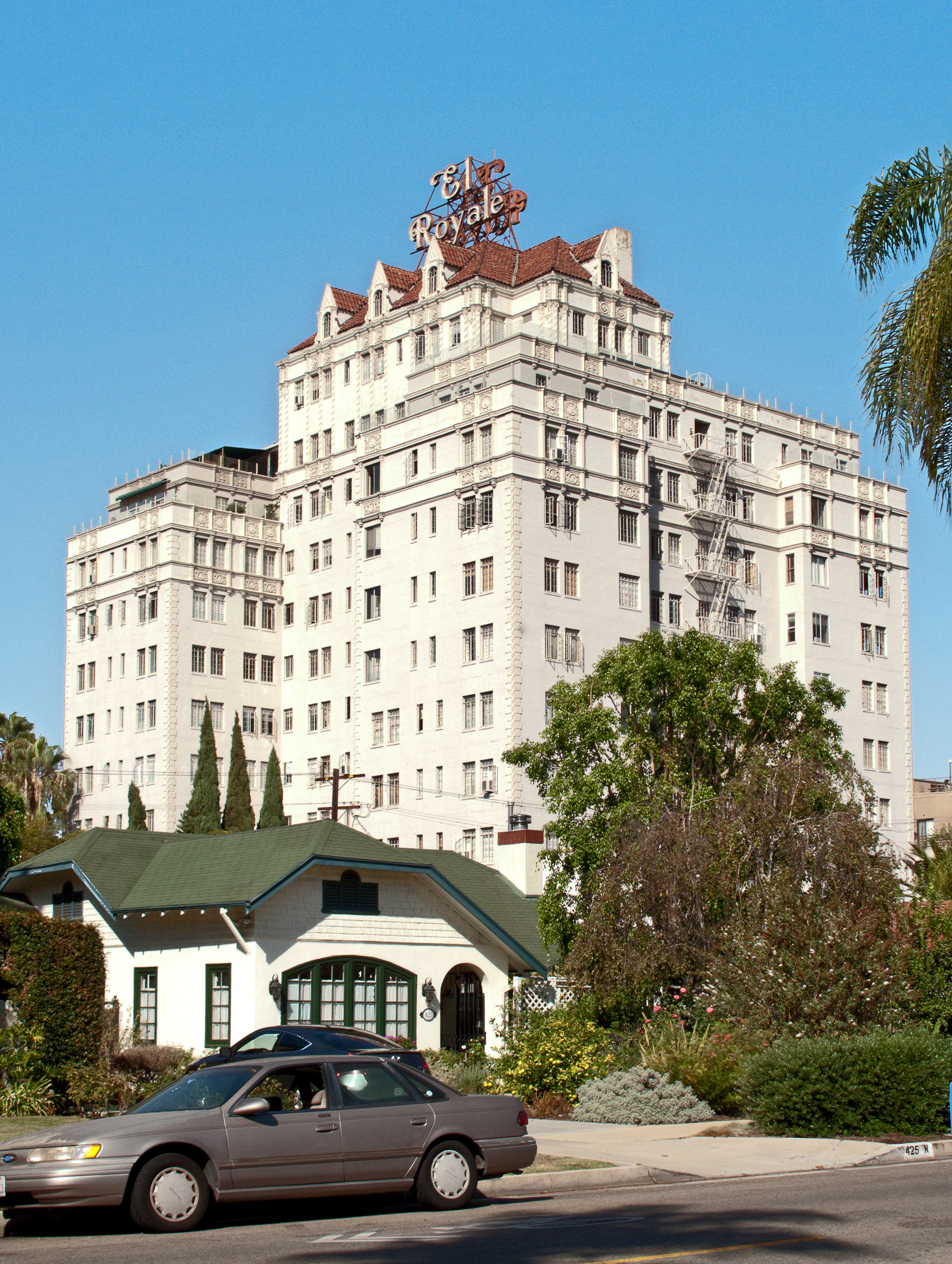
- Interactive map of El Royale
- Location: 450 North Rossmore Avenue, Los Angeles, California, U.S.
- Coordinates: 34.07856°N 118.326874°W
- Built: 1929
- Architect: William Douglas Lee
- Architectural style: Spanish Renaissance Revival
- Website: elroyaleapartments.com

Los Angeles Historic-Cultural Monument
- Official name: El Royale Apartments
- Designated: September 2, 1986
- Reference no.: 309

The El Royale is a historic apartment complex located at the intersection of Rosewood Avenue and Rossmore Avenue in the Hancock Park neighborhood of Los Angeles. It was designed by famed architect William Douglas Lee and completed in 1929.

The apartment building is known as a home for celebrities, and for its iconic green neon rooftop sign, which had been unlit for 50 years.

== History ==
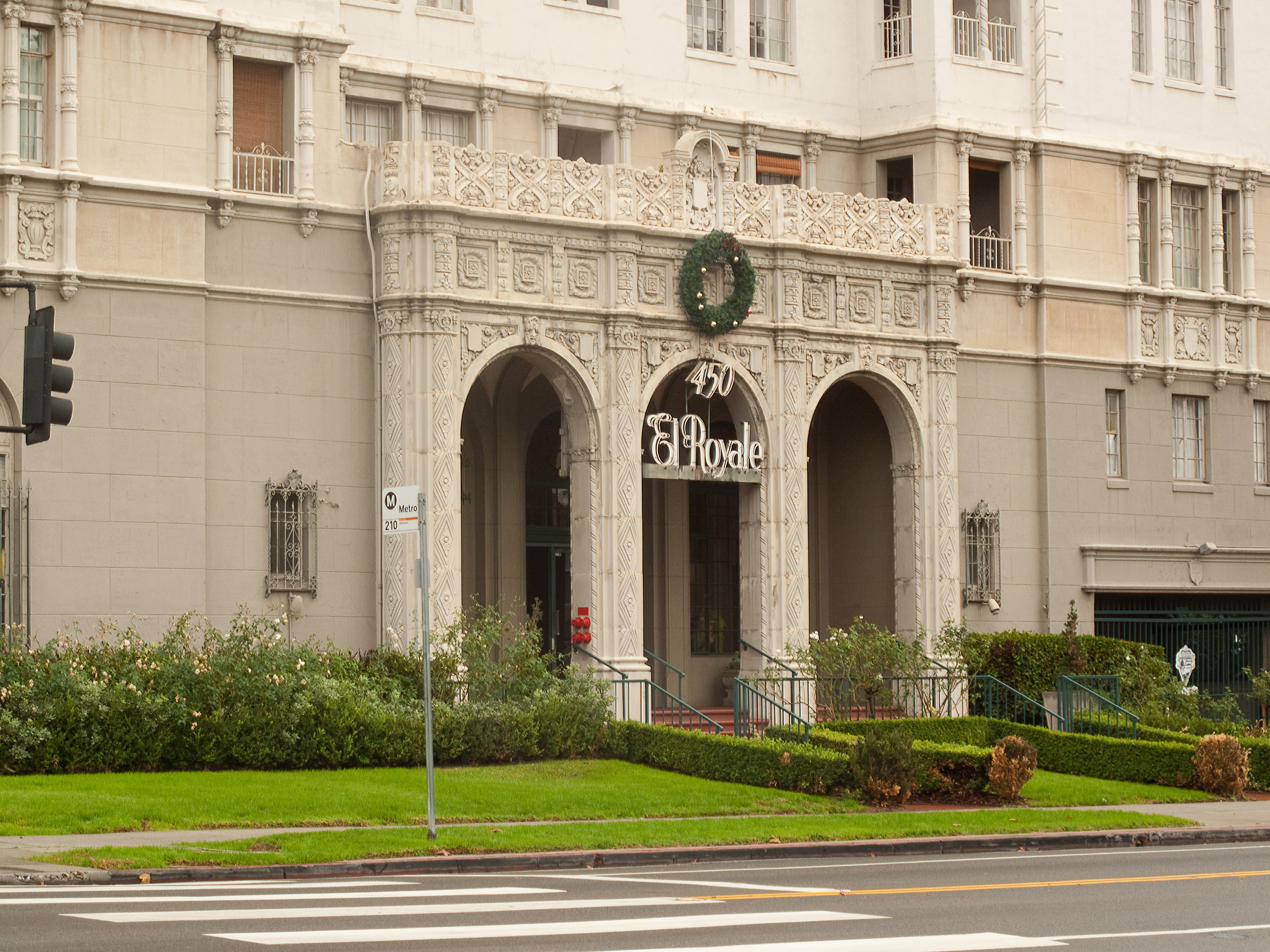
Entrance to the El Royale

The El Royale was constructed in 1929, underwritten by the Barco Investment Company. William Douglas Lee, architect of the famed Chateau Marmont, was conscripted for the design. It was created as a fusion of Spanish Colonial Revival, French Rococo, and Renaissance styles and featured modern state-of-the-art amenities such as an elevator, neon sign, and putting green. It also showcased luxuries including marble floors, elaborate chandeliers, panoramic penthouse views, and hand-carved wood.

In 1952, the apartments purchased the Union Oil Building at S Hope Street and 7th Street in Downtown Los Angeles as an investment for $2.2 million (equivalent to $26.7 million in 2025). In November 2012, the El Royale was purchased by Kamran Hakim and Farhad Eshaghpour for $29.5 million in cash.

== Legacy ==
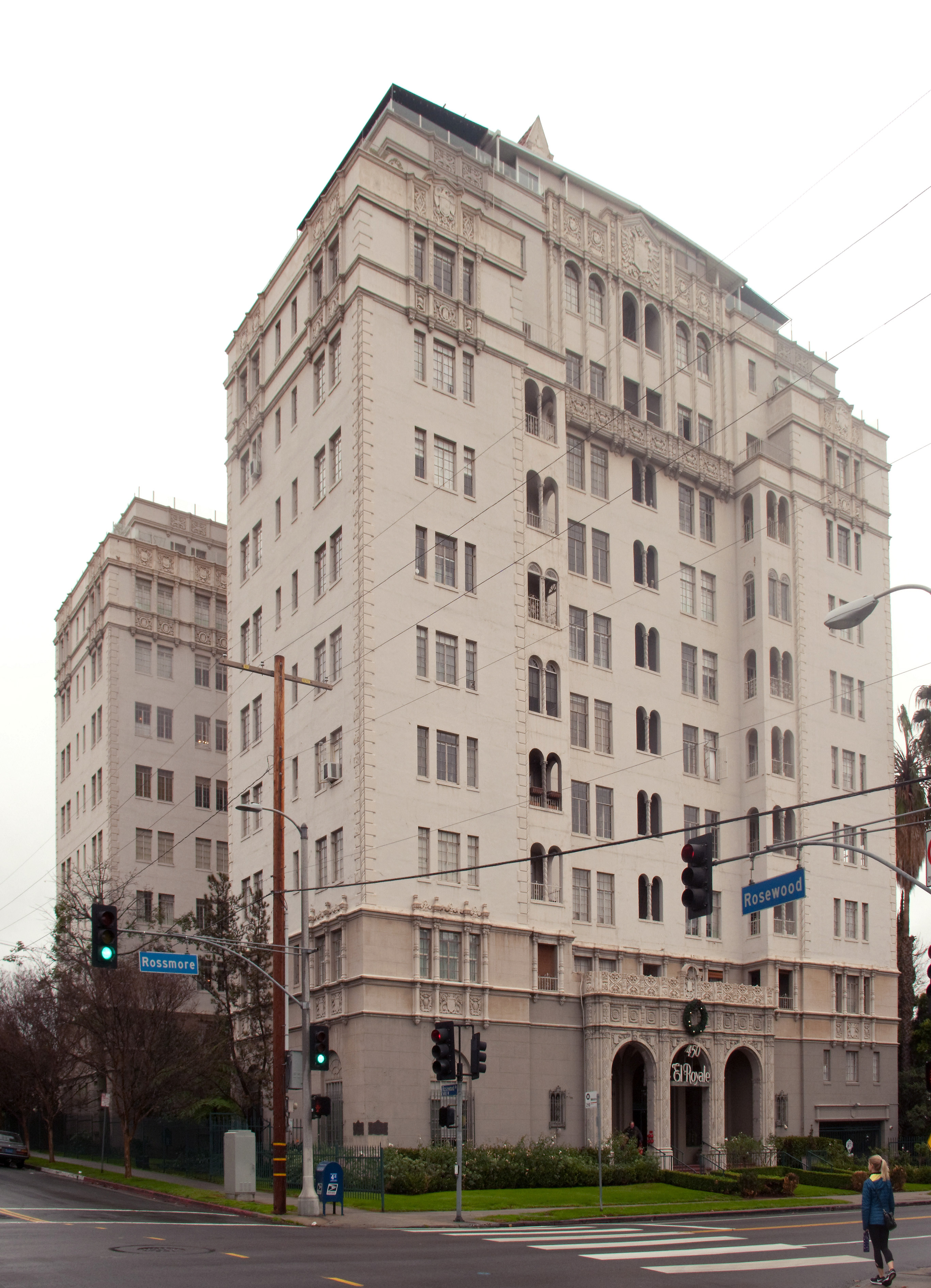
Façade of the El Royale

The El Royale has been known as a home for celebrities over the years, including Nicolas Cage, Huell Howser, Al Jolson, and George Raft.

Scenes for Double Indemnity (1944) were filmed in the building's garage. The front facade of the building has been used in scenes for the TV series All of Us and Girlfriends, implying that one of the fictional characters from each show lived at the apartments. The El Royale, however, is not the setting of the 2018 movie Bad Times at the El Royale.
