= Florence Casler =

Canadian businessman

- Photograph from Los Angeles Times, 1931
- Born: May 30, 1869; Canada
- Died: March 15, 1954 (aged 84); Yolo, California
- Occupation: Architect
- Buildings: Textile Center Building

Florence Casler (May 30, 1869 – March 15, 1954) was a Canadian-American real estate developer, contractor, and partner in the firm Lloyd & Casler, Inc.

A native of Canada, Casler married a plumber who opened a plumbing business in Buffalo, New York. Her husband left her behind with two daughters to make his fortune in gold mining. He returned eight years later with only $700, but during those years, Casler had obtained her license as a plumber expert and built a business employing twelve men. In 1921, after her husband died, Casler moved with her daughters to Los Angeles, where she went into business as a builder and developer. In 1931, she recalled, "I put up flat buildings right after the war when no one was risking building anything. I have sixty of them now. Then I had the idea of developing Maple Avenue. My Class A buildings are on Maple -- one for garment manufacturers, one for printing, one for furniture, and they are all full."

Though she joined the real estate development company, Lloyd and Casler, Inc., in 1923, she later went out on her own, preferring to make all decisions herself without partners. Among the buildings she developed is the Textile Center Building, which is listed on the National Register of Historic Places. Upon the opening of the Textile Center Building in 1926, the Los Angeles Times noted that the building was "the outgrowth of an idea born of one of the builders -- Mrs. Frances C. Casler -- who, though only a resident of Los Angeles for ten years, is responsible for the construction of over $7,000,000 worth of property ..." Casler maintained her office at the Textile Center Building during the height of her career.

Other buildings developed by Casler include the Allied Crafts Building, the Mac Printing Co. Building, the Bendix Building and the Garment Capitol Building. By 1931, the Los Angeles Times reported that Casler had "eight Class A limit-height buildings to her credit, sixty flat buildings and a vast vision of the future of Los Angeles." The group Preserve LA has described Casler as "perhaps the only woman involved in heavy construction in Los Angeles at the time."

The Los Angeles Times cautioned the city's businessmen in 1931 not to underestimate "this nice maternal little woman, in a soft green suit, a black and white hat with a feminine white rose beneath its brim." It also noted: "She seems to be pleasantly unaware what a remarkable little woman she is. She went right along with her plumbing while the babies were coming along and she marvels that there could ever be any discussion as to whether women should try to combine both careers and matrimony. 'I had to,' she laughs, 'so I never thought about it.'" In 2008, the Los Angeles Cultural Heritage Commission recognized Casler as "one of the first women in the early 20th century to head a company in the field of development and construction of high-rise buildings." She was also appointed as the head of Peoples Bank of Los Angeles, making her the only female director of a bank in Los Angeles.

== See also ==
- Textile Center Building
